= Basilica of Notre-Dame des Enfants =

Basilica in Châteauneuf-sur-Cher, Cher, France

Our Lady of the Children Notre-Dame des Enfants
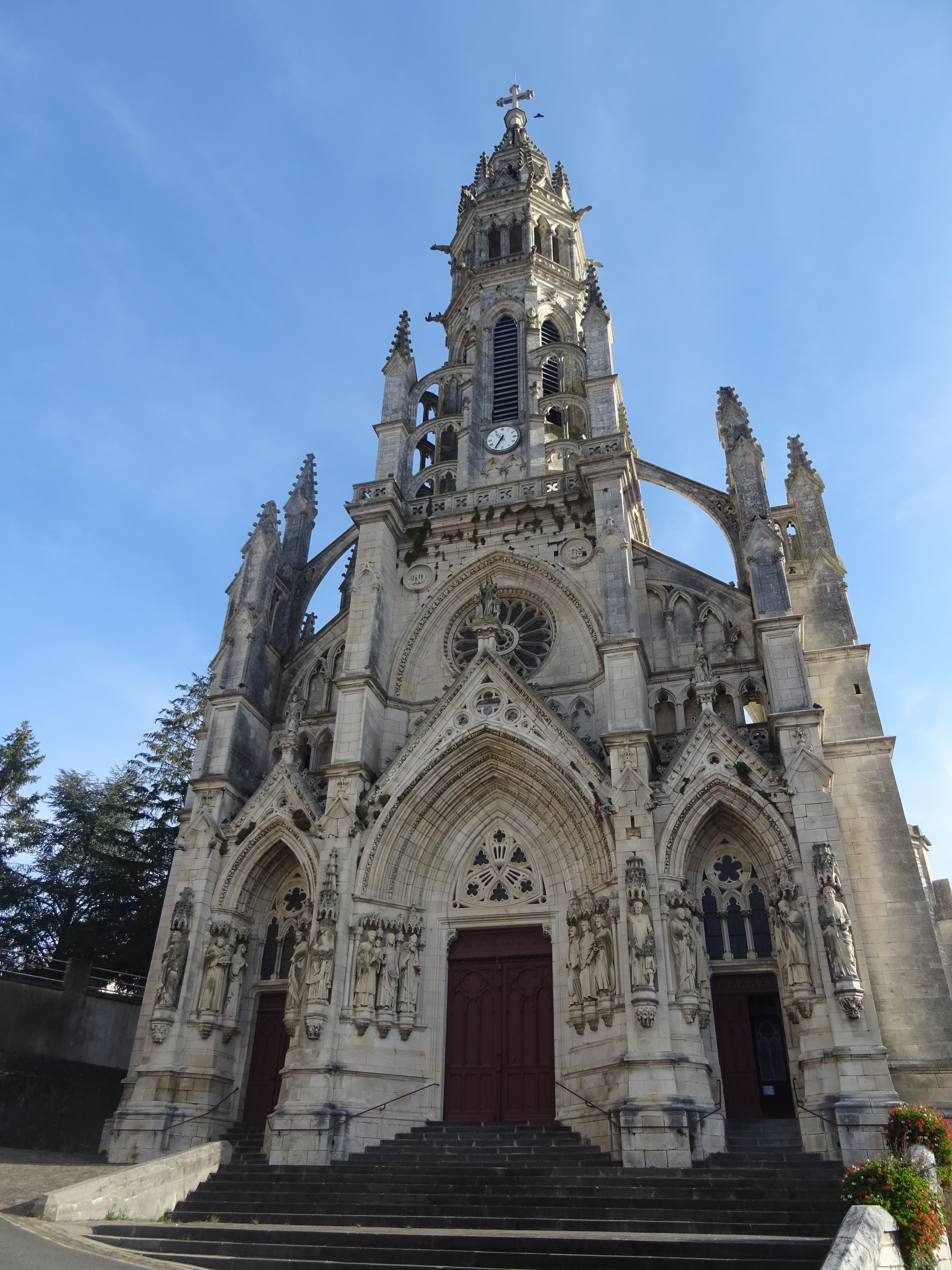
- Façade of Basilica of Our lady of the Children

Religion
- Affiliation: Roman Catholic Church
- Province: Archdiocese of Bourges
- Region: Centre-Val de Loire
- Rite: Roman
- Ecclesiastical or organisational status: Basilica
- Status: Active

Location
- Location: Châteauneuf-sur-Cher, France
- Interactive map of Our Lady of the Children; Notre-Dame des Enfants
- Coordinates: 46°51′31″N 2°19′21″E

Architecture
- Type: Church
- Style: Neo Gothic
- Groundbreaking: 1869
- Completed: 1879

Website
- https://nd-enfants.org/

Basilica of Notre-Dame des Enfants (French: Basilique Notre-Dame des Enfants) is a minor basilica located in Châteauneuf-sur-Cher, France. The basilica is dedicated to Our Lady of the Children and is the seat of the Archbishop of Bourges. Built from 1869 until 1879, it is largely in the Neo-Gothic architectural style and was constructed at about the same time as Basilica of Notre-Dame de Fourvière.

== History ==
It was built between 1869 and 1879 in grand Gothic style to replace the ruined 16th-century church. Father Ducros, the newly appointed Dean of Châteauneuf-sur-Cher, wrote to all the parishes asking the children for donations towards the building. The story goes that one little girl living in Semur-en-Brionnais wrote asking that the new church be named Our Lady of the Children. It is the only church in France to be called this.

In 1861, Father Jacques-Marie Ducros, priest of the Roman Catholic Archdiocese of Bourges, new parish priest, discovered a parish church in very poor condition. Eager to rebuild the building, the idea came to him to appeal to the generosity of children throughout France. To his surprise, a young girl sent him her offering and her congratulations for having wanted the new shrine to be dedicated to Our Lady of the Children. The Blessed Virgin, invoked under this title, will take pleasure in filling childhood with the most abundant graces. The project was reoriented and donations flowed. The new church project would not have survived without the active collaboration of Brother Hariolf (Pierre Fayolle), director of the free school for boys of Châteauneuf-sur-Cher, of the congregation of de La Salle Brothers, passionate for architecture and construction. He supervised the construction works and brought this site to completion.

== Exterior ==
It is built on top of the hill and is an amazing structure of flying buttresses, pinnacles, spires, carvings, statues and gargoyles. It is built from the local tufa stone. The nave is very tall, with lower roofs on the chancel and ambulatory. The entry is up steps to the west door, which has statues on it such as bishops, saints, martyrs like Vincent de Paul, Jean-Baptiste de La Salle, Anthony of Padua, James the Great, Aloysius Gonzaga, Germaine Cousin, Saint Osmund, Saint Lawrence, Louis IX of France, John Berchmans, Thérèse d'Avila, Stanislas Kostka and Saint Blaise.

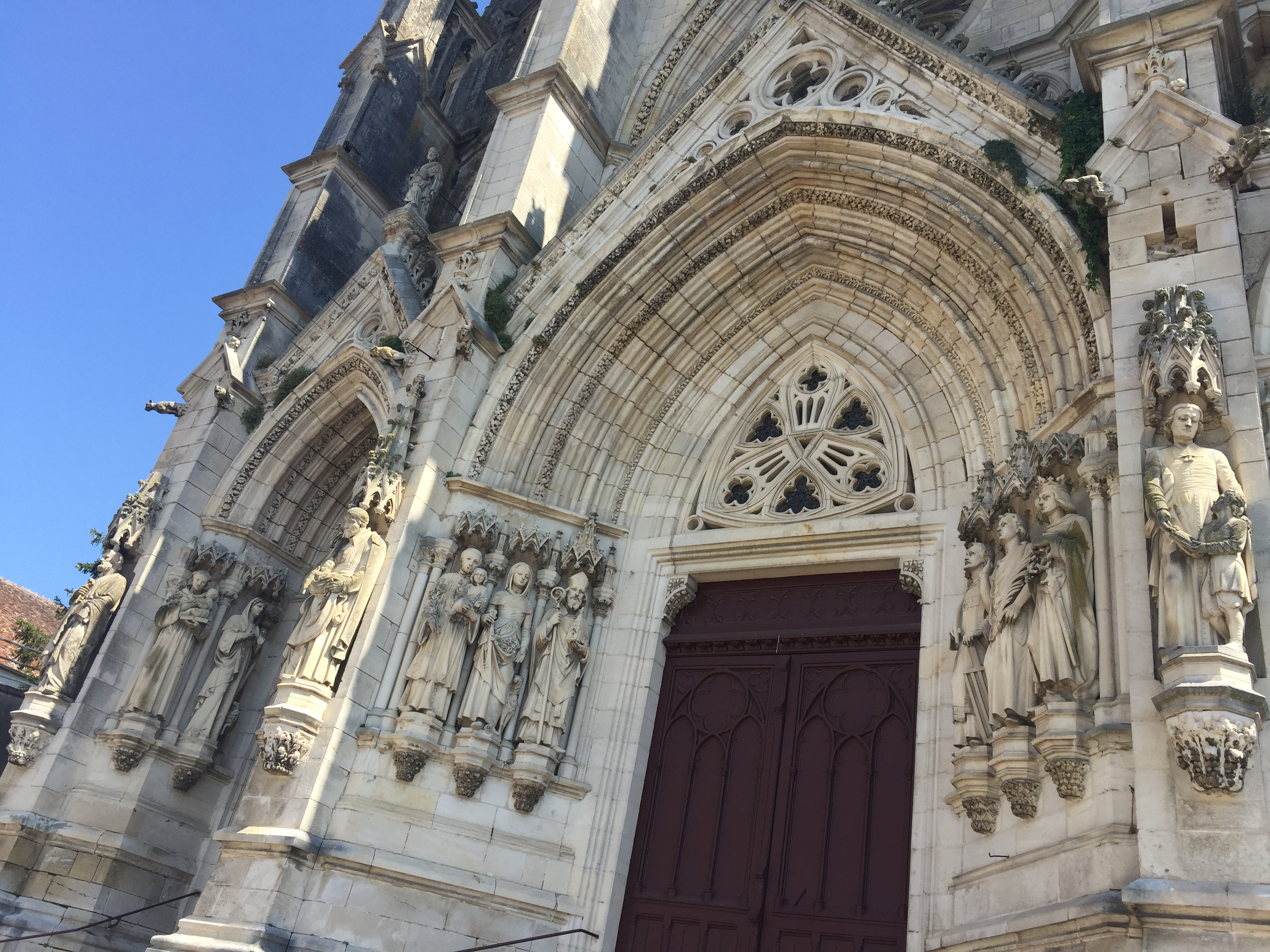
The portal

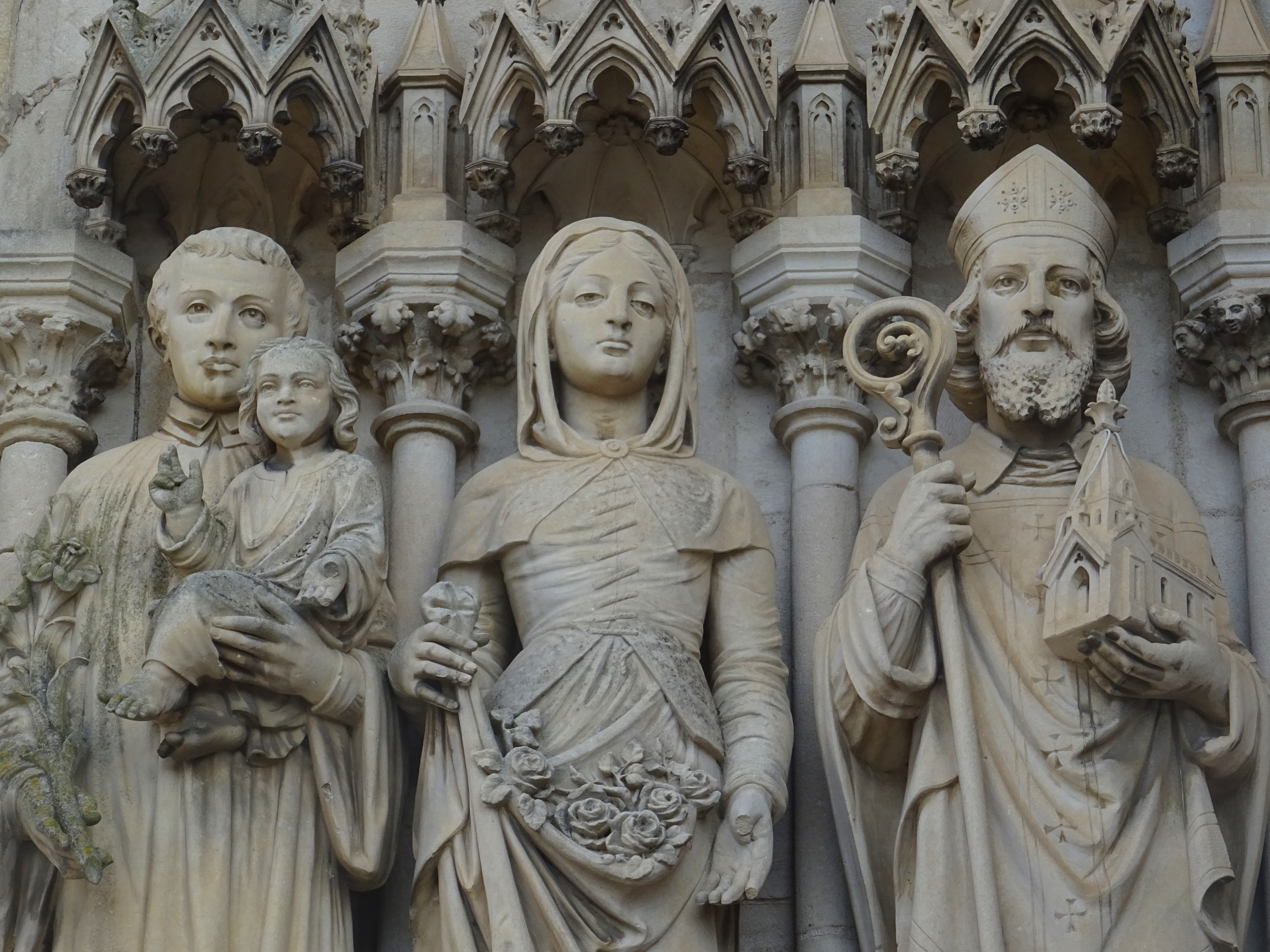
Aloysius Gonzaga, Germaine Cousin, Saint Osmund

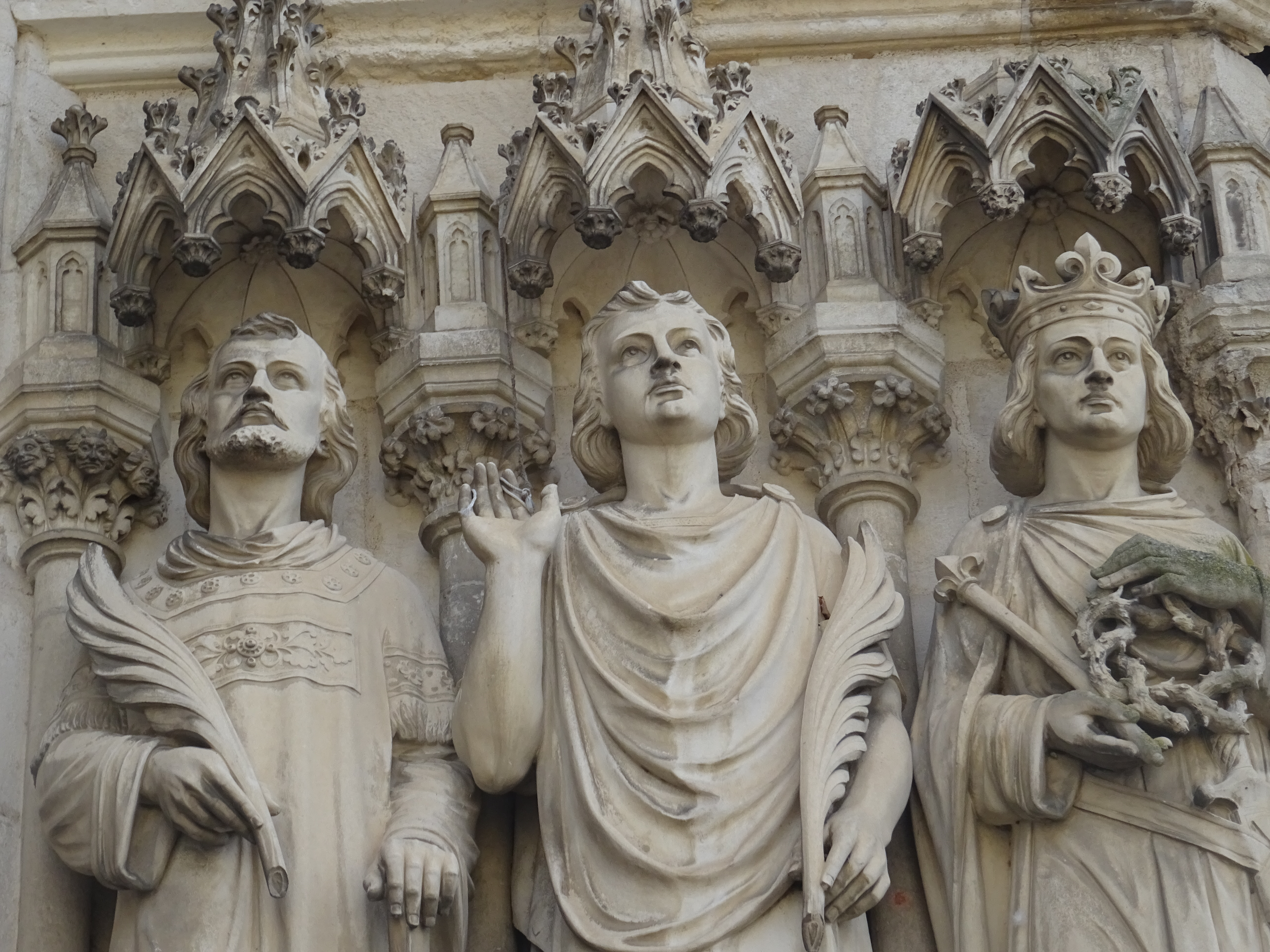
Saint Lawrence, Louis IX of France

== Interior ==
=== Nave and choir ===
The inside of the church is big. There are tall fluted pillars with pointed arches and a small carved frieze at the top of the pillars. Above is arcading with round pillars, round arches and windows above. The ceiling is vaulted with roof bosses. At the back of the south aisle is a stone font. Three pillars support a carved spire with pinnacles above the font. The ambulatory is separated from the choir by pillars and pointed arches. It has three apses, each with an altar. The chancel has a crucifix on the walls and a painted statue of the Virgin surrounded by children.

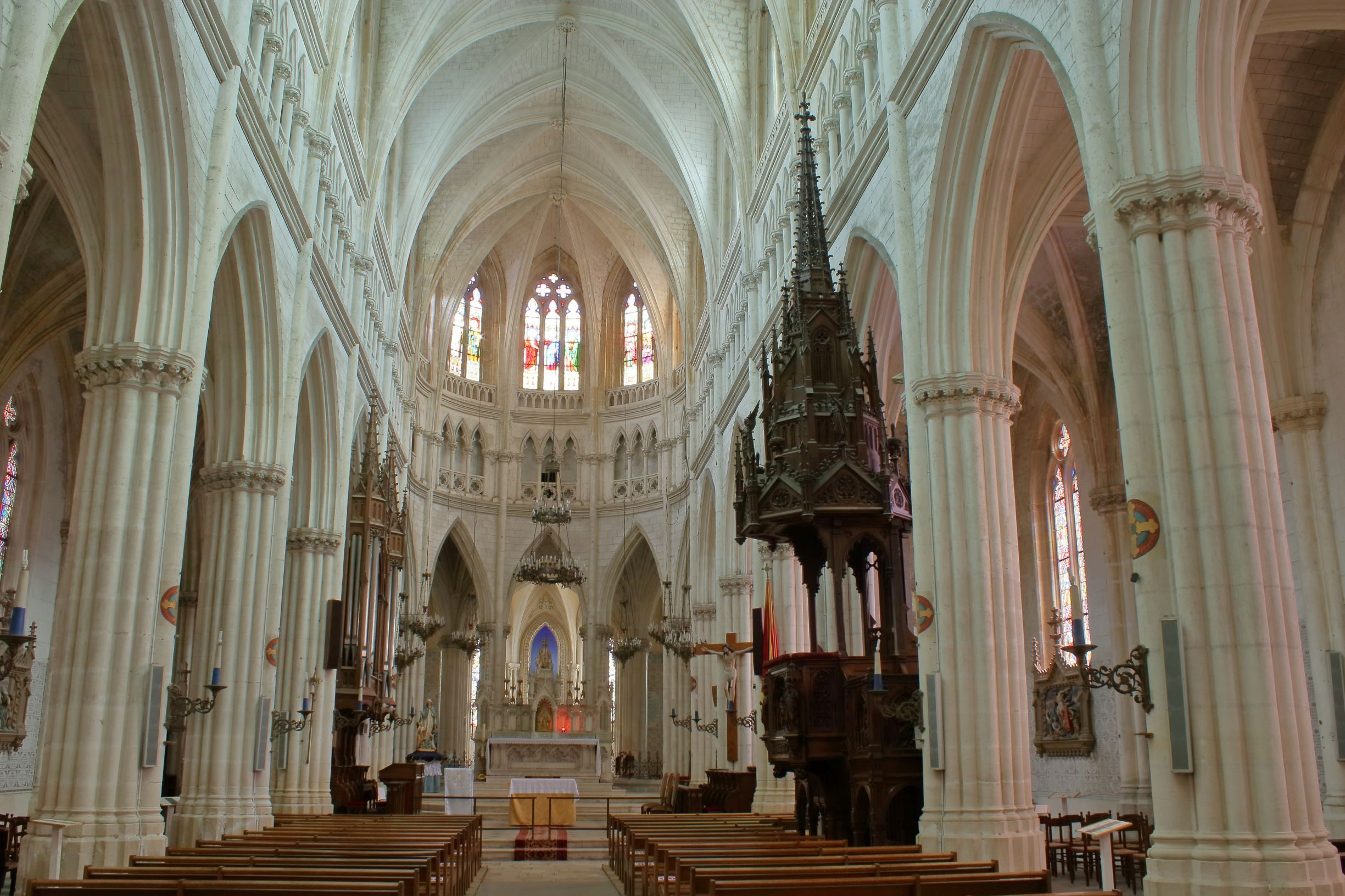

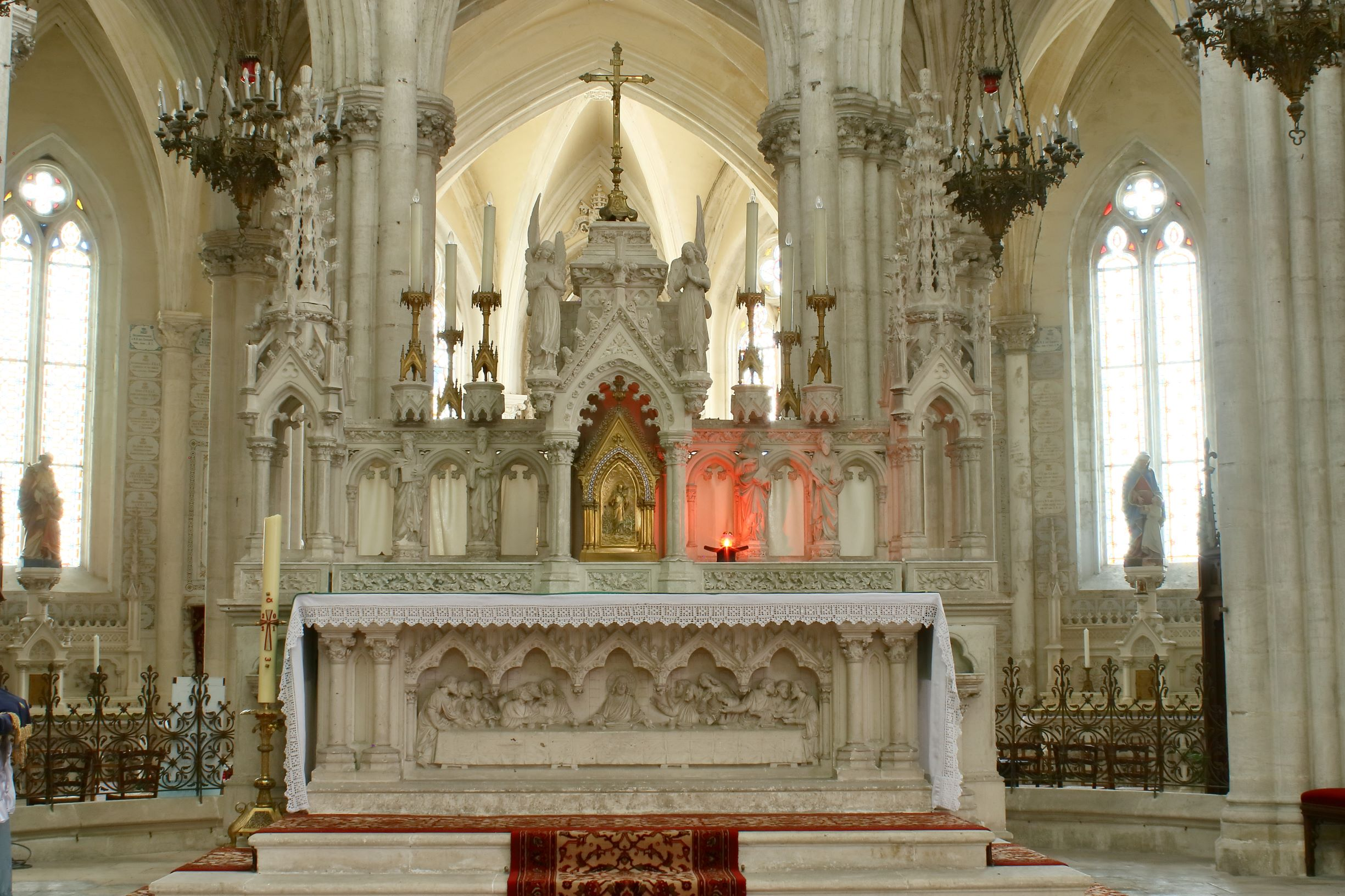

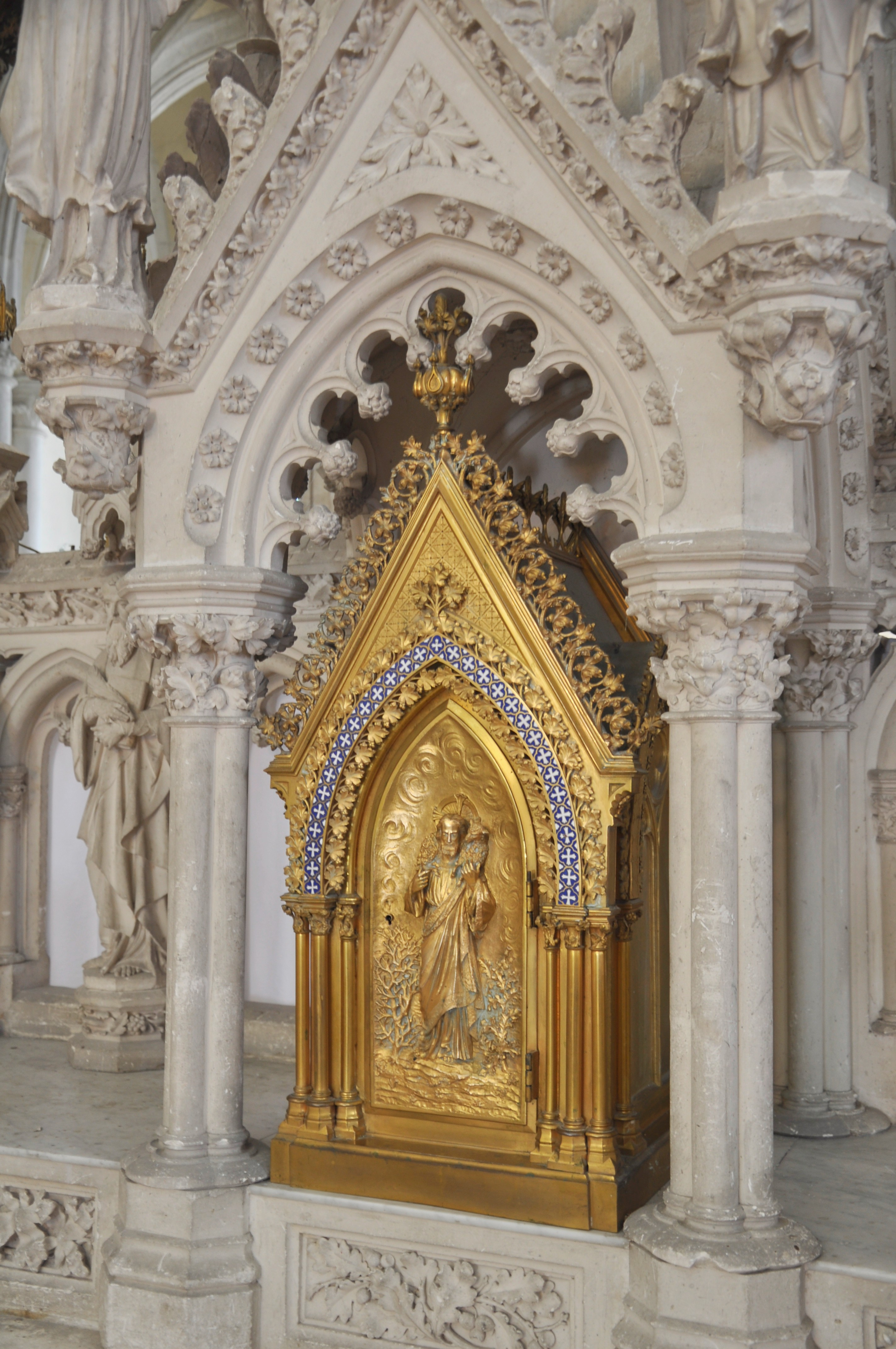

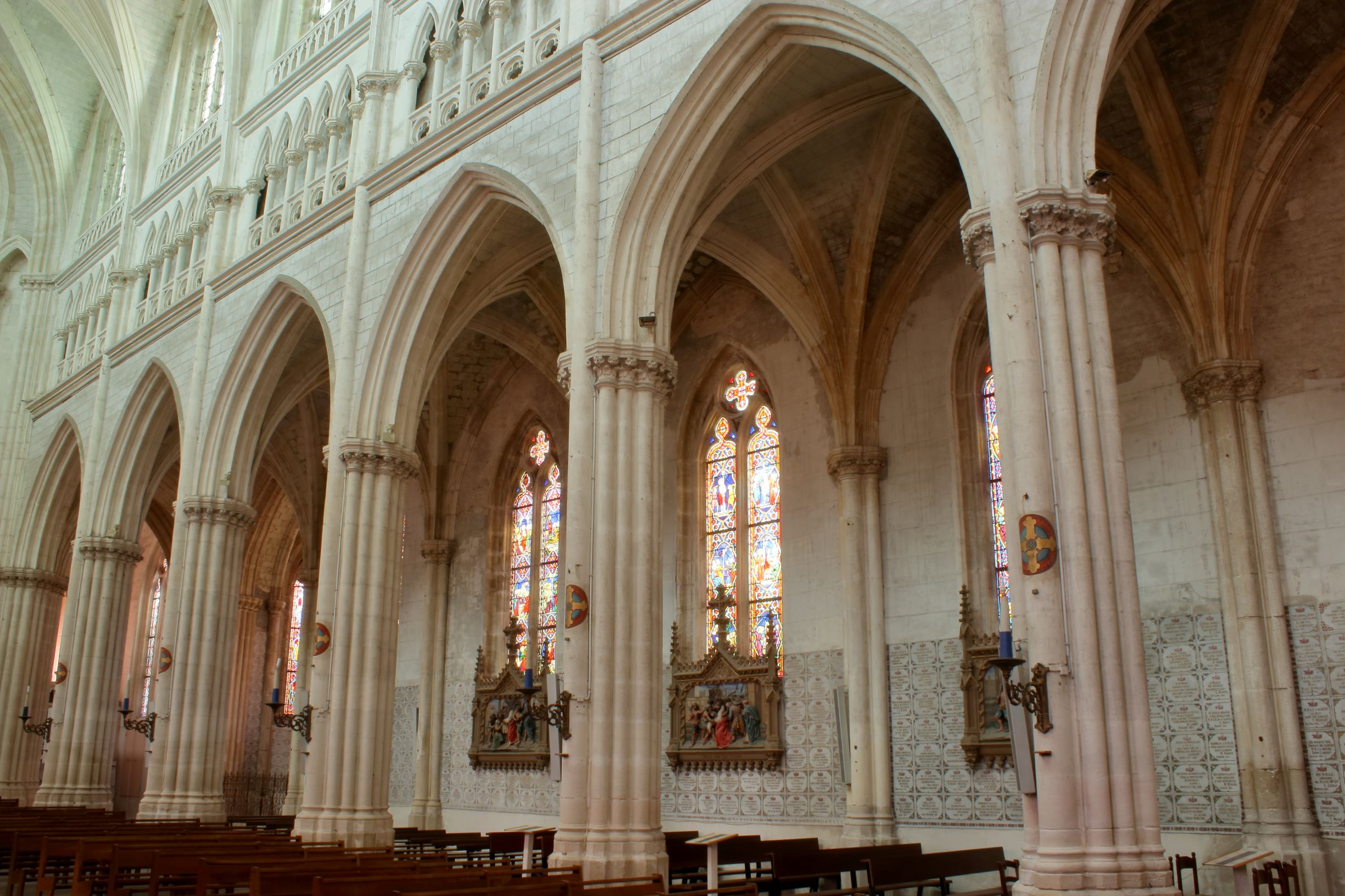

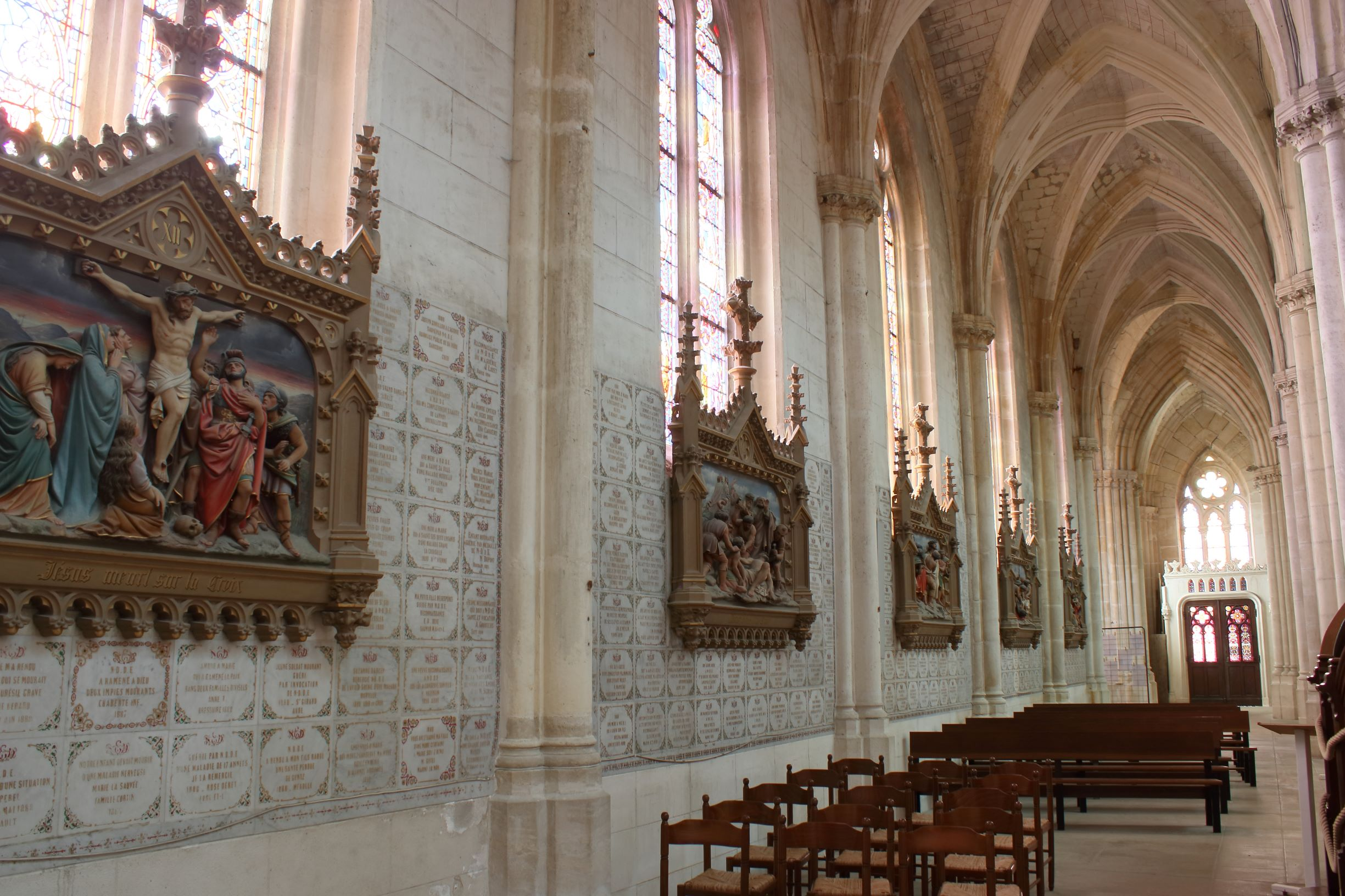

Under the windows in the aisles are carved Stations of the Cross in elaborate frames, each explaining where they are. The rest of the walls are covered with small Ex-voto. The Stations of the Cross is manufactured by International Artistic Union of Vaucouleurs.

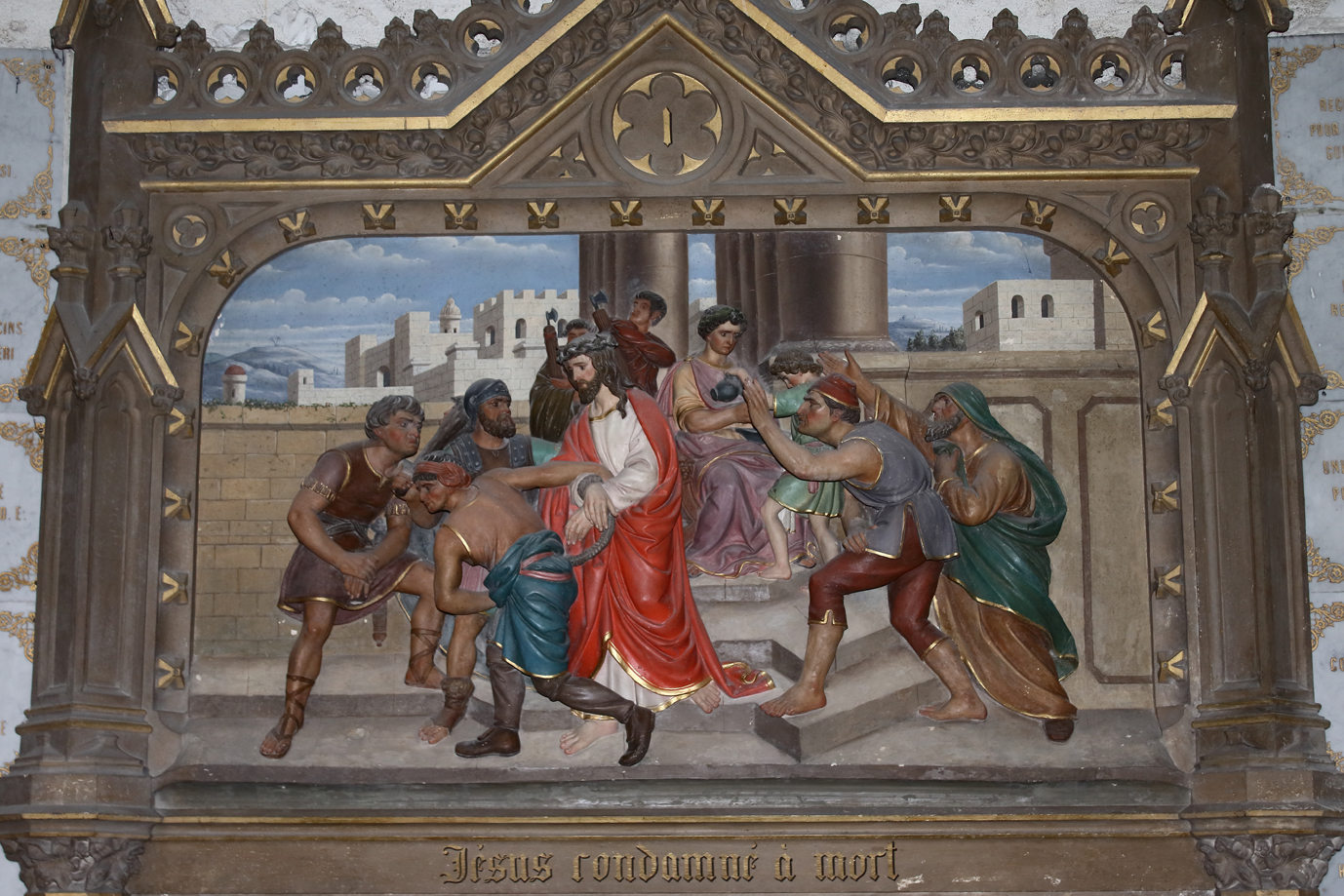
Jesus is condemned to death

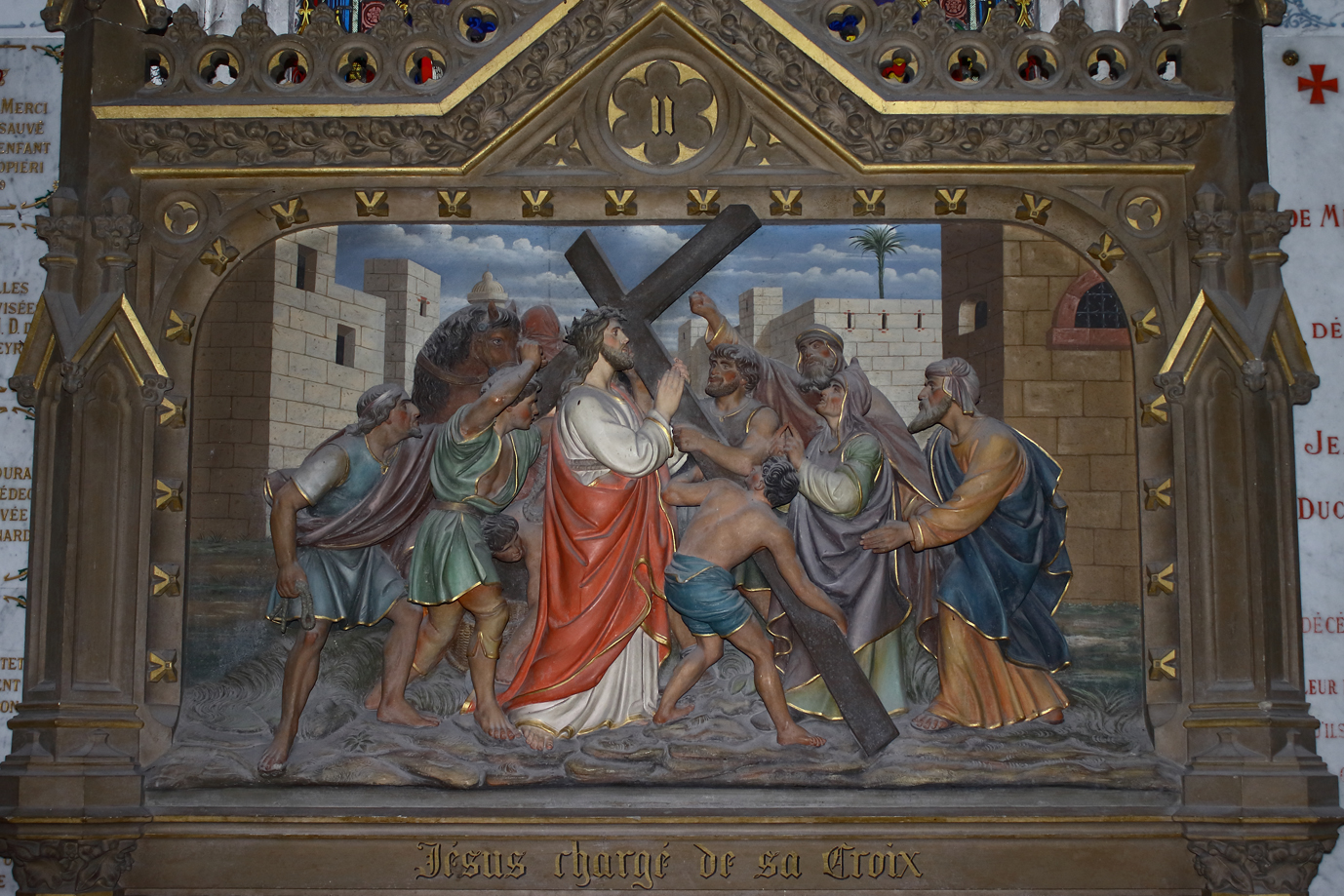
Jesus is given his cross

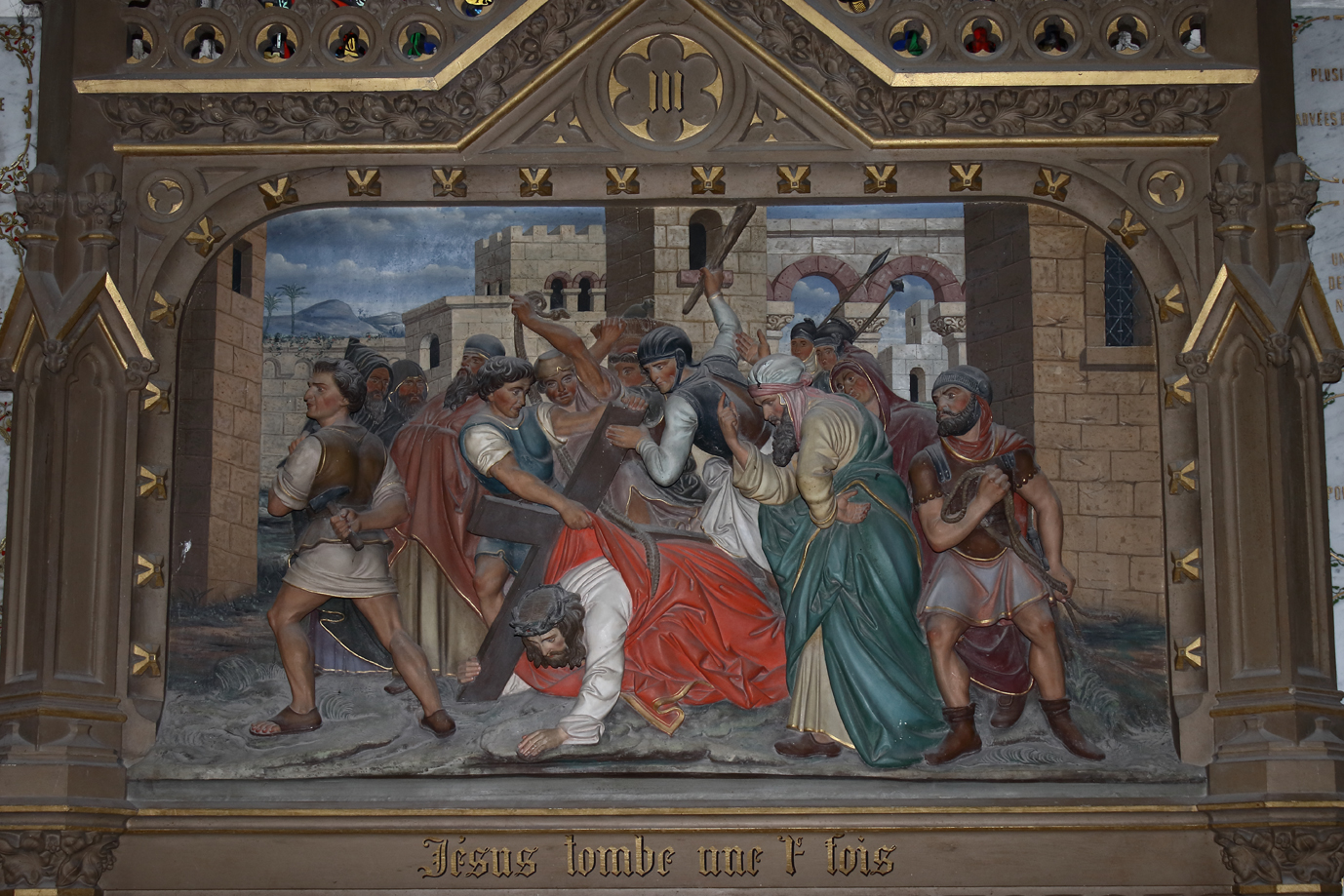
Jesus falls the first time

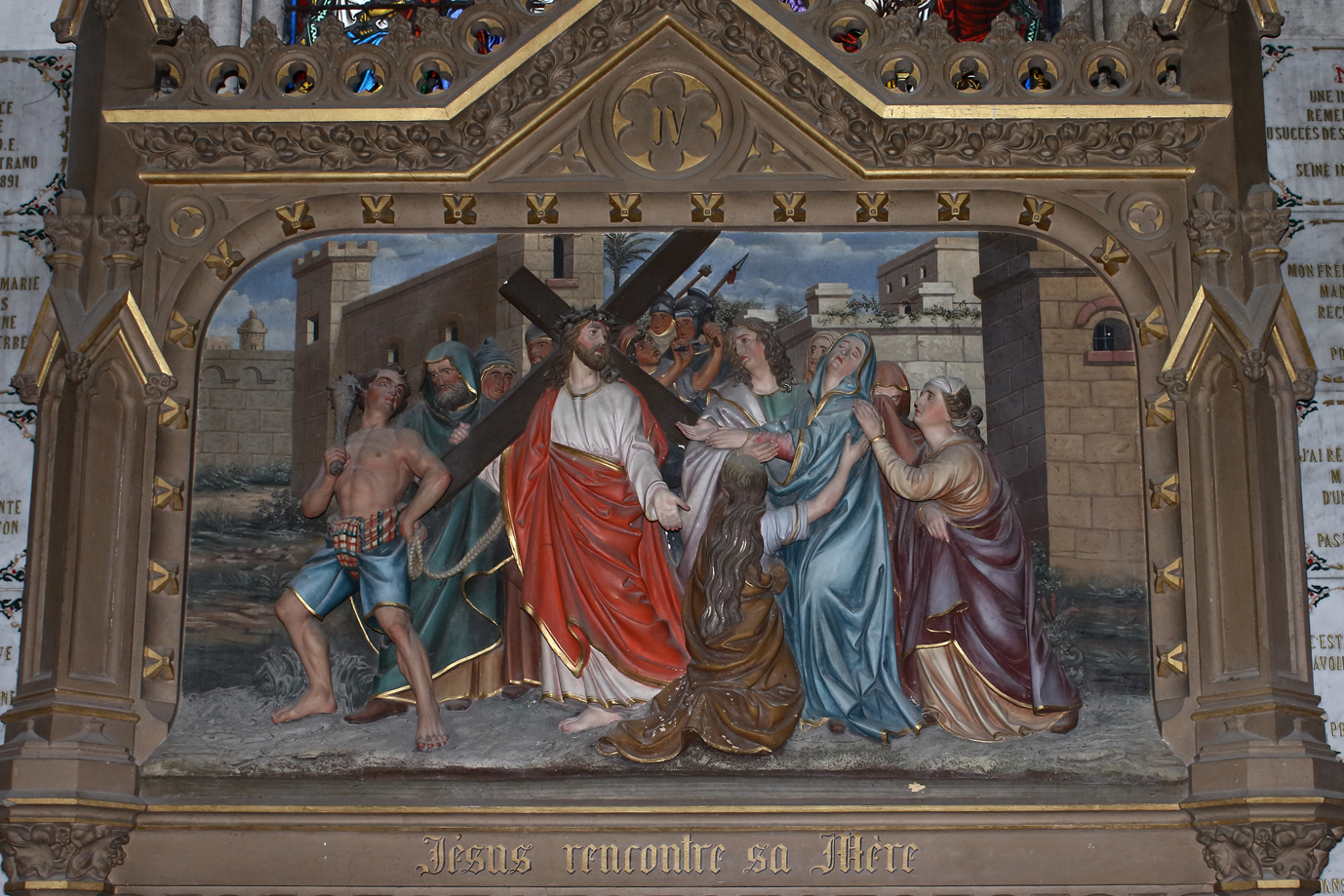
Jesus meets His Mother

=== Chapels ===
The south apse has a fairly simple altar with Saint Anne and the young Mary. The central apse has an altar with carved figures on the base of adults bringing children to the Virgin. The retable has angels, spires and Biblical scenes, including the raising of Jesus's daughter from the dead. Above the retable is a huge statue of the Virgin standing on a rock with young children, lit up by light bulbs. The walls around the altar are covered with Merci plates. The altar in the north apse is fairly plain with a statue of Saint Joseph and the young Jesus. The north chancel altar is carved from stone with carvings of angels on the base and carved leaves around the top of the altar and along the shelf. There is a statue of Mary and Joseph on the host box.

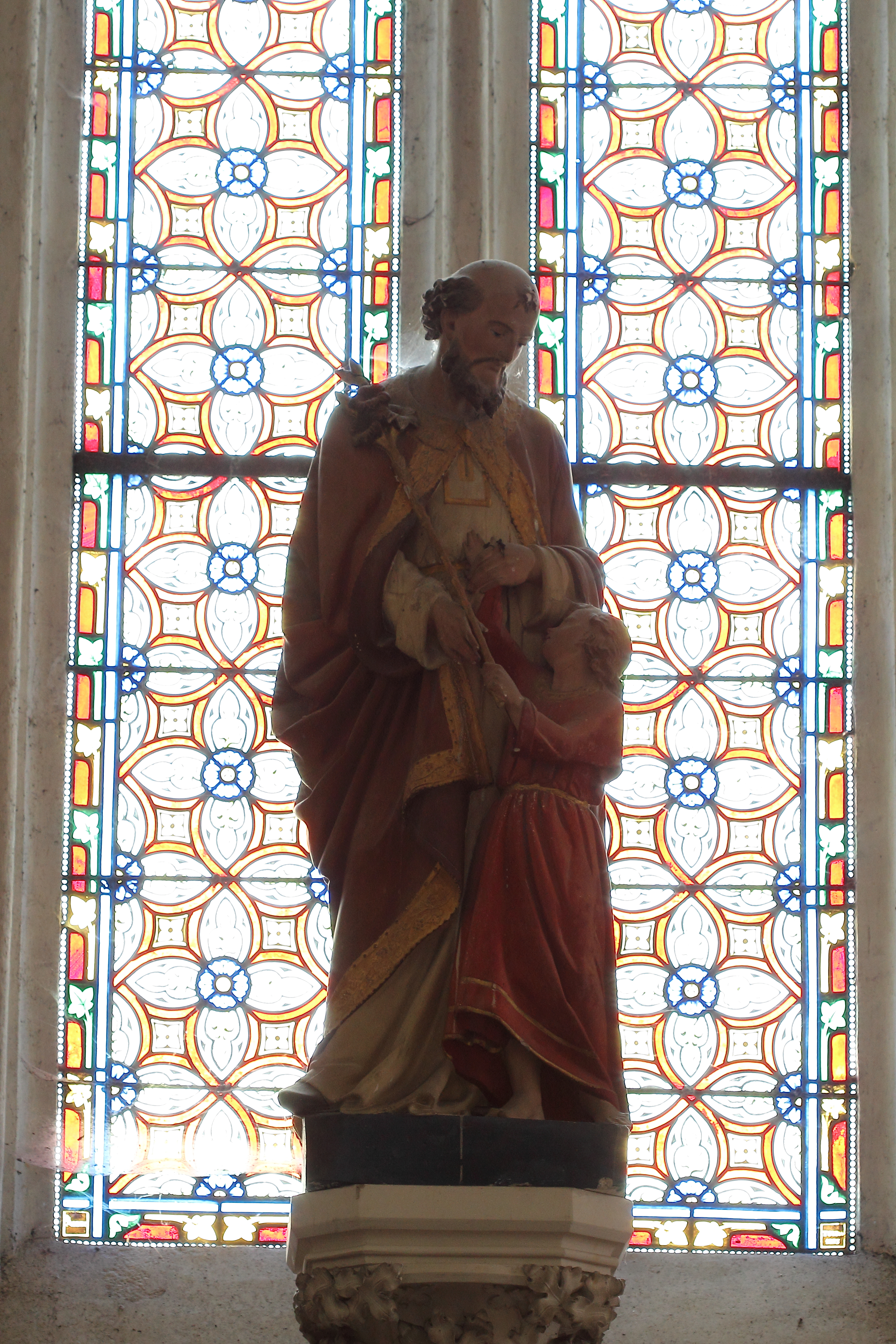

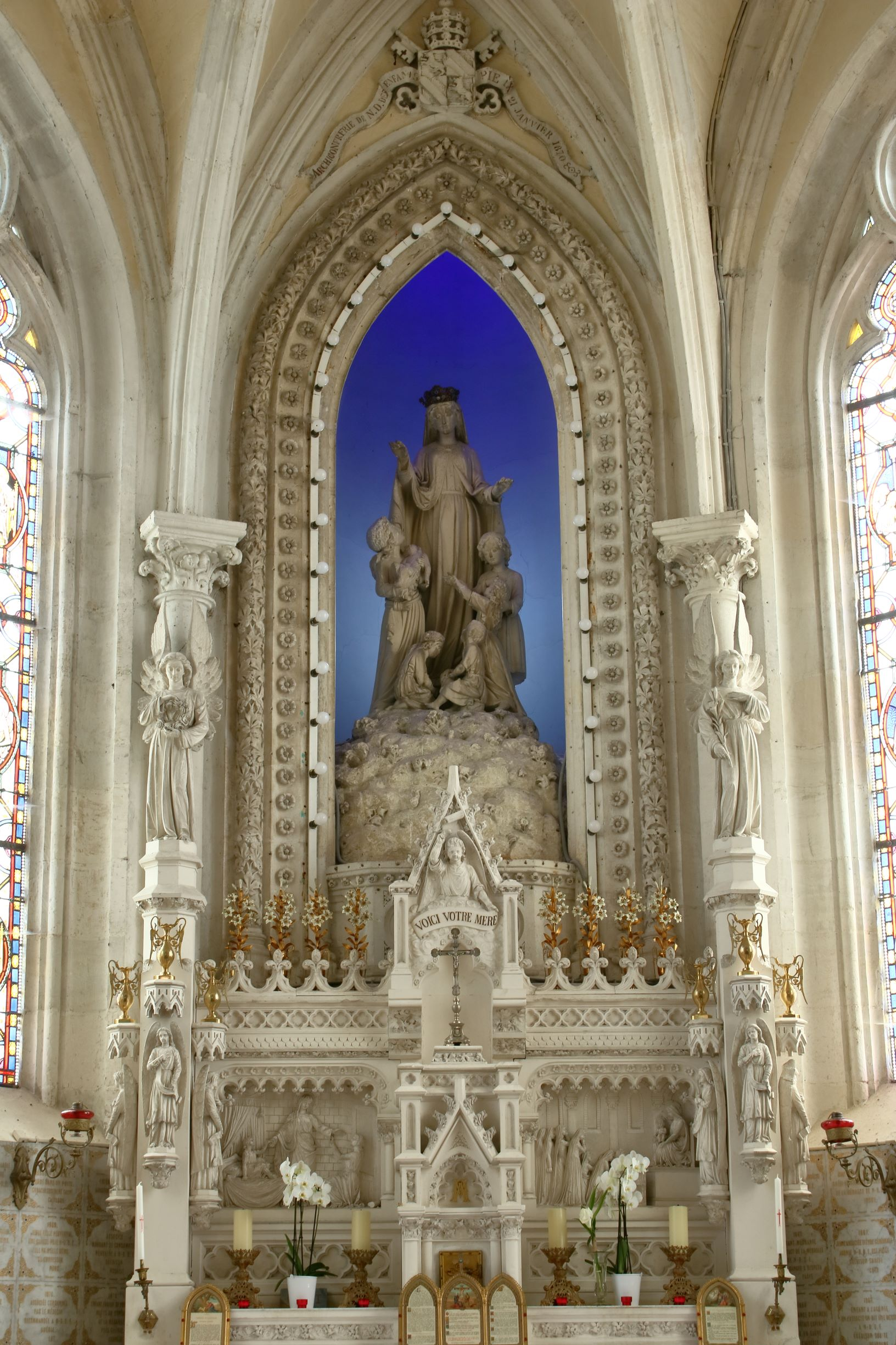

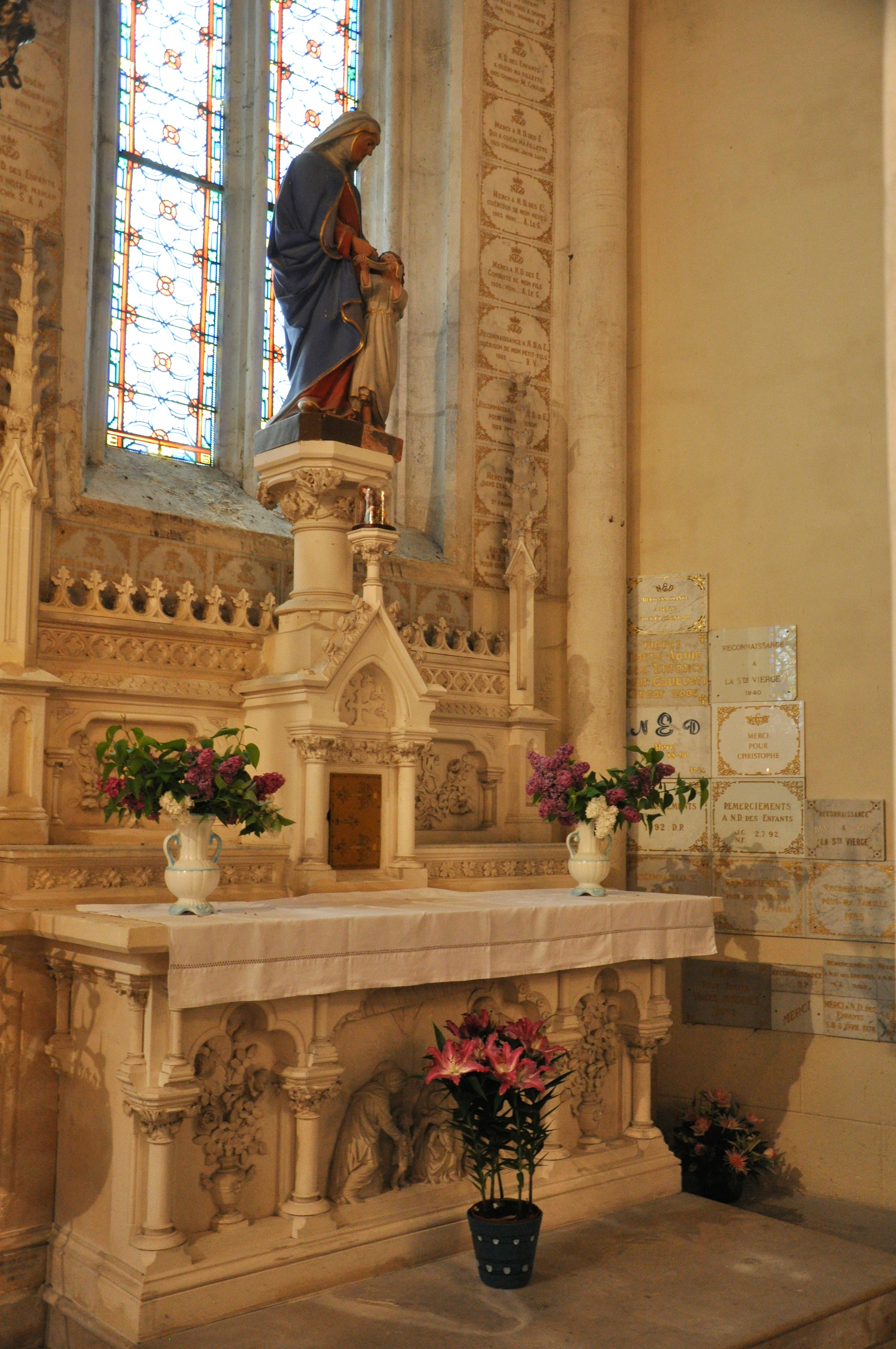

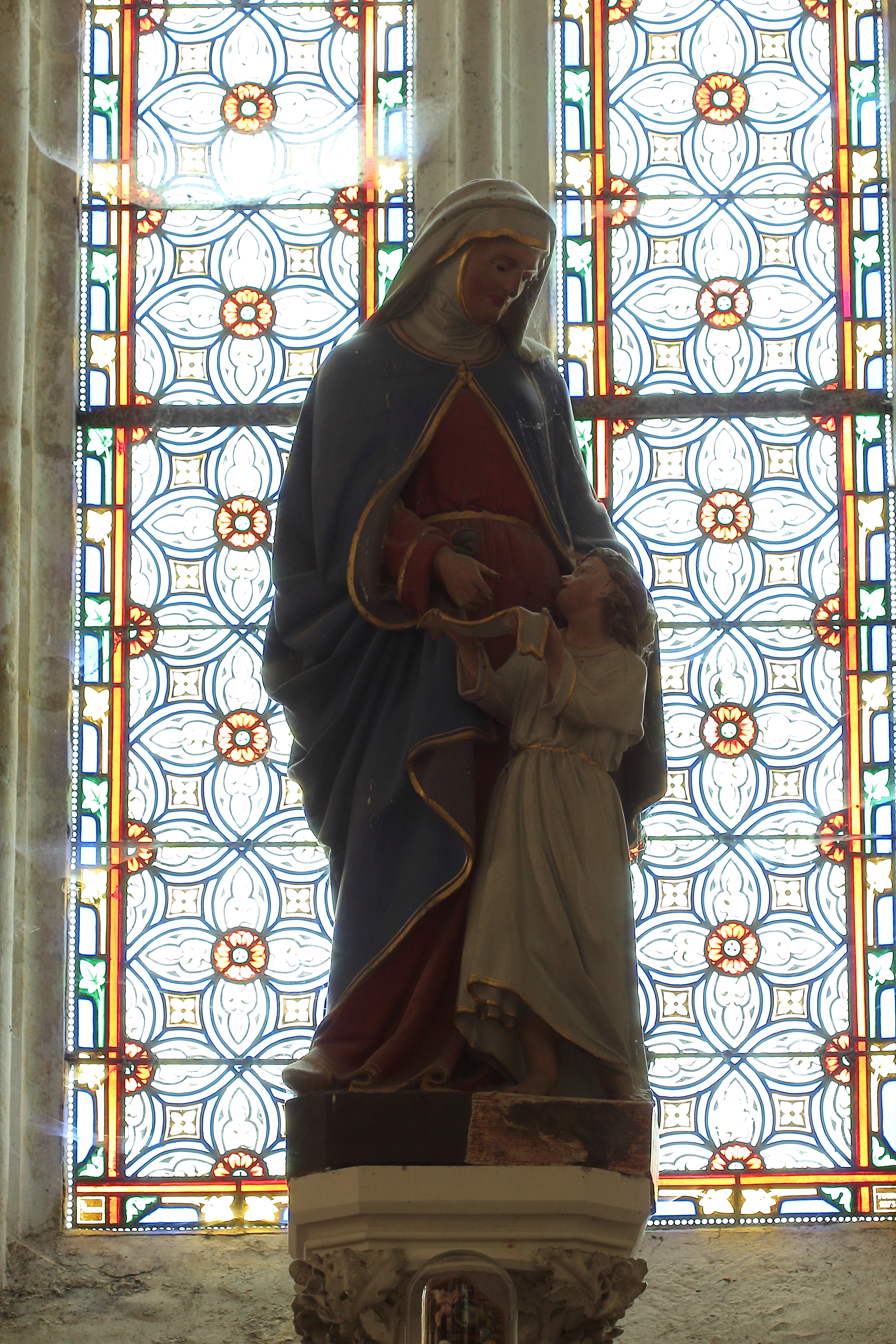

=== Chapel of the Sacred Heart ===
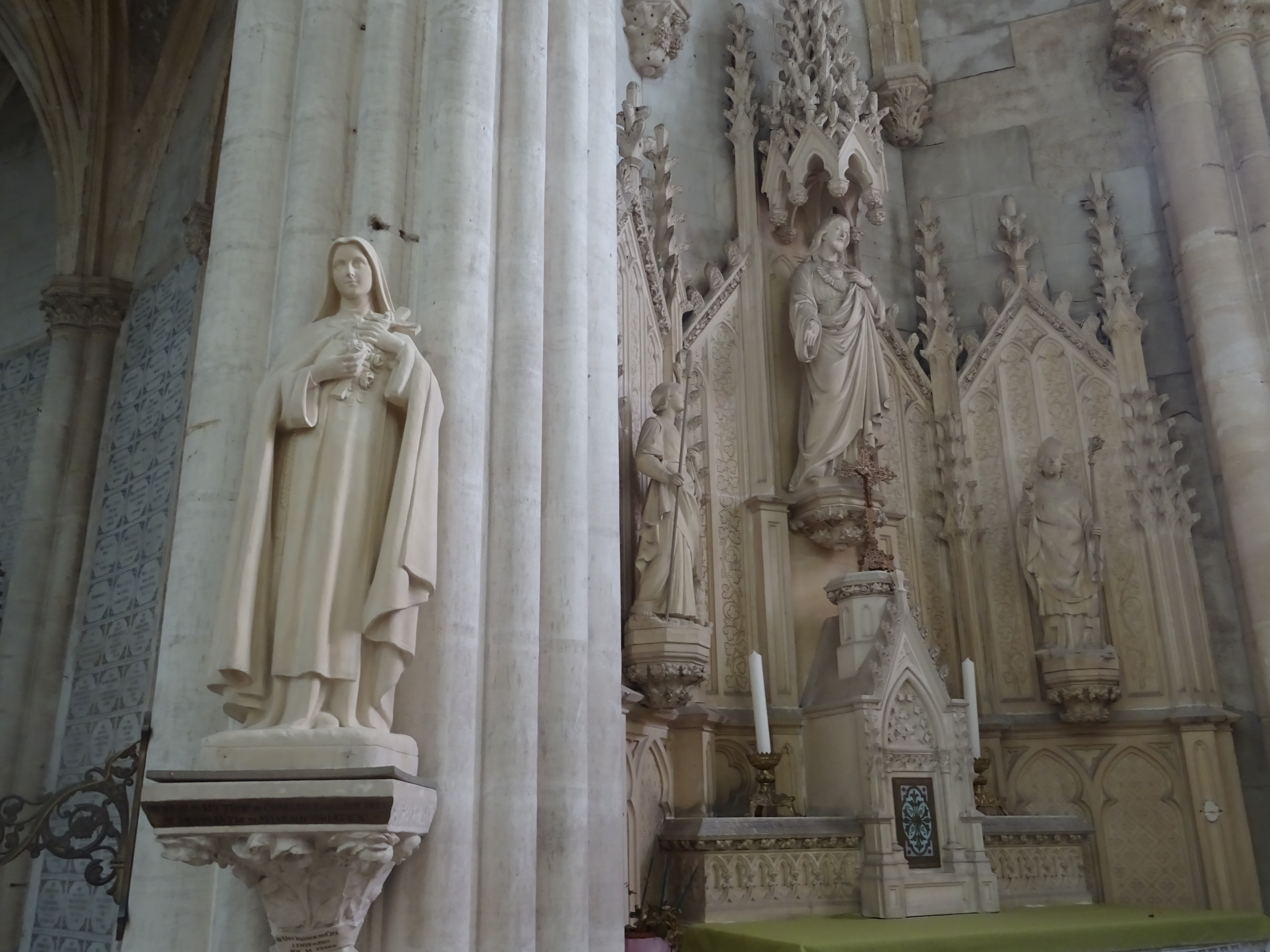
Chapel of the Sacred Heart of Jesus

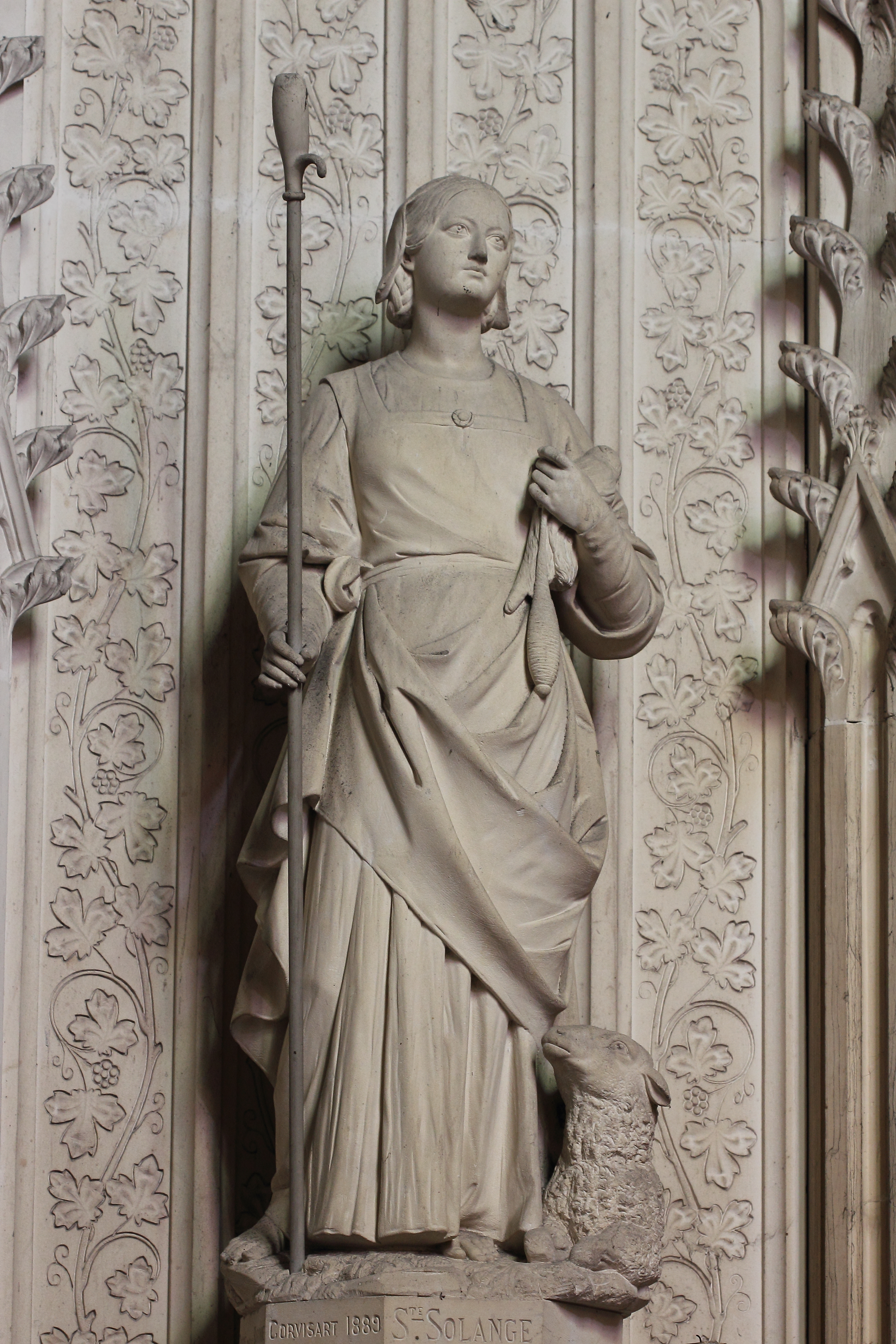
Solange of Bourges

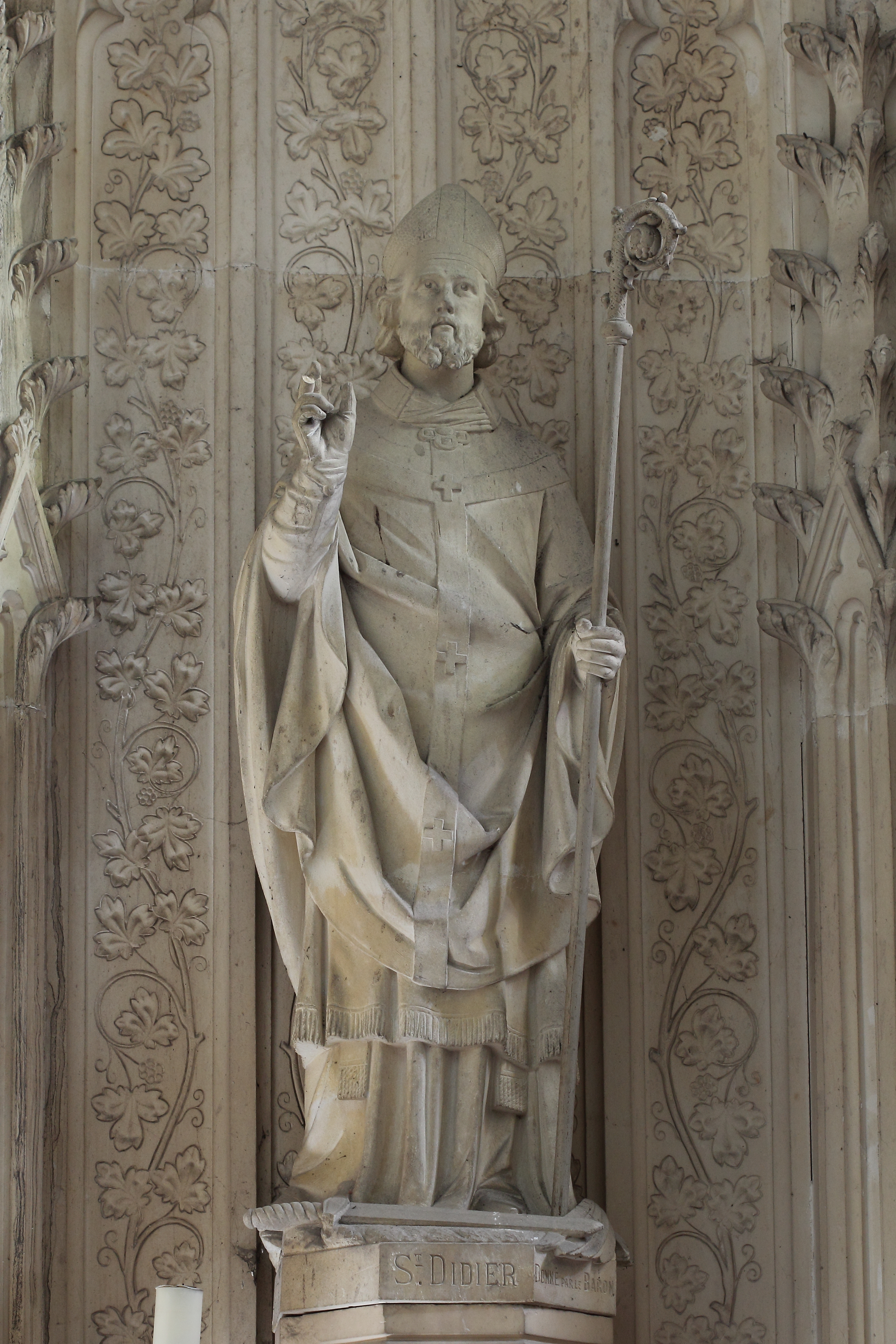
Desiderius of Vienne

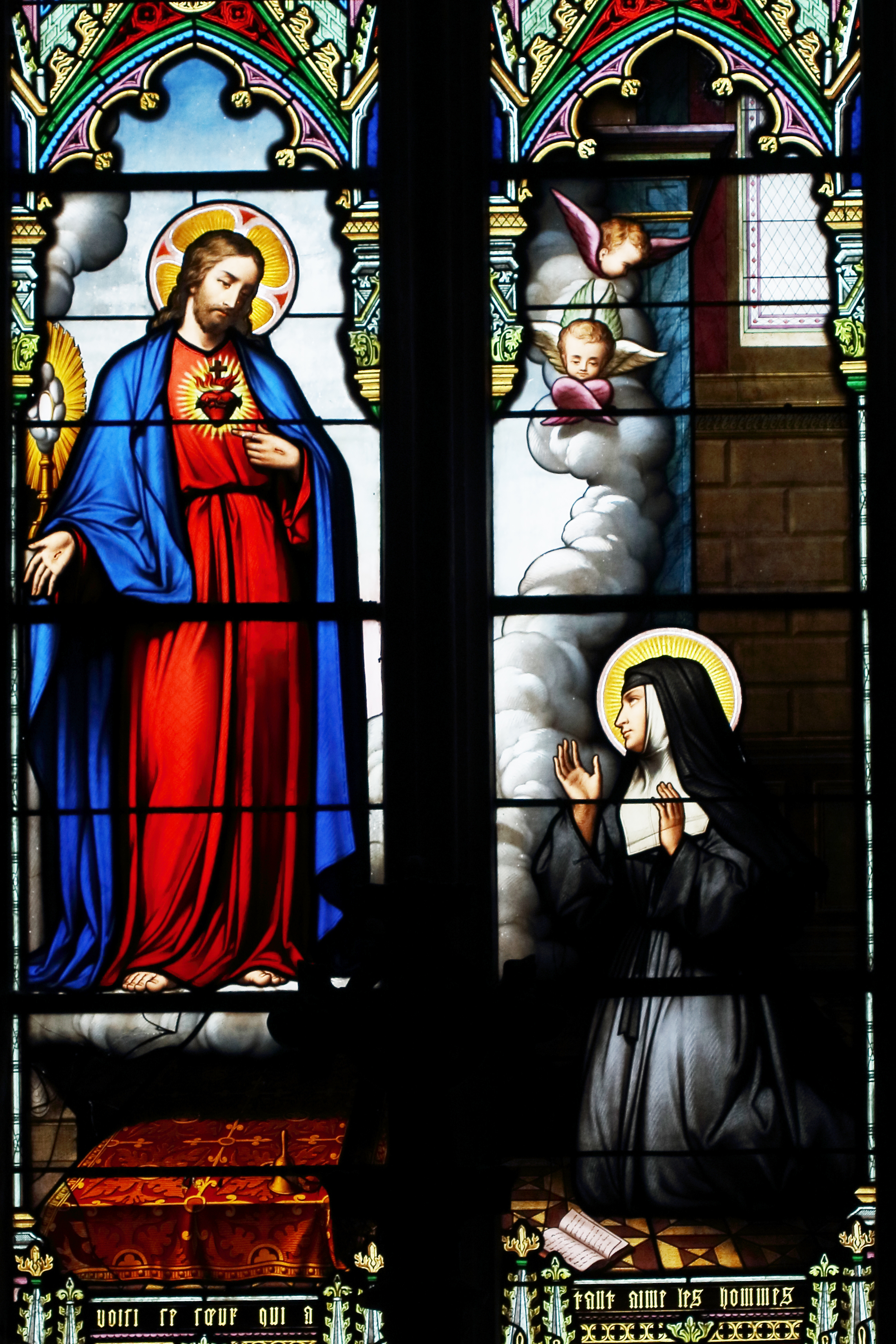
Sacred Heart of Jesus Christ on stained glass windows

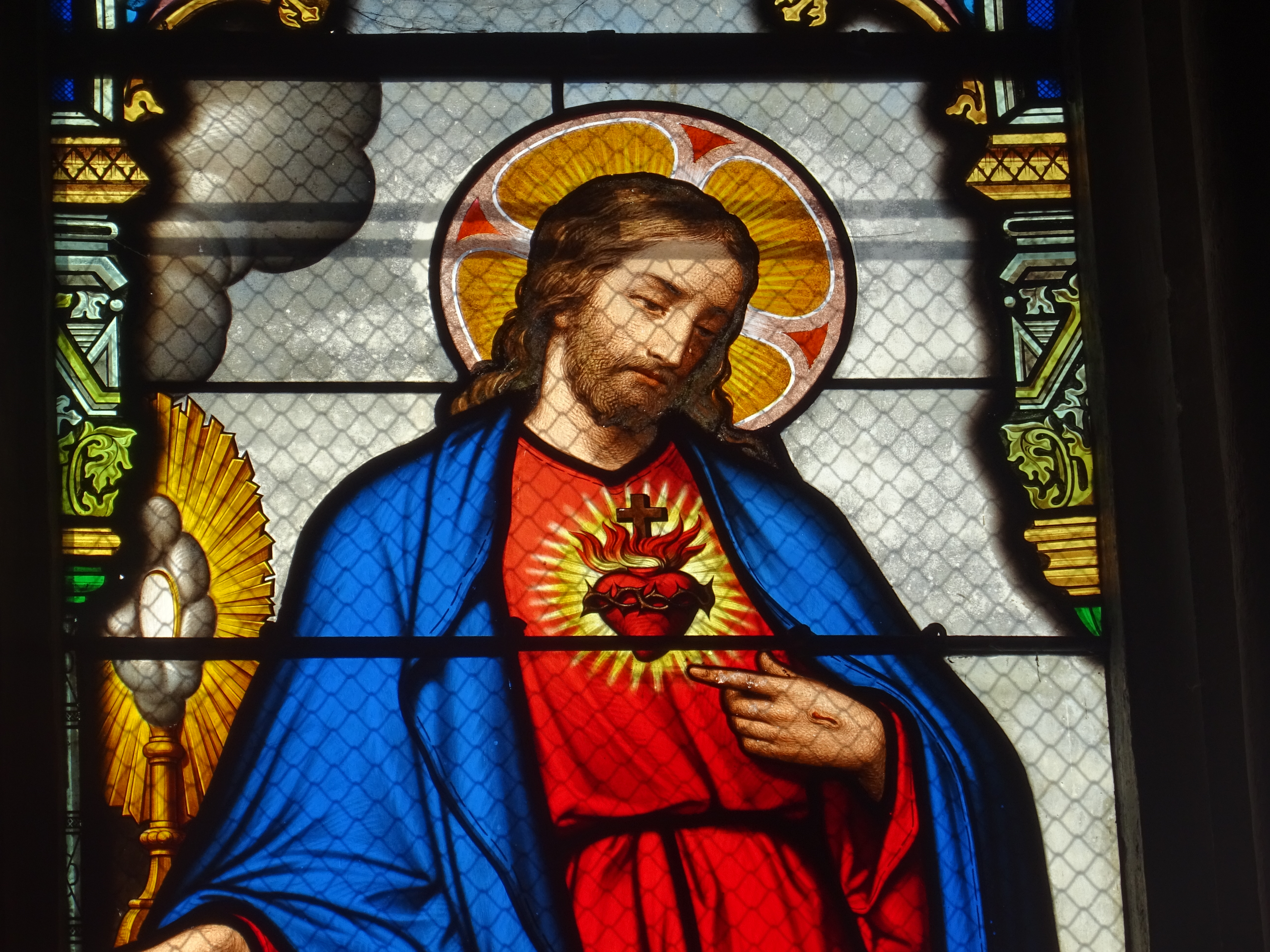

=== Organ ===
There is a large organ in the choir. Its centenary organ dates back to 1889 and is the work of Cavaille-Coll, a renowned organ builder. Its sound is much admired and concerts are organised every summer. It is now classified as a historical monument. The wooden choir stalls are fairly plain with misericords.

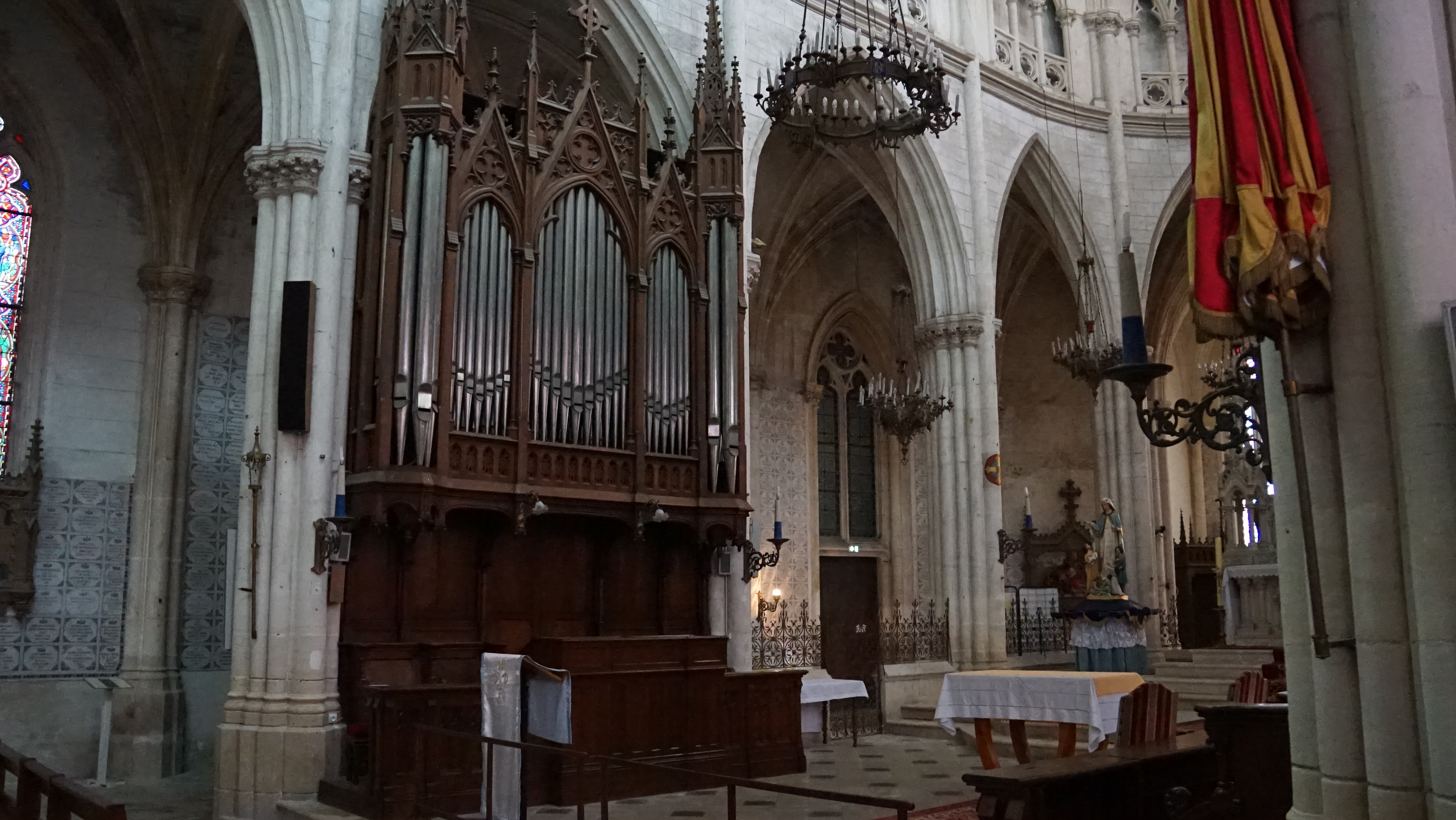

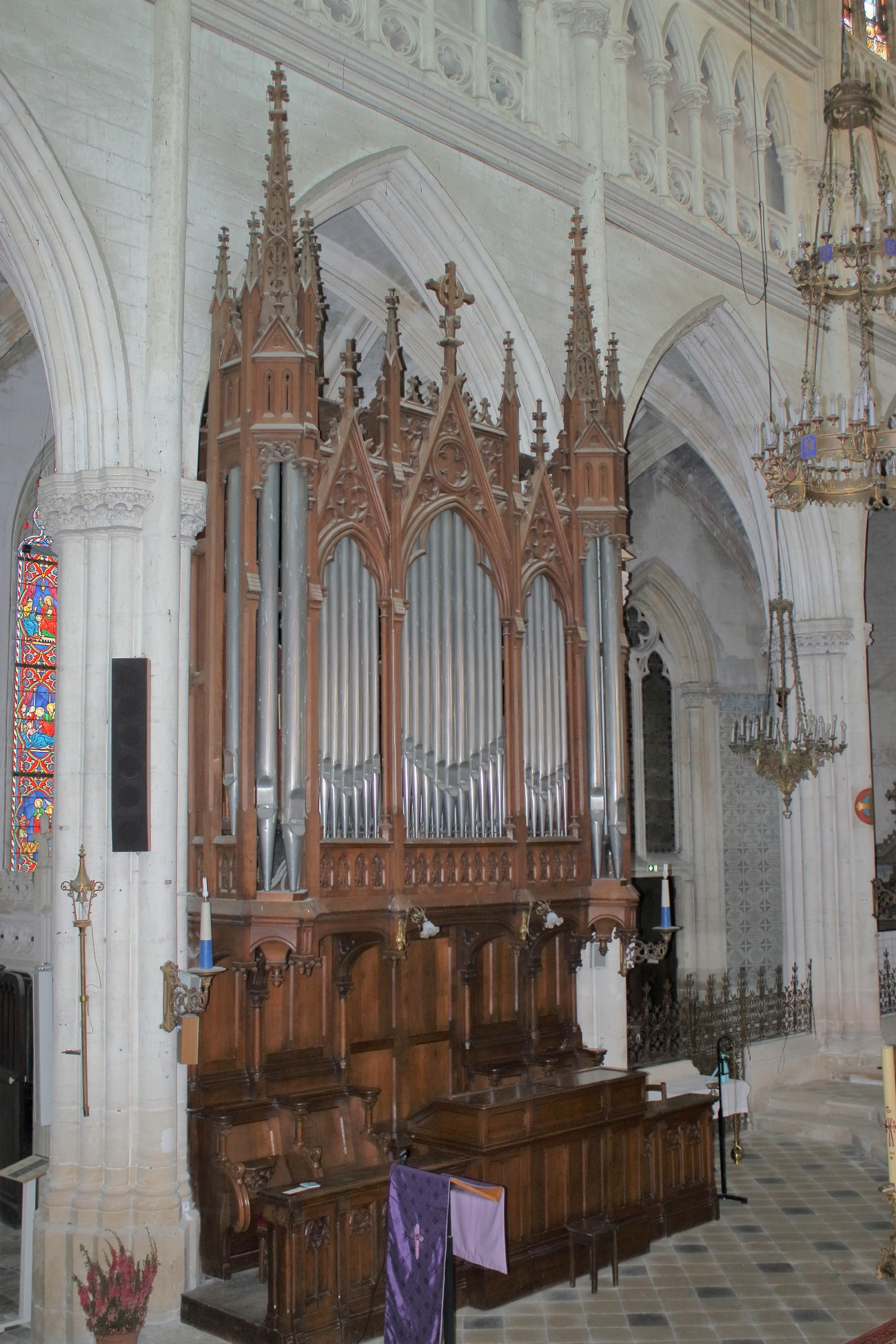

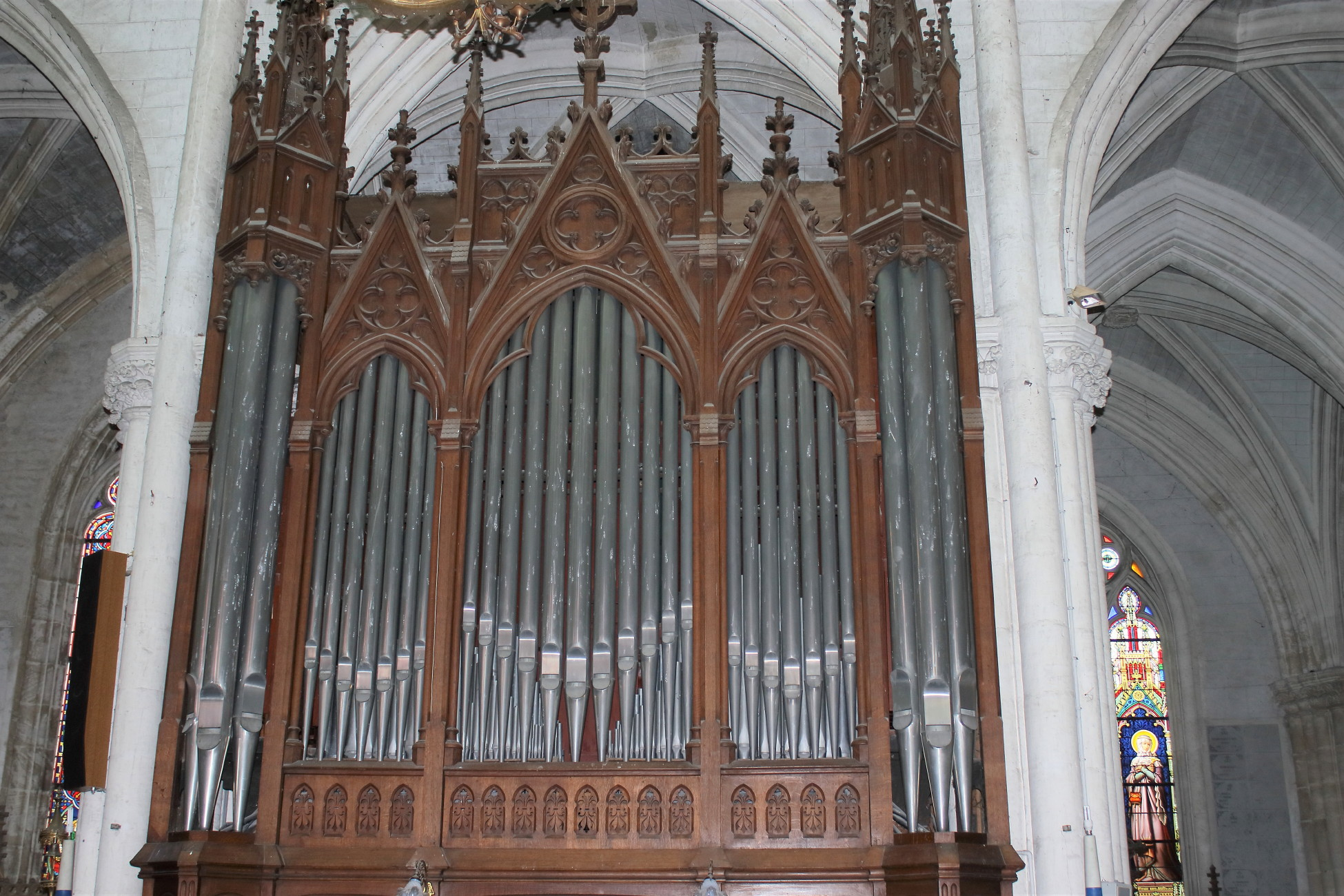

== Stained glass ==
Basilica of Our Lady of the Children is especially noted for its 19th-century stained glass manufactured by Lucien-Léopold Lobin.

=== Grand Housteau and apse ===
The west front has a blind rose window on the arch over the central portals.

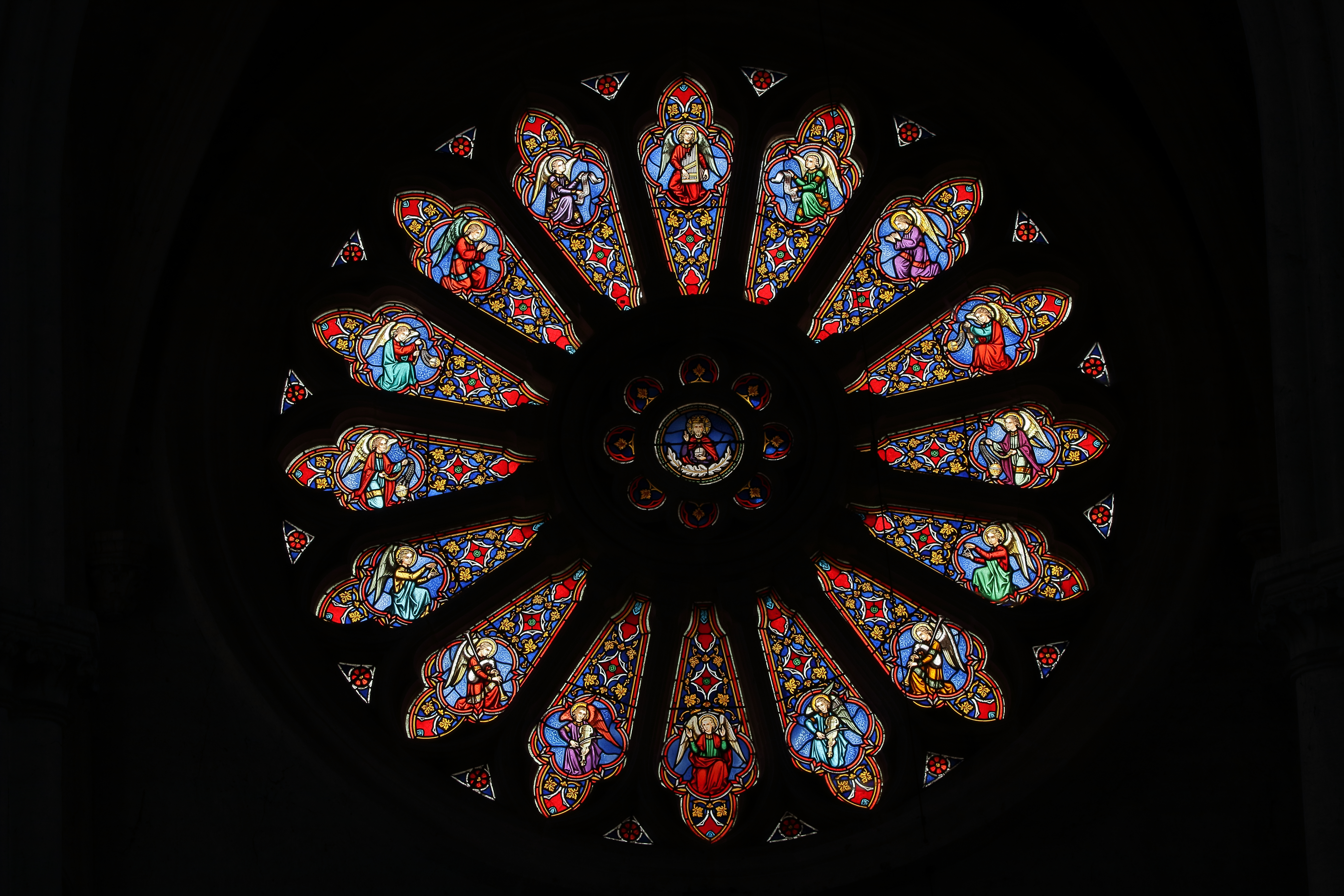
Rose window on the west front

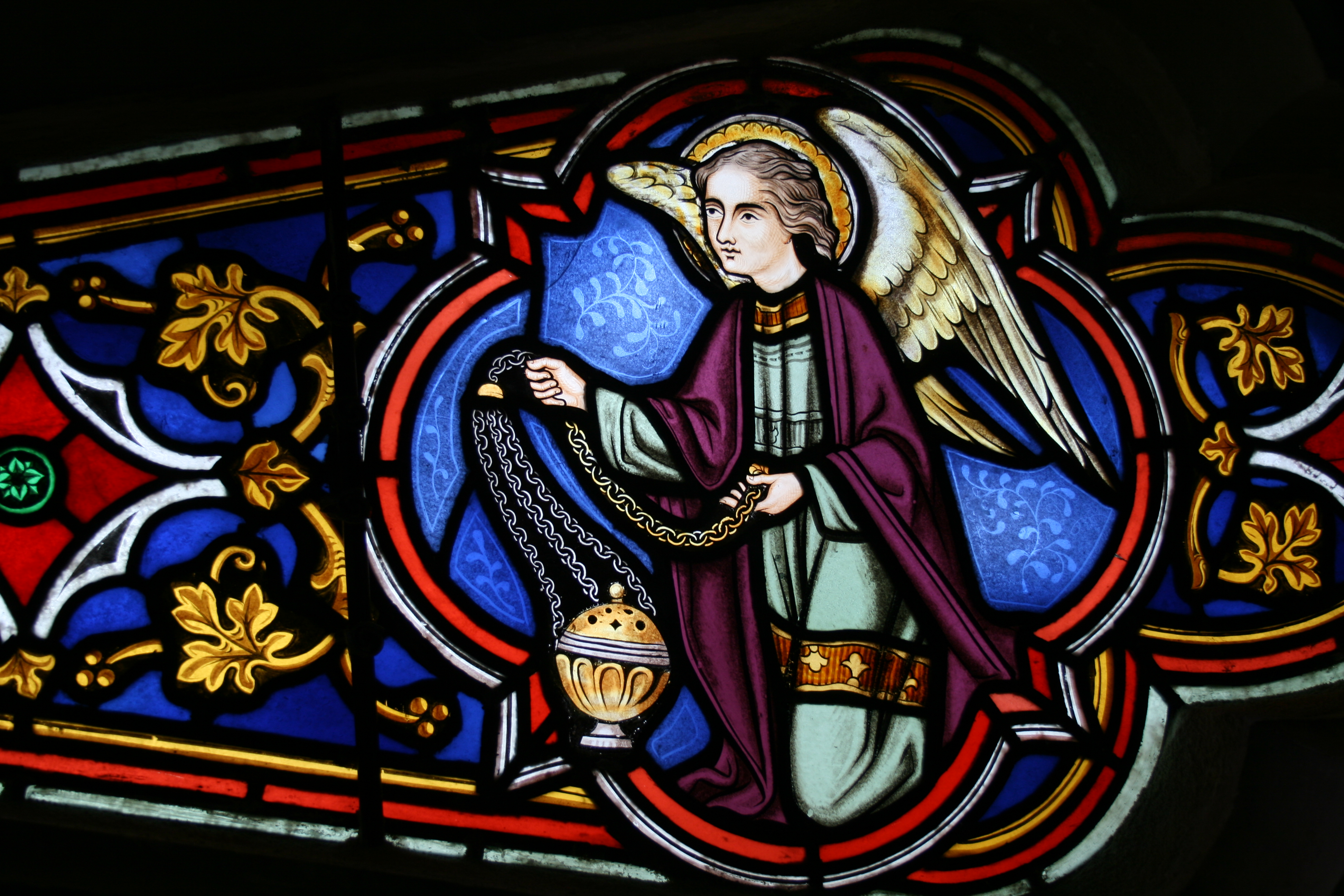

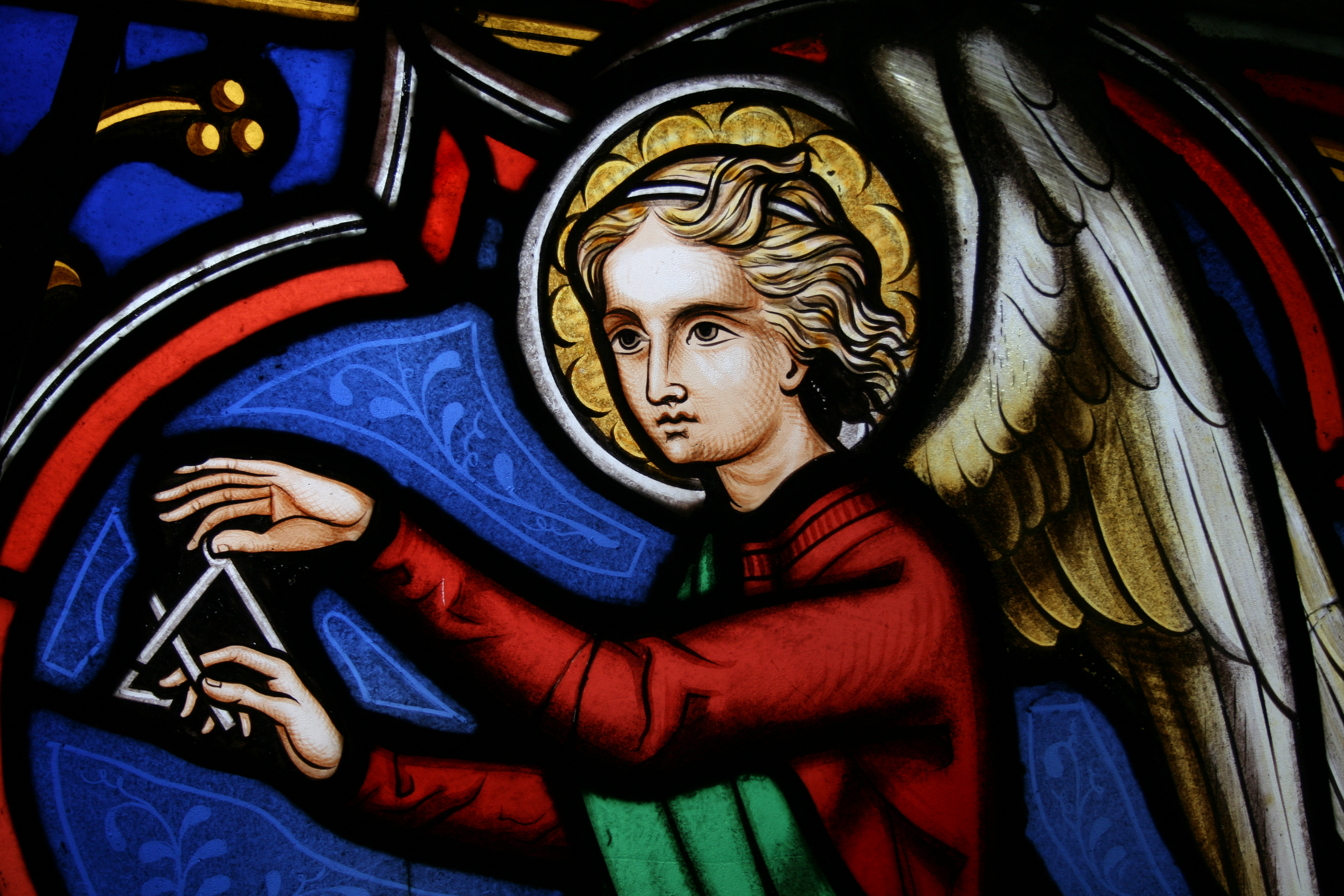

=== Stained Glass Windows (19th-century) ===
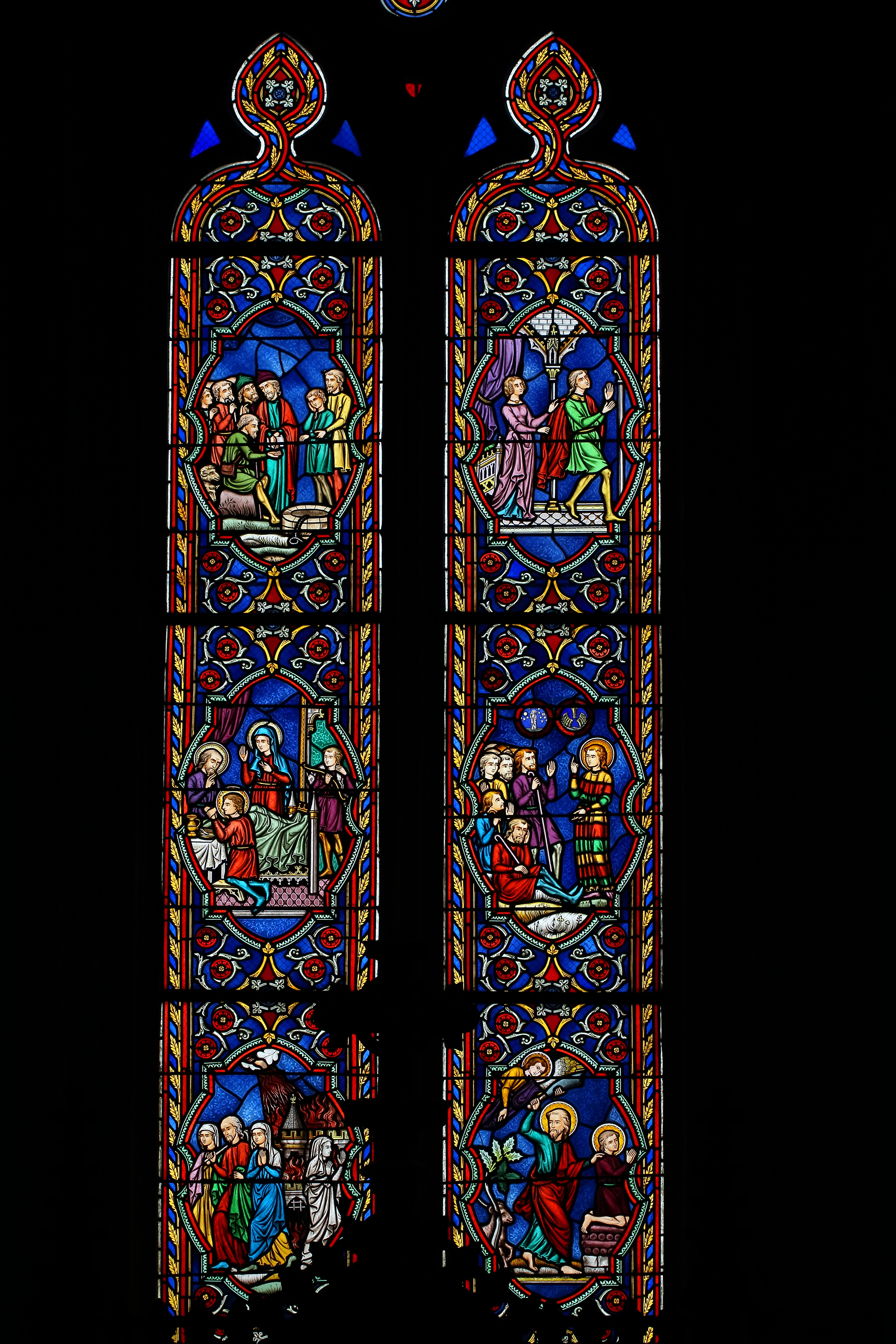

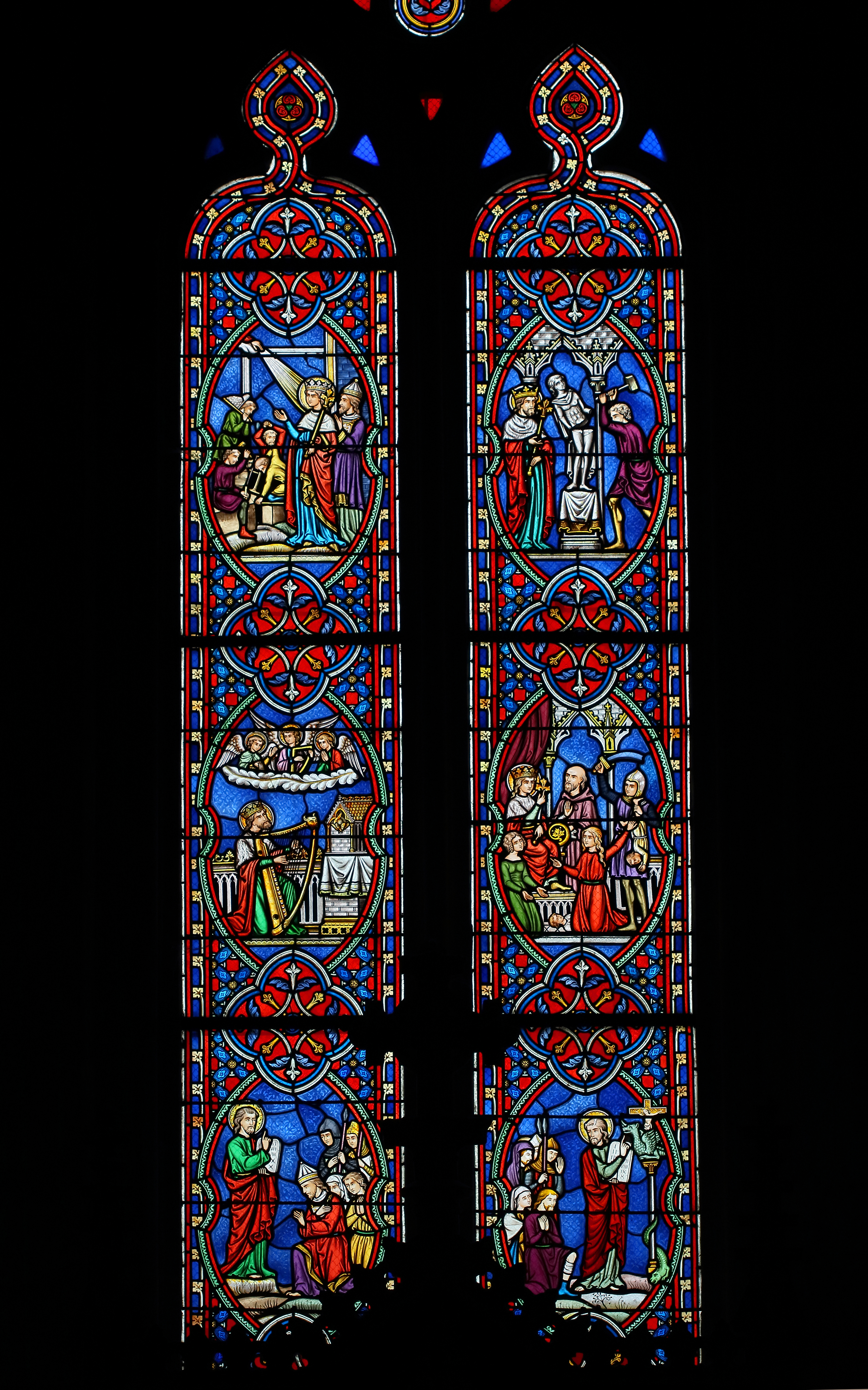

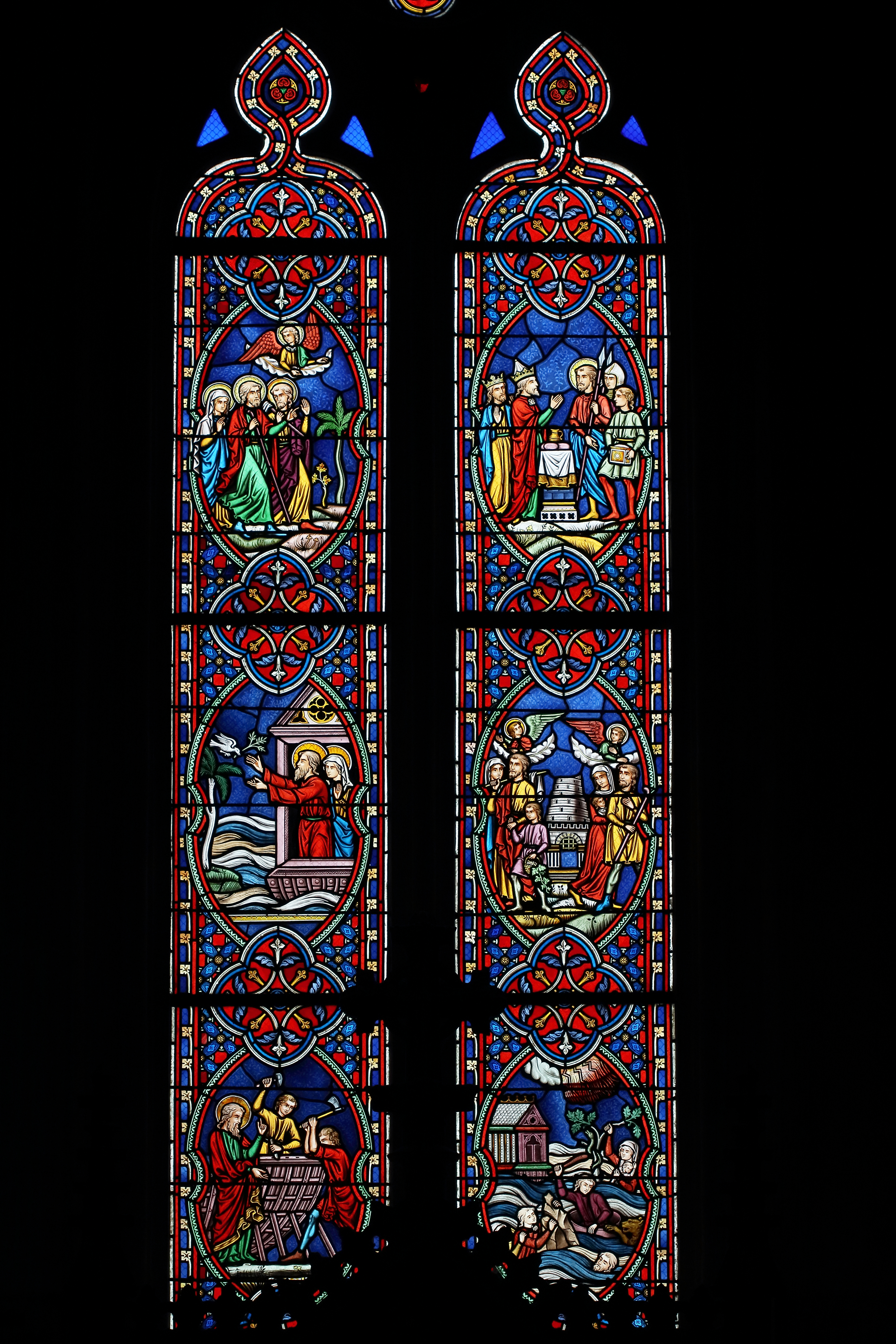

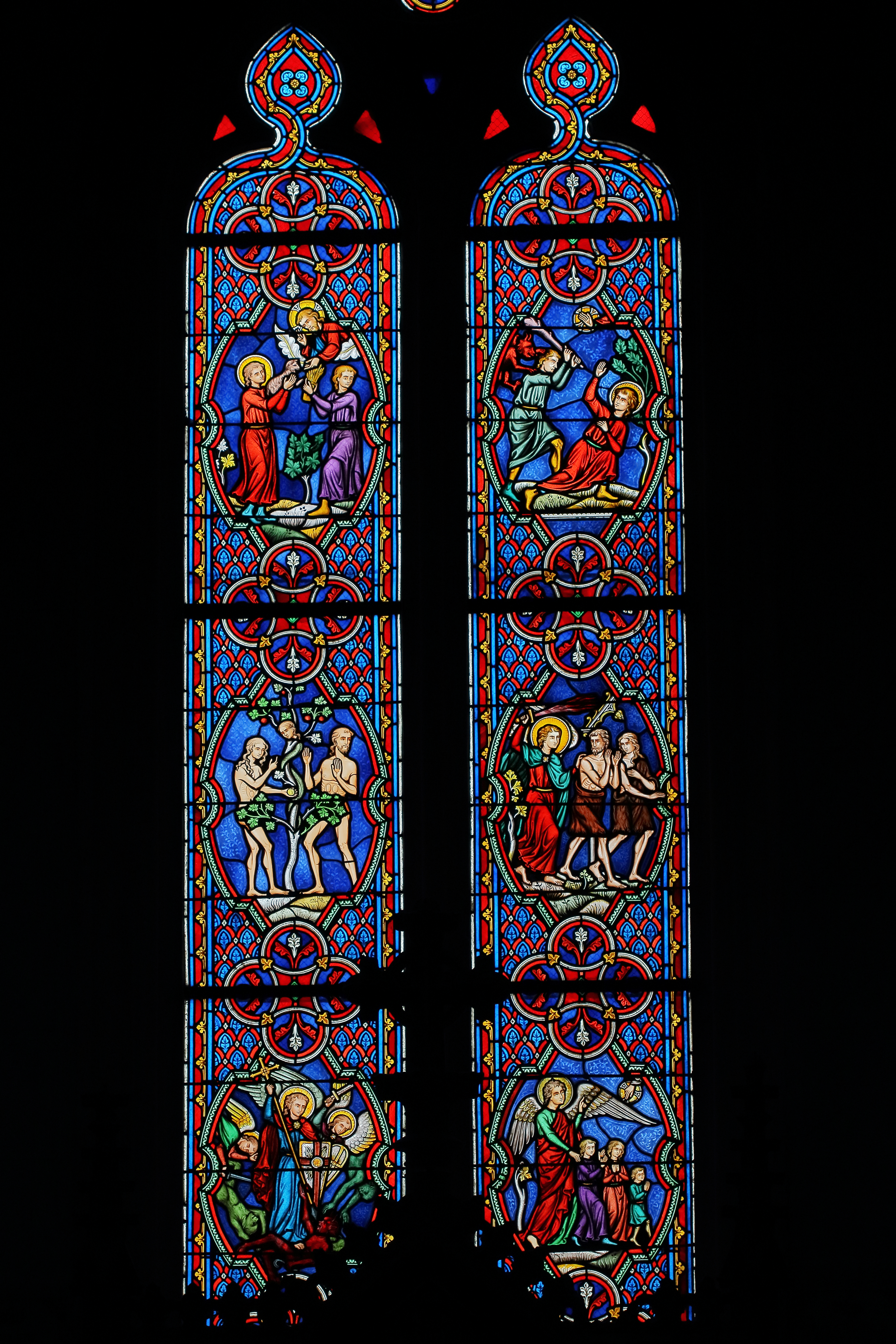

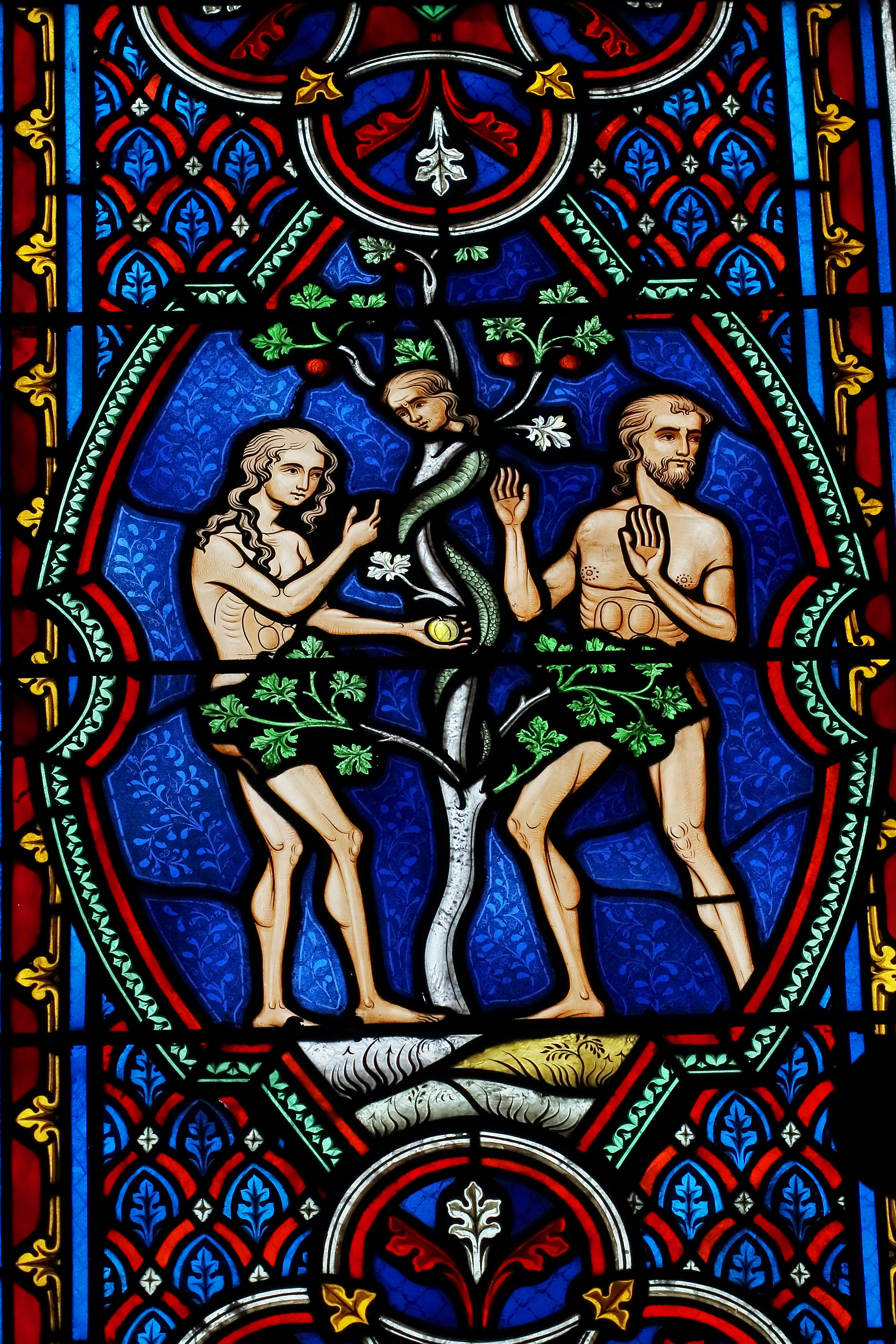

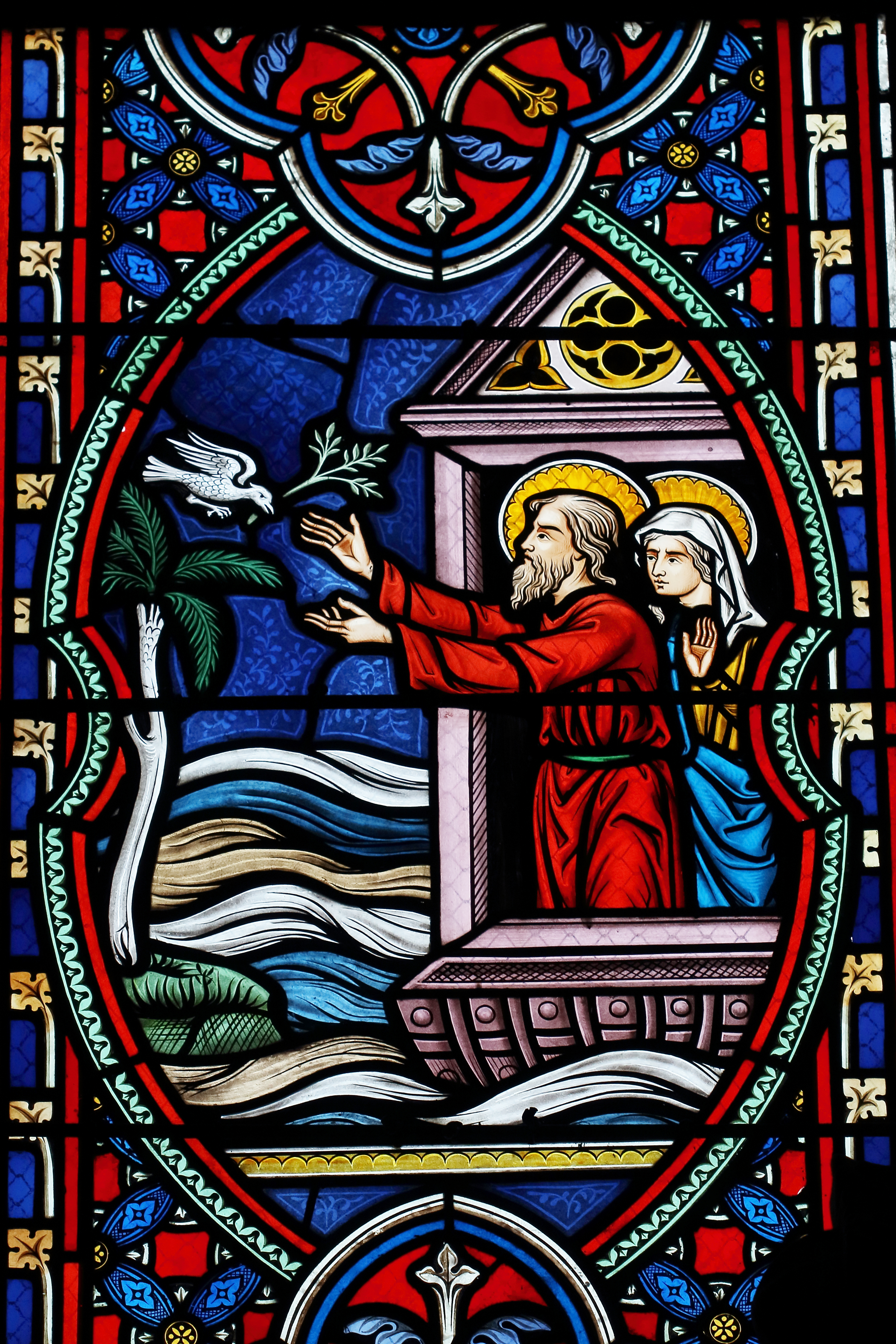

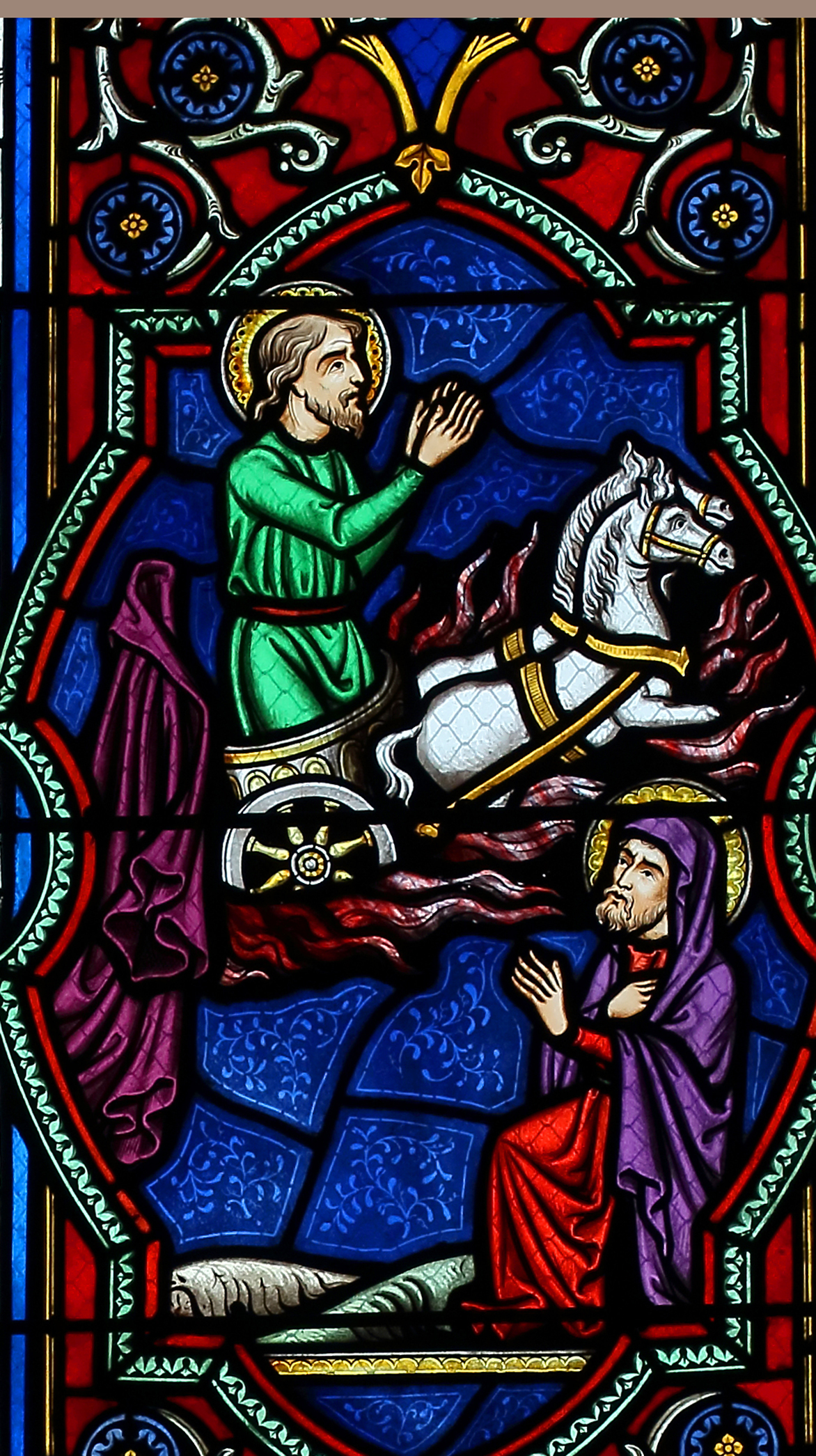

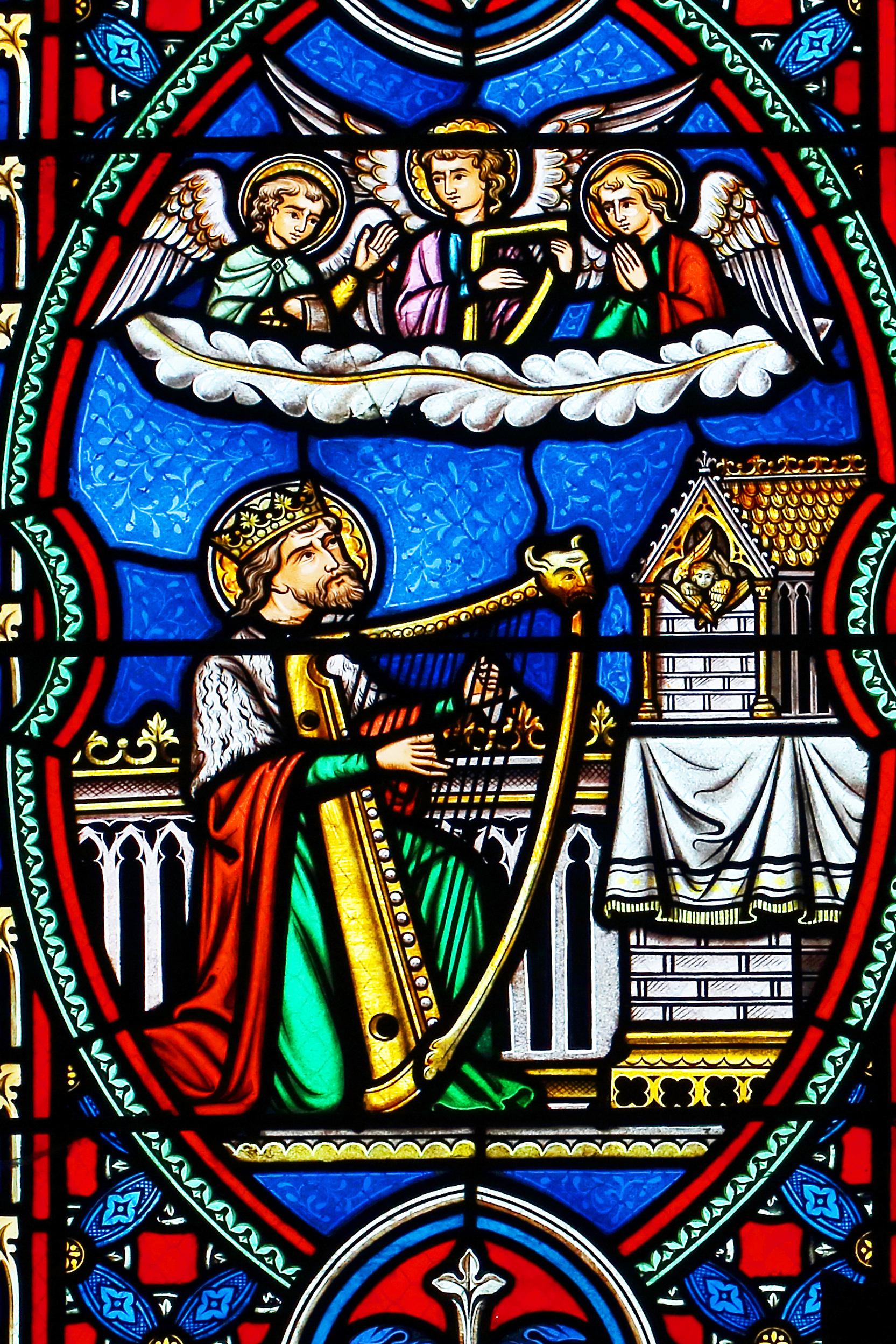

=== Stained Glass Windows (19th-century) ===
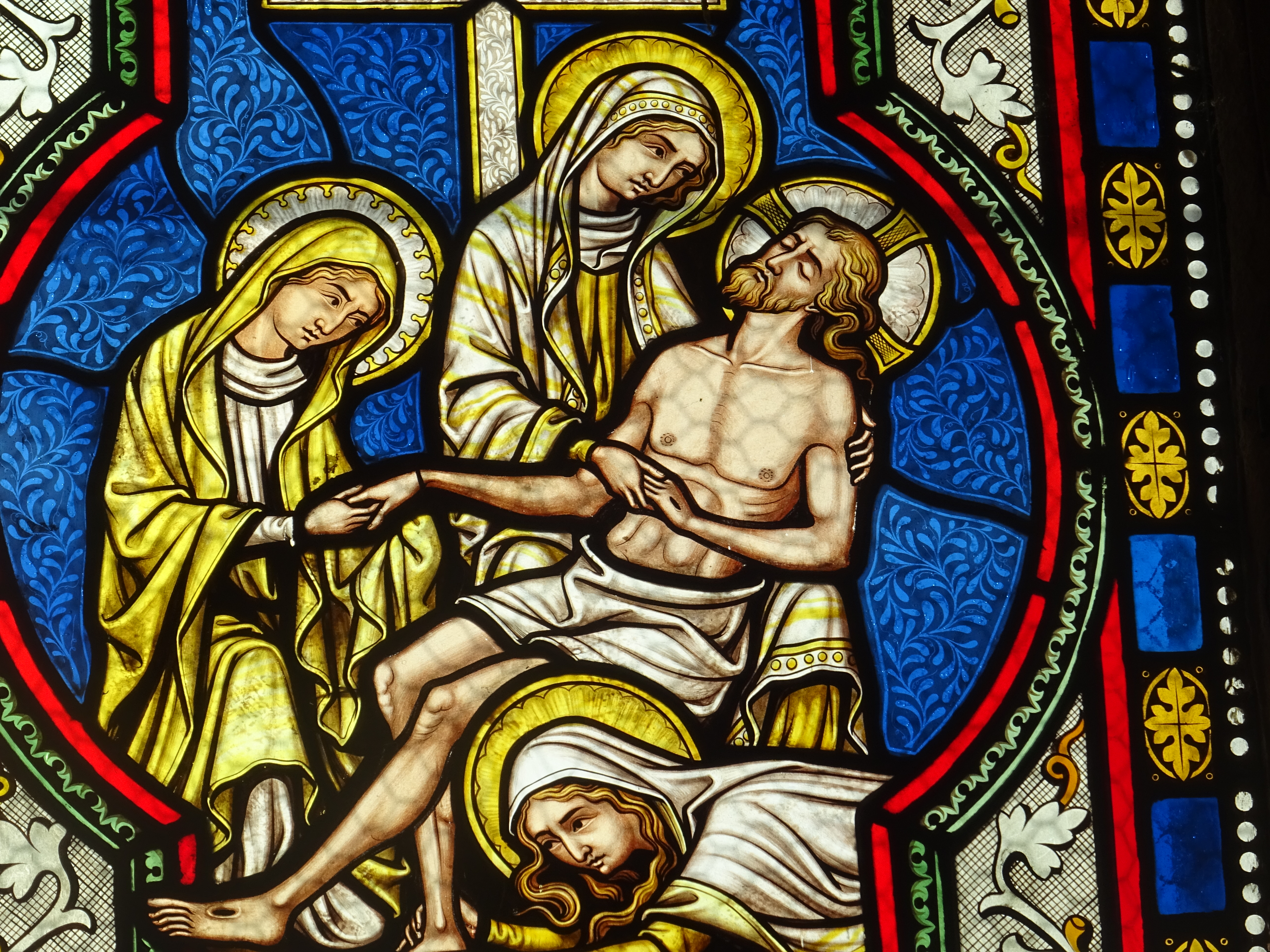

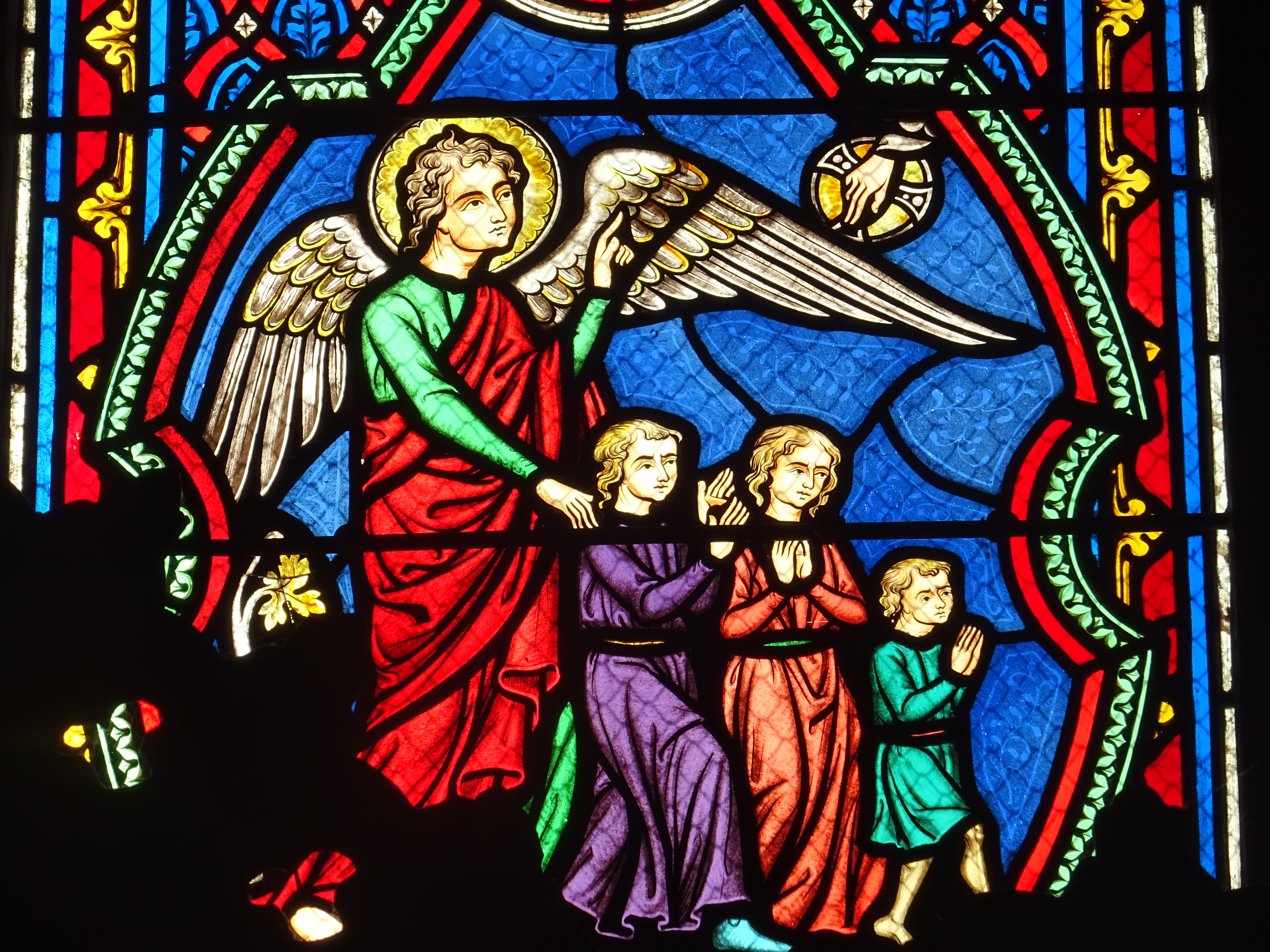

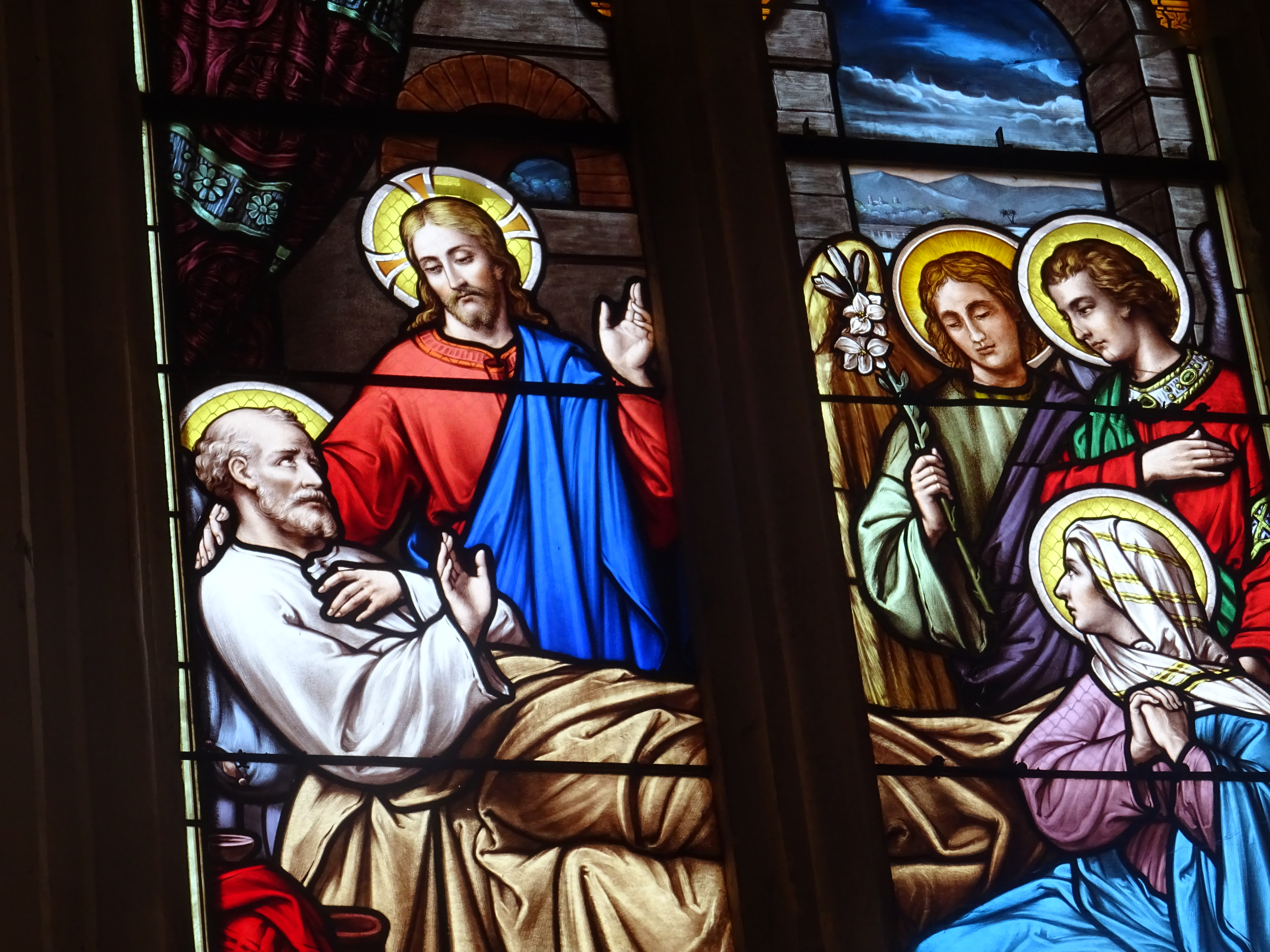

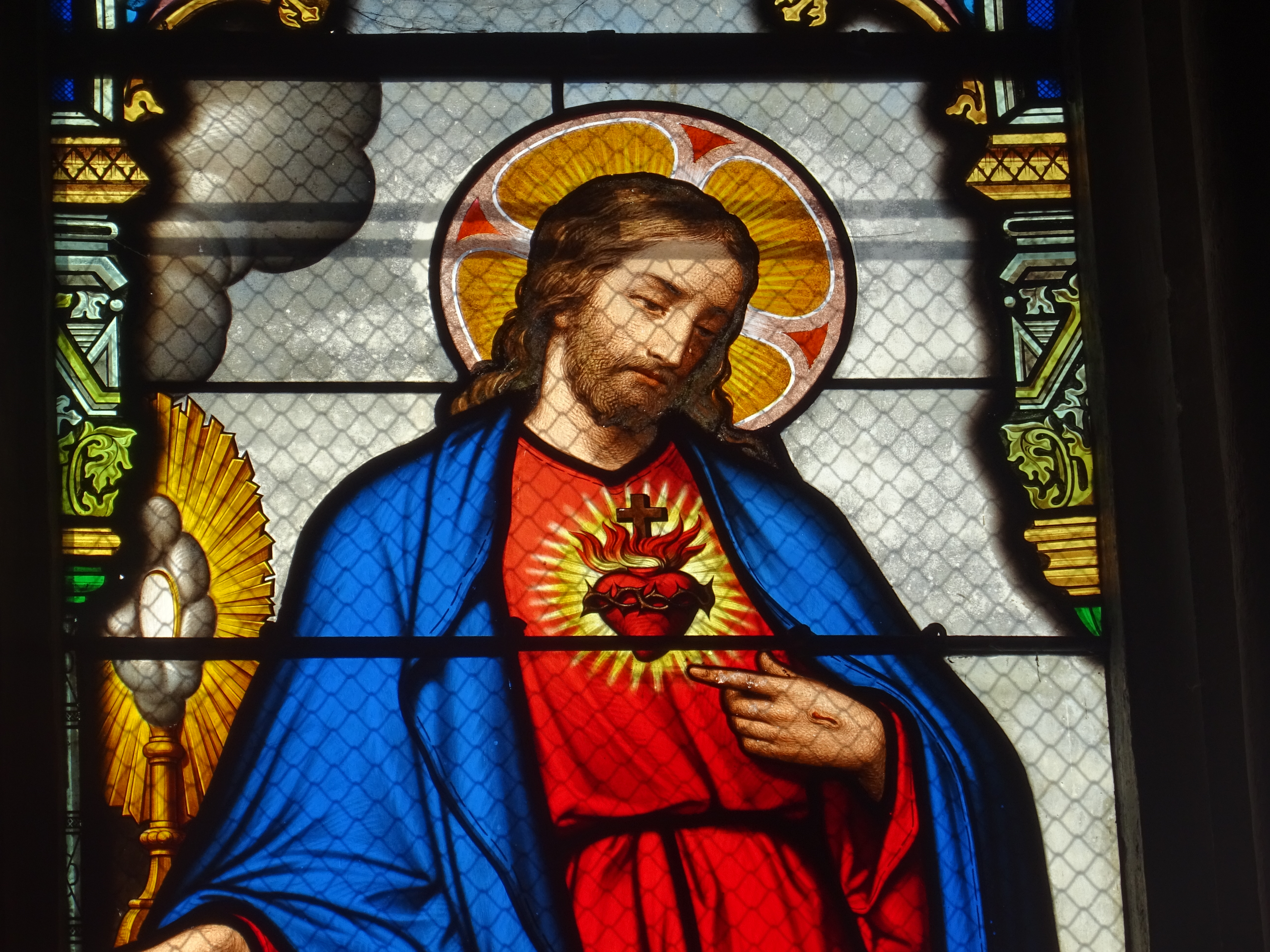

== See also ==
- List of basilicas in France
