= Catholic devotions =

Catholic traditions

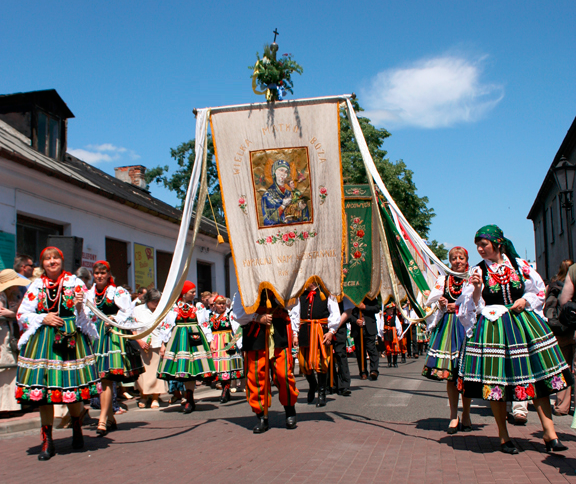
The Corpus Christi procession in Łowicz

Catholic devotions are particular customs, rituals, and practices of worship of God or honour of the saints which are in addition to the liturgy of the Catholic Church, described as "expressions of love and fidelity that arise from the intersection of one's own faith, culture and the Gospel of Jesus Christ". Devotions are not considered part of liturgical worship, even if they are performed in a church or led by a priest, but rather they are paraliturgical. The Congregation for Divine Worship at the Vatican publishes a Directory on Popular Piety and the Liturgy.

Catholic devotions have various forms, ranging from formalized, multi-day prayers such as novenas to activities, such as processions or the Eucharistic adoration, the wearing of scapulars, the veneration of the saints, the Canonical coronations of sacred Marian or Christological images and even horticultural practices such as maintaining a Mary garden.

Common examples of Catholic devotions are the Way of the Cross, the Rosary, the Angelus and various litanies, devotions to the Blessed Sacrament, the Sacred Heart, the Immaculate Heart of Mary and the Holy Face of Jesus, pilgrimages, observing the month of the Rosary in October and the month of Mary in May.

== Background ==
In Catholic tradition, a wide range of practices have developed, ranging from devotions to the Holy Trinity to specific saints. The three-level hierarchy of latria, hyperdulia and dulia determines the appropriate type of worship or veneration for different situations. Latria (from the Greek λατρεία, latreia) is used for worship, adoration and reverence directed only to the Holy Trinity. Dulia (from the Greek δουλεία, douleia) is the kind of honor given to the communion of saints, while the Blessed Virgin Mary is honored with hyperdulia, a higher form of dulia but lower than latria.

Since the Middle Ages, popes have encouraged devotions such as Eucharistic adoration, the Rosary and the Stations of the Cross, while maintaining the primacy of liturgy over private devotions. Pious devotions have influenced some important parts of the Catholic calendar such as the feast of Corpus Christi or various Marian feasts that gradually appeared with the growth of devotions. Catholic devotions can form the basis of major community events, such as the statue of Our Lady of Zapopan, which attracts over one million pilgrims on October 12 each year as the statue travels through the streets moving from one cathedral to another.

While the Catholic Church considers its formal liturgy to be central to the life and mission of the church, it acknowledges the role of popular devotions, stating in the Second Vatican Council's Constitution on the Sacred Liturgy (Sacrosanctum Concilium) that the church's spiritual life "is not limited solely to participation in the liturgy":

Popular devotions of the Christian people are to be highly commended, provided they accord with the laws and norms of the Church, above all when they are ordered by the Apostolic See. Devotions proper to individual Churches also have a special dignity if they are undertaken by mandate of the bishops according to customs or books lawfully approved. But these devotions should be so drawn up that they harmonize with the liturgical seasons, accord with the sacred liturgy, are in some fashion derived from it, and lead the people to it, since, in fact, the liturgy by its very nature far surpasses any of them.

Several factors shape the efficacy of devotional practices in eliciting feelings of devotion: a strong emotional appeal, a simplicity of form which puts them within the reach of all, the association with many others engaged in the same practices, and their derivation from the example of others considered to lead a holy life.

Various unapproved acts such as the promotion of chain letters that contain prayers or the belief that the use of a statue of Saint Joseph can speed up the sale of a house have been discouraged as non-pious, superstitious and against Catholic values. In general, acts and beliefs that aim at the manipulation of divine power for specific gainful purposes are always condemned as contrary to Catholic devotional practices.

== Novenas ==
A novena is a nine-day period of private or public prayer to obtain a special grace, for a specific intention, or in preparation for a feast. It is often prayed to ask for God's help through the intercession of a saint.

The practice of novenas traditionally derives from the nine days spent in prayer by the Apostles and Disciples together with Mary from the Ascension until the Descent of the Holy Spirit on Pentecost. This is considered to have been the first novena. Early Christians observed a nine-day mourning period following the death of a loved one. Later, that tradition would be followed by a Mass offered for the repose of the soul. This practice continues today, as an example in the form of the novemdiales, observed upon the death of a Pope. In the Middle Ages, especially in Spain and France, novenas were prayed before Christmas to symbolize Christ’s nine months in the womb, later evolving into devotions for feast preparation or seeking a saint’s intercession.

The Pentecost Novena to the Holy Spirit is traditionally prayed especially during the nine days between the Ascension Thursday and Pentecost. It is generally prayed for an increase of the Seven gifts of the Holy Spirit.

The Novena to the Holy Trinity generally includes the Gloria Patri, although the other prayers may be used.

Another pious practice is St. Andrew's Christmas Novena. It is not prayed to Saint Andrew, but commences on his feast day, November 30 and continues until Christmas.

== Devotions to Jesus Christ ==
=== Eucharistic adoration ===
Several widespread devotions in the Catholic tradition relate to Jesus Christ. Catholic teaching considers the Eucharistic adoration an important practice which "stimulates the faithful to an awareness of the marvelous presence of Christ and is an invitation to spiritual communion with Him." Often the Eucharistic adoration is performed for at least a full hour known as the Holy Hour by some groups or individuals even daily. The inspiration for the Holy Hour is Matthew 26:40 when in the Garden of Gethsemane the night before his crucifixion, Jesus asks Peter: "So, could you men not keep watch with me for one hour?".

=== Sacred Heart of Jesus ===
Some devotions have the form of Acts of Reparation to Jesus Christ. Devotions to the Sacred Heart of Jesus first appeared in the eleventh and twelfth centuries, but most current devotions are attributed to Margaret Mary Alacoque (1647–1690) and were later encouraged by Pope Pius XI in his encyclical Miserentissimus Redemptor. These current devotions include the Feast of the Sacred Heart, the First Fridays devotion, the Act of Consecration to the Sacred Heart, the image of the Sacred Heart and the Holy Hour, which also originated from Alacoque's revelations.

=== Holy Face of Jesus ===
The devotion to the Holy Face of Jesus dates back to Mary of Saint Peter in 1843 who reported visions of Jesus and Mary in which she was urged to spread both the devotion to the Holy Face and that of the Holy Name of Jesus in reparation for the many insults Jesus suffered in his Passion, resulting in The Golden Arrow prayer. The devotion was first approved by Pope Leo XIII in 1885, and further promoted by Maria Pierina de Micheli based on the image from Secondo Pia's photograph of the Shroud of Turin. In 1958, Pope Pius XII approved of the devotion and the Holy Face medal and granted that the Feast of the Holy Face of Jesus may be celebrated on Shrove Tuesday throughout the Catholic Church.

=== Divine Mercy ===
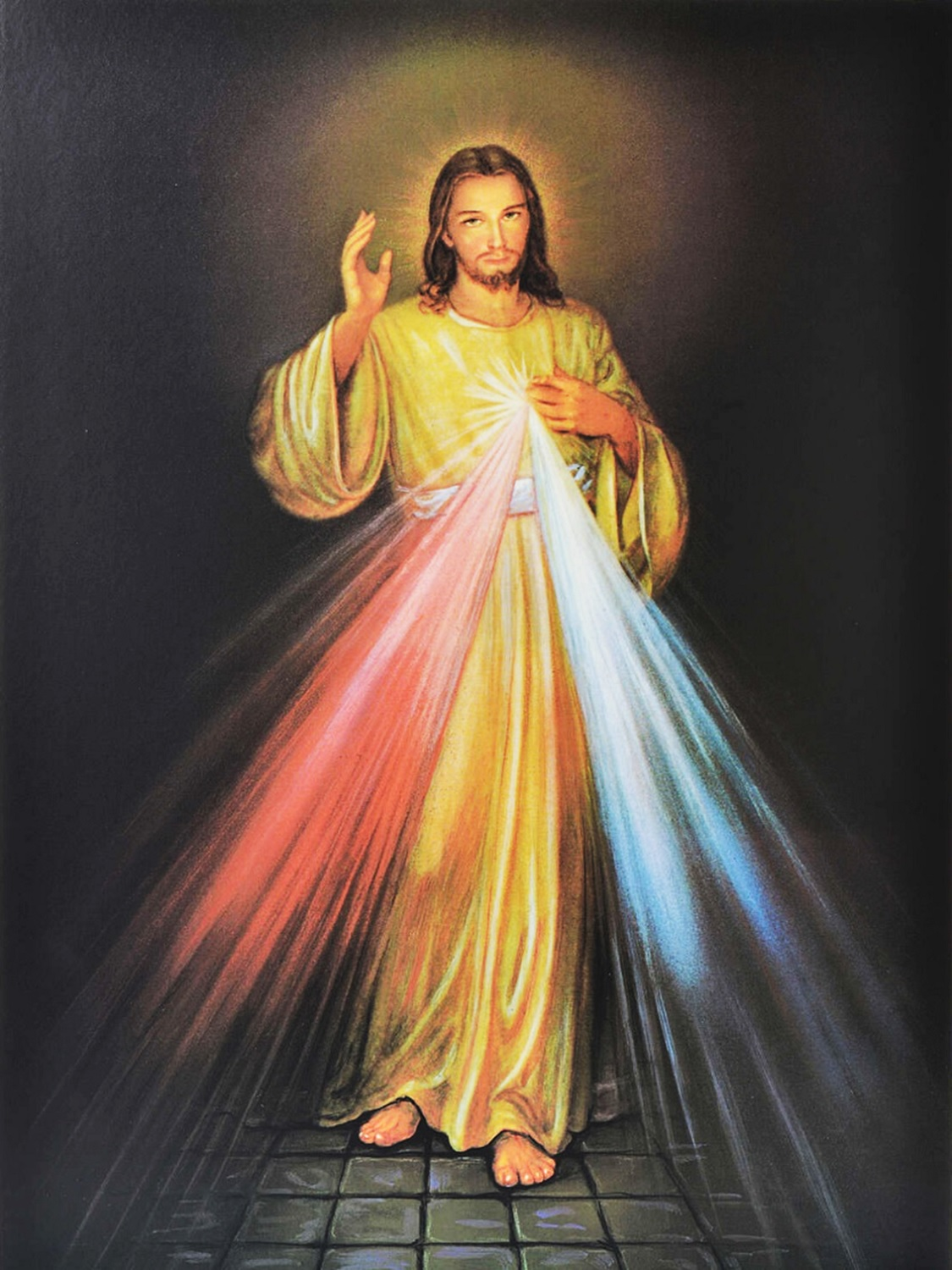
Merciful Jesus

The Divine Mercy devotion is based on the visions and revelations of Jesus Christ received by Saint Faustina Kowalska, which she recorded in her personal Diary. She said she was given the mission to spread this devotion throughout the world. It seeks to proclaim and implore God’s mercy for all humanity through the merits of Christ’s Passion and the piercing of his Sacred Heart. Her writings led to the establishment of several forms of devotion to Divine Mercy, including the Divine Mercy Sunday, the Chaplet of the Divine Mercy and the Divine Mercy image, the Divine Mercy Novena, and the Hour of Mercy.

=== Other devotions ===
The First Thursdays Devotion based on the visions of Alexandrina of Balazar, and the Chaplet of the Holy Wounds revealed to Marie Martha Chambon.

== Prayers ==
Angelus, Jean-François Millet

The Angelus is a traditional prayer used to commemorate the Incarnation. It consists essentially in the triple repetition of the Hail Mary, to which in later times have been added three introductory versicles and a concluding versicle and prayer. The prayer is that which belongs to the antiphon of Our Lady, "Alma Redemptoris". It is prayed three times daily: at dawn, mid-day and at dusk. The manner of ringing the Angelus—the triple stroke repeated three times, with a pause between each set of three (a total of nine strokes), sometimes followed by a longer peal as at curfew—seems to have been long established. During Eastertide, the Angelus is replaced with the Regina Coeli an antiphon, dating from the tenth or eleventh century.

The Rosary, or Psalter of the Blessed Virgin Mary, is essentially a contemplative prayer. Family recitation of the rosary is encouraged. In the encyclical Ingruentium malorum, Pope Pius XII said regarding the custom of the family recitation of the Holy Rosary:

"...when, at eventide, the Christian home resounds with the frequent repetition of praises in honor of the High Queen of Heaven...Then the Rosary, recited in the family,...unites them piously with those absent and those dead. It links all more tightly in a sweet bond of love, with the most Holy Virgin, who, like a loving mother, in the circle of her children, will be there bestowing upon them an abundance of the gifts of concord and family peace."

The Litany of Loreto is the most well-known Marian litany.

== Devotions to saints ==
Through their prayers of intercession, the saints in heaven play an integral role in the life of the church on earth. "To honor the Saints is automatically to honor God, the Author of their sanctity." The Catechism of the Catholic Church (item 957) states:

It is not merely by the title of example that we cherish the memory of those in heaven; we seek, rather, that by this devotion to the exercise of fraternal charity the union of the whole Church in the Spirit may be strengthened. Exactly as Christian communion among our fellow pilgrims brings us closer to Christ, so our communion with the saints joins us to Christ.

=== Devotions to the Virgin Mary ===
==== The month of May ====
Many devotions and pious exercises are in some way related to the liturgical feasts of the General Calendar of the Roman Rite or of the particular calendars of dioceses and religious congregations. Dedication of the month of May to the Blessed Virgin Mary dates from about the seventeenth century. Pious practices include the erection of a small "May altar" decorated with May flowers, a custom that stems from southern European countries. Parishes and private groups often crown an image of the Blessed Virgin Mary with flowers. This is referred to as a “May crowning.” This rite may be done on solemnities and feasts of the Blessed Virgin Mary, or other festive days, and offers an opportunity to reflect on Mary's role in the history of salvation. In some countries, it takes place on or about May 1, however, in many North American Catholic parishes, it frequently takes place on Mother's Day, March 7th.

==== Immaculate Heart of Mary ====
Devotions to the Immaculate Heart of Mary date back to Bernard of Clairvaux, and was further developed and popularized by figures such as John Eudes and Louis de Montfort.

In 1830, the reported Marian apparitions to Catherine Labouré, played a significant role in promoting the devotion, particularly through the introduction of the Miraculous Medal, which features the thorn-crowned Sacred Heart of Jesus and the pierced Immaculate Heart of Mary. Many parishes hold a novena each Monday to Our Lady of the Miraculous Medal.

During the Marian apparition of 13 July 1917, at Fátima, the Virgin Mary is said to have requested the consecration of Russia to her Immaculate Heart, and the practice of the First Saturdays Devotion as reparation for sins committed against her Heart. According to Lucia dos Santos, one of the Portuguese visionaries, these requests were later reiterated during further Marian apparitions, notably during the Pontevedra apparitions in 1925 and 1926. These reported apparitions contributed to the establishment of these particular devotions, and also personal consecrations to the Immaculate Heart of Mary.

==== Saturdays ====
Saturdays are dedicated to the Virgin Mary, designated as memorials of the Blessed Virgin Mary. This practice dates from Carolingian times (ninth century).

A Medieval devotion celebrated the three Golden Saturdays which followed the Feast of St. Michael (September 29). The golden Saturdays were observed with reception of the sacraments and festivities, especially at pilgrimage sites.

The practice of Reparation to the Immaculate Heart of Mary on the First Saturday was initiated in Rovigo, Italy by Mary Inglese, a Servite tertiary in 1889. It gained widespread diffusion after the Marian apparitions at Fátima in 1917, and the Pontevedra apparitions in 1925 and 1926, where the Virgin Mary reportedly requested this devotion as part of her message. The practice developed into the currently known devotion of the Five First Saturdays.

==== Other Marian devotions ====
Specific episodes in the Life of the Virgin Mary have resulted in devotions that focus on a particular aspect of her life. Examples include the Seven Sorrows of Mary that recall her sufferings from the Prophecy of Simeon to the Crucifixion of Jesus.

The Seven Joys of Mary on the other hand start with the Annunciation and end with her coronation in Heaven.

Among devotional articles, probably the most common are the scapular of Our Lady of Mount Carmel, and the Miraculous Medal, which dates to 1830. Also Scapular of Our Lady of Good Counsel and the Scapular of the Seven Dolours of Mary

Regional devotions continue to generate local support such as festivals and celebrations. The festival of Our Lady of Solitude of Porta Vaga in the Philippines has been celebrated for centuries, and its icon continues to be venerated. Each year around Pentecost, as part of a local Marian devotion, about a million people attend the Romería de El Rocío in Spain. In Los Angeles, California, an old custom of a Marian procession was revived in 2011 to coincide with the anniversary of the founding of the city. Various chivalric, fraternal, and religious orders, parishes, and other religious and civic organizations participate.

=== Other devotions ===
Traditions vary across different cultures. Italians, for example, have a strong devotion to Anthony of Padua. The Tredicina refers to a thirteen-day Novena that takes places in preparation for the Feast of Saint Anthony on June 13.

There are a number of devotional practices in honor of Saint Joseph; these include the Prayer to Saint Joseph and the Novena to Saint Joseph. Saint Joseph's scapular was approved by Pope Leo XIII in 1893. Saint Joseph's Medal is a sacramental introduced in 1971 to celebrate the 100th anniversary of Saint Joseph being declared the patron of the Catholic Church. A number of local devotions and customs to Saint Joseph exist around the world, e.g. Alpine regions, Josephstragen (German for carrying Saint Joseph) takes place on the 9 days before Christmas. A statue of Saint Joseph is carried between 9 homes, and on the first day one boy prays to him, on the second day two boys pray, until 9 boys pray the 9th day. The statue is then placed near a manger in the town church on Christmas Eve. Further devotions are the seven joys and seven sorrows of Saint Joseph, analogous to the seven joys and seven sorrows of the Virgin, and private devotions such as that to the most Chaste Heart of Joseph.

Devotions to the archangel Saint Michael involve specific prayers and Novenas to Saint Michael, hymns such as Te Splendor as well as the Scapular of Saint Michael the Archangel and the Chaplet of Saint Michael. The Prayer to Saint Michael is also a popular prayer, composed by Pope Leo XIII.

Devotions to Saint George are also widely practiced by Catholics, given that he is one of the most popular saints in Christianity. These devotions and churches built in his honor date to the 6th century.

Many other devotions to saints exist, such as the Novena of Grace addressed to Francis Xavier and the Cord of Saint Francis associated with Francis of Assisi.

== See also ==
- Alliance of the Hearts of Jesus and Mary
- Consecration and entrustment to Mary
- Popular piety
- Rosary devotions and spirituality
- Saint George in devotions, traditions and prayers

== Sources ==
- Ball, Ann (2003). Encyclopedia of Catholic Devotions and Practices. Our Sunday Visitor. ISBN 0-87973-910-X.
- Binz, Stephen J. (2006). Sacred Heart of Jesus. Twenty-Third Publications. ISBN 1-58595-597-3.
- Carroll, Michael (2007). The Alliance of the Hearts of Jesus and Mary: Hope for the World. Queenship Publishing. ISBN 978-1-882972-98-2.
- Forster, Mark (2001). Catholic Revival in the Age of the Baroque. Cambridge Univ Press. ISBN 0-521-78044-6.
- Murphy, John F. (2007). Mary's Immaculate Heart. Read Books. ISBN 978-1-4067-3409-6.
- Stravinskas, Peter (1998). Our Sunday Visitor's Catholic Encyclopedia. OSV Press. ISBN 0-87973-669-0.
- White, James F. (2003). Roman Catholic worship: Trent to today. Liturgical Press. ISBN 0-8146-6194-7.
