= Saint Augustine Altarpiece =

Saint Augustine Altarpiece is the name of the following paintings:

- Saint Augustine Altarpiece (Huguet), a 1460 egg tempera painting by Jaume Huguet
- Saint Augustine Altarpiece (Piero della Francesca), a 1454–1469 mixed-technique painting by Piero della Francesca
