= Silent preaching =

Term in Catholic art

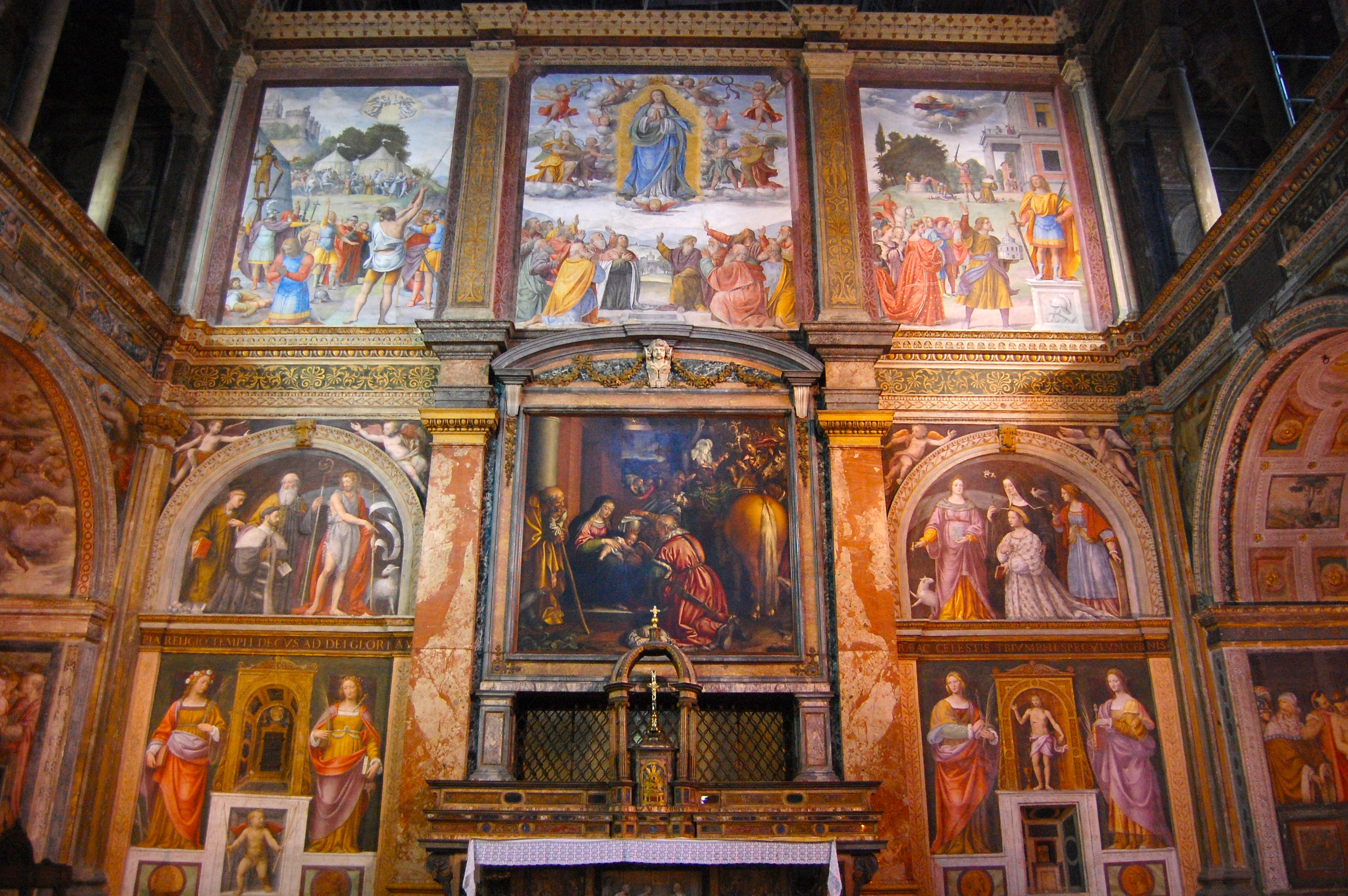
16th-century frescoes by Bernardino Luini at the church of San Maurizio al Monastero Maggiore, Milan.

Silent preaching (Latin: muta predicatio; Italian: muta predicazione) is a term used in Catholic Art to describe the use of religious images as a method of conveying devotional messages, teachings and religious concepts, beginning around the Renaissance in Italy.

== Description ==
The Discourse on Sacred and Profane Images (also simply called the Discorso) written by Gabriele Paleotti, the 16th-century Archbishop of Bologna is also known as the "Catechism of Images" for it established key concepts for the use of images as a form of religious instruction and indoctrination, following the Council of Trent in which he was a participant. Paleotti's approach was much more artistic than the approach proposed by his contemporary and Trent participant Charles Borromeo in his "Instructions on Ecclesiastical Buildings" but Borromeo (who had considerable power) approved of Paleotti's methods and implemented them. While Borromeo's "Instructions" did include a chapter called "On Sacred Images and Pictures", his focus was mostly on architectural and design elements, rather than art. However, Paleotti's focus was "the transformation of Christian life through vision".

Paleotti had great respect for his contemporary Filippo Neri and his style of oration and considered the use of "ordinary language" for preaching (sermo humilis) as essential for reaching the masses. Paleotti also argued that dogmatic teachings, however precise, could not reach the heart of the public as easily as the visual arts and hence could not produce real change in the Church unless accompanied by art. Paleotti believed in the "nonverbal rules of language" that are deeply rooted in the human spirit and considered religious art as the key to the communication of devotions as well as doctrines.

The use of religious "picture text" was growing in Europe within the same period and Rosary meditation using narrative images gained so much popularity that at the end of the 16th century the most widely used rosary meditation in Germany was not a written one, but a picture text.

The use of muta predicatio continued well into the Baroque period where paintings came to be seen as imagistic writing and a form of visual language for instruction. Visual art thus came to act as the "literature of the layman" via the concept of pictura-litteratura illiterata, i.e. pictures are the literature of the illiterate.

Art historian Pamela J. Huckins has argued that the Franciscan missions of Alta California into the 19th century also employed muta predicatio to use art to transcend the barriers of language and literacy. She suggests that specific images were employed in this period to instruct indigenous mission congregations about Christianity, as well as European culture, and to help the audience recall and relate to what was said during specific sermons.

== See also ==
- Poor Man's Bible

== Bibliography ==
- Gabriele Paleotti, Discorso intorno alle imagini sacre et profane ("Discourse on Sacred and Profane Images") (Bologna: Alessandro Benacci, 1582; reprint Bologna: Arnaldo Forni, 1990)
- Saint Charles Borromeo, George J. Wigley St. Charles Borromeo's instructions on ecclesiastical building, C. Dolman, 1857
