= Novena of Grace =

Catholic devotion in honor of Saint Francis Xavier

The Novena of Grace is a Catholic devotion in honor of Saint Francis Xavier. It is usually performed from March 4 to March 12.

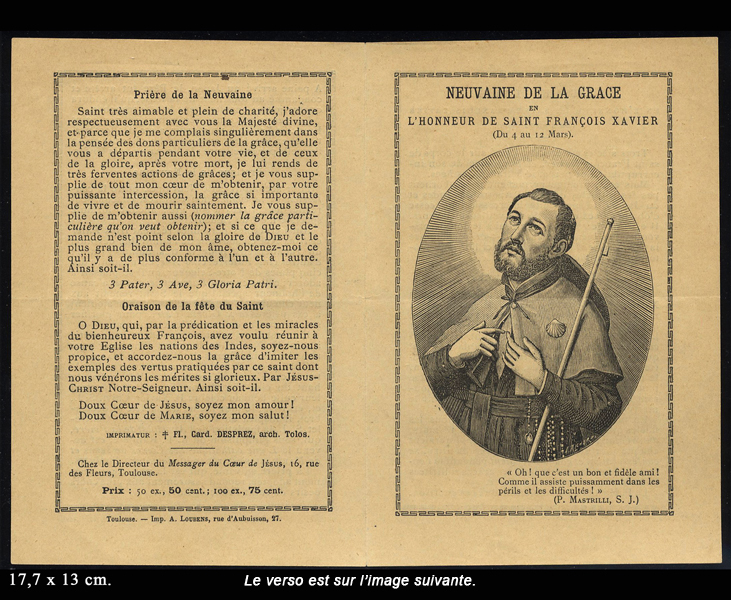
Novena of Grace in French

== History ==
In Naples in 1633, Fr. Marcello Mastrilli, S.J. took a vow asking to be assigned Japan during a period of violent suppression of Christians.

While waiting for the passage to Japan, Mastrilli organized the feast of the Immaculate Conception in the College of Naples. The feast was a success which helped to bring home to the faithful the great privilege of Our Lady, which then was not yet defined as a dogma of the faith.

As Fr. Mastrilli supervised the removal of the temporary structure, a hammer slipped from the hands of a worker and fell on his head. He sustained a severe injury and was on the verge of death. A vision of St. Francis Xavier appeared to Fr. Mastrilli asking him to renew his vow to go to Japan:

"All those who implore my help daily for nine consecutive days, from the fourth to the twelfth of March inclusive and worthily receive the Sacraments of Penance and Holy Communion on one of the nine days will experience my protection and may hope with entire assurance to obtain from God any Grace they ask that is for the good of their souls and the glory of God."

Afterwards, Fr. Mastrilli arose entirely cured. Faithful to his vow, he led a group of thirty-three Jesuits to Japan. When they arrived, Fr. Mastrilli was immediately arrested, tried and condemned. He was executed on October 17, 1637 and died a martyr.

Before leaving for Japan, Fr. Mastrilli widely published the news of his cure and vision. Thus the devotion spread far and wide.

Another tradition states that the first Novena of Grace took place in 1615 in Goa, India when a boy who was crippled from birth was cured.

== Text ==
Below is a standard version of the Novena prayer, customarily followed by a Preces and Collect, as well as basic prayers.

"Most amiable and most loving Saint Francis Xavier, in union with thee I reverently adore the Divine Majesty. I rejoice exceedingly on account of the marvelous gifts which God bestowed upon thee. I thank God for the special graces He gave thee during thy life on earth and for the great glory that came to thee after thy death. I implore thee to obtain for me, through thy powerful intercession, the greatest of all blessings - that of living and dying in the state of grace. I also beg of thee to secure for me the special favor I ask in this novena. (Here state the grace, spiritual or temporal, you wish to obtain.) In asking this favor, I am fully resigned to the Divine Will. I pray and desire only to obtain that which is most conducive to the greater glory of God and the greater good of my soul."

℣. Pray for us, Saint Francis Xavier.
℟. That we may be made worthy of the promises of Christ.

O God, Who didst vouchsafe, by the preaching and miracles of Saint Francis Xavier, to join unto Thy Church the nations of the Indies; grant, we beseech Thee, that we who reverence his glorious merits may also imitate his example.
Through Jesus Christ Our Lord. Amen.

In memory of Saint Francis Xavier's devotion to the Trinity:
3 Our Fathers
3 Hail Marys

In thanksgiving for the graces in his ten-year ministry:
10 Glory Bes

== Conditions ==
The novena will normally include a visit to a Jesuit church or chapel.

The novena ends on 12 March which is the date of the canonisation of St Francis Xavier and St Ignatius.

The novena can also be held from 25 November to 3 December (St Francis Xavier’s feast day). However, it can be carried out at any time of the year.

== See also ==
- Novena

== Sources ==
- Frs. P. de Mattei, S.J. & F.X. Rocca, S.J., Novena of Grace To St. Francis Xavier, Catholic Book Crusade, Patna, 1944. No copyright mentioned. Imprimatur: Leo Proserpio, S.J., Episc. Calicutensis, Calicut, April 15, 1944.
