= Antonio Maria Vassallo =

Italian painter

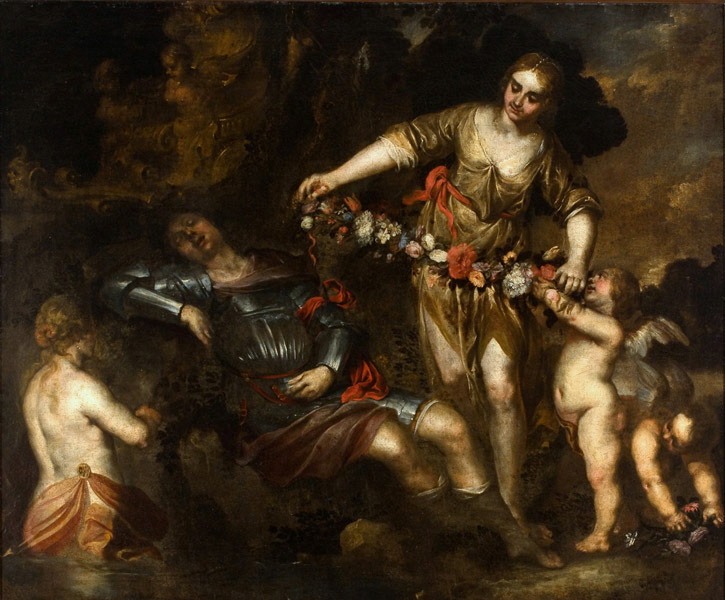
Rinald and Armida (ca. 1635) by Antonio Maria Vassallo. Museu Nacional de Belas Artes, Rio de Janeiro.

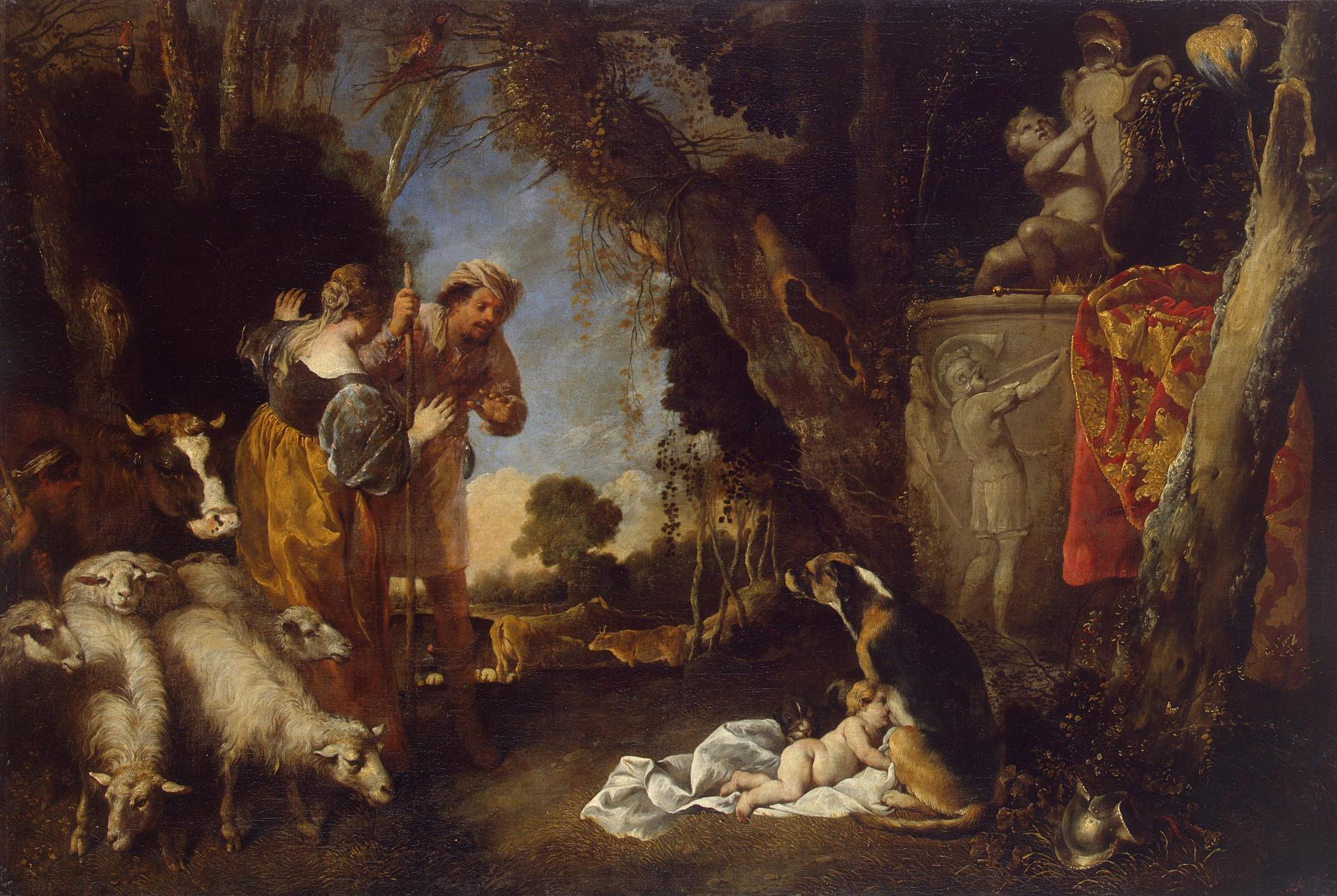
Childhood of King Cyrus

Antonio Maria Vassallo (c. 1620–1664/1673) was an Italian painter of the Baroque period, active mainly in Genoa, and painting mythologic scenes and still lifes.

His biography is poorly documented, and mainly depends on the Genoese biographer Raffaele Soprani (1674) as a source. He initially apprenticed with Vincenzo Malò (c. 1605–c. 1650), a Flemish artist who had studied with Teniers the Elder and Rubens. Vassallo appears to have been influenced by his fellow Genoese Sinibaldo Scorza and Giovanni Benedetto Castiglione.

He painted a St. Francis with Three female saints (1648) for the church of San Gerolamo in Quarto. Vassallo also painted a Martyrdom of Saint Marcello Mastrilli' (1664) for the Convento di Carignano. Vassallo is known to have painted portraits, yet no portraits by Vassallo are known to survive.

The closest follower of Vassallo's still-life style is Giovanni Agostino Cassana (c. 1658–1720).
