= Novena to Saint Joseph =

Catholic Novena

The Novena to Saint Joseph is a Roman Catholic Novena prayed to Saint Joseph.

== Novena ==
The Novena to Saint Joseph, like all other Novenas, is prayed on nine consecutive days with a specific intention. There are multiple forms of this Novena and in 1876 Pope Pius IX granted indulgences, with the usual indulgence conditions, to all those who with a contrite heart pray the Novena at any time during the year based on a prayer approved by the Church.

The Memorare to Saint Joseph is one prayer that can be used for the Novena:

Remember, O most pure spouse of the Blessed Virgin Mary,
my sweet protector St. Joseph
that no one ever had recourse to thy protection
or implored thy aid without obtaining relief.

Confiding therefore in thy goodness,
I come before thee, and humbly supplicate thee.

Oh, despise not my petitions,
foster-father of the Redeemer,
but graciously receive them.
Amen.

== See also ==
- Prayer to Saint Joseph
