= Te Splendor =

Archangel Michael by Jaime Huguet, 1456.

"Te Splendor" is a Roman Catholic hymn dedicated to Saint Michael, the Archangel. The hymn derives its name from the fact that in Latin it begins with the words: Te splendor et virtus Patris. The hymn is found in the Roman Breviary.

== History ==
"Te splendor et virtus Patris" is based on the hymn "Tibi, Christe, splendor Patris" attributed to Rabanus Maurus, which was revised in 1632 by Pope Urban VIII. Many churches and religious orders continued to use the original version.

In the Roman Breviary, "Te Splendor" is traditionally sung at Vespers and Matins on the Feast of St. Michael the Archangel (September 29), which also commemorates the Dedication of the Basilica of St. Michael the Archangel and all the Angels on Mount Gargano. (The apparition of St. Michael at Gargano is observed on May 8.)

In 1817 Pope Pius VII granted an indulgence of 200 days once a day for saying the hymn (including antiphon and prayer) with a contrite heart and devotion, in honor of St. Michael the Archangel in order to obtain his patronage and protection against the assaults of the enemy of man. The hymn is included in the Raccolta collection of prayers, and its authorized translations.

== Versions ==
Tomás Luis de Victoria composed an arrangement of "Tibi Christe splendor patris". Palestrina arranged it as a hymn for four voices; Luca Marenzio set it as a motet. "Te Splendor et virtus Patris" forms a part of Marcel Dupré's "Le Tombeau de Titelouze" for organ.

English Catholic priest Frederick Charles Husenbeth did an English translation from the Latin, as did Anglican priest and hymnwriter John Mason Neale in his 1867 Mediæval Hymns and Sequences. Catholic Oratorian Edward Caswall's, translation is rendered as "O Jesu! Life-Spring of the Soul".

== Hymn ==
English text of the hymn is as follows:

O Jesus, lifespring of the soul,
The Father's power, and glory bright!
Thee with the angels we extol;
From Thee they draw their life and light.

Thy thousand thousand hosts are spread
Embattled o‘er the azure sky;
But Michael bears Thy standard dread,
And lifts the mighty Cross on high.

He in that sign the rebel powers
Did with their dragon prince expel;
And hurl'd them from the heaven's high towers
Down like a thunderbolt to hell.

Grant us with Michael still, O Lord,
Against the Prince of Pride to fight;
So may a crown be our reward,
Before the Lamb's pure throne of light.

To God the Father glory be,
And to his sole-begotten Son;
The same, O Holy Ghost, to Thee,
While everlasting ages run.

Ant. Most glorious Prince, Michael the Archangel, be thou mindful of us; here, and in all places, pray for us to the Son of God most high.

V. I wilt sing praises to Thee, my God, before the Angels.
R. I will adore Thee in Thy holy temple, and praise Thy Name.

Let us pray.
O God, who in the dispensation of Thy providence dost admirably dispose the ministry of angels and of men; mercifully grant that the Holy Angels, who ever minister before Thy throne in heaven, may be the protectors also of our life on earth. Through Jesus Christ our Lord.

== Sources ==
- The Raccolta Collection of indulgenced prayers by T. Galli, authorized translation by Ambrose Saint John, Published by Burns and Lambert, London, 1857, page 252.
