= Chaste Heart of Joseph =

Roman Catholic devotion

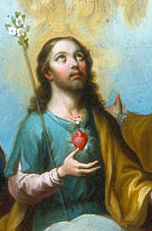
Saint Joseph depicted with his Most Chaste Heart

The Most Chaste Heart of Joseph (Latin: Cor Iosephi Purissimum) is a Catholic devotion which venerates Saint Joseph as "the just man … a man of singular virtue. This strength of character, this reign of virtue, extended to all aspects of his life and his person, including his heart." Saint Joseph is traditionally seen as the chaste guardian both of the Blessed Virgin Mary and of all virgins, the foster-father of the Son of God. The devotion particularly highlights Joseph's virtuous role, he is also considered as a father of orphans and protector of widows. It encompasses Joseph's devotion and love of the Holy Trinity, including a profound love for his son Jesus Christ, for the Virgin Mary and for all mankind. It especially emphasizes his love for Mary in a chaste and virginal way. The Chaste Heart of Joseph is depicted as inflamed with love and adorned with a white lily representing purity.

Unlike the devotions to the Most Sacred Heart of Jesus and the Immaculate Heart of Mary there is no liturgical cultus of the Chaste Heart of Joseph, and it is therefore reserved to being a private devotion.
