= Marcello Mastrilli =

Italian Jesuit missionary

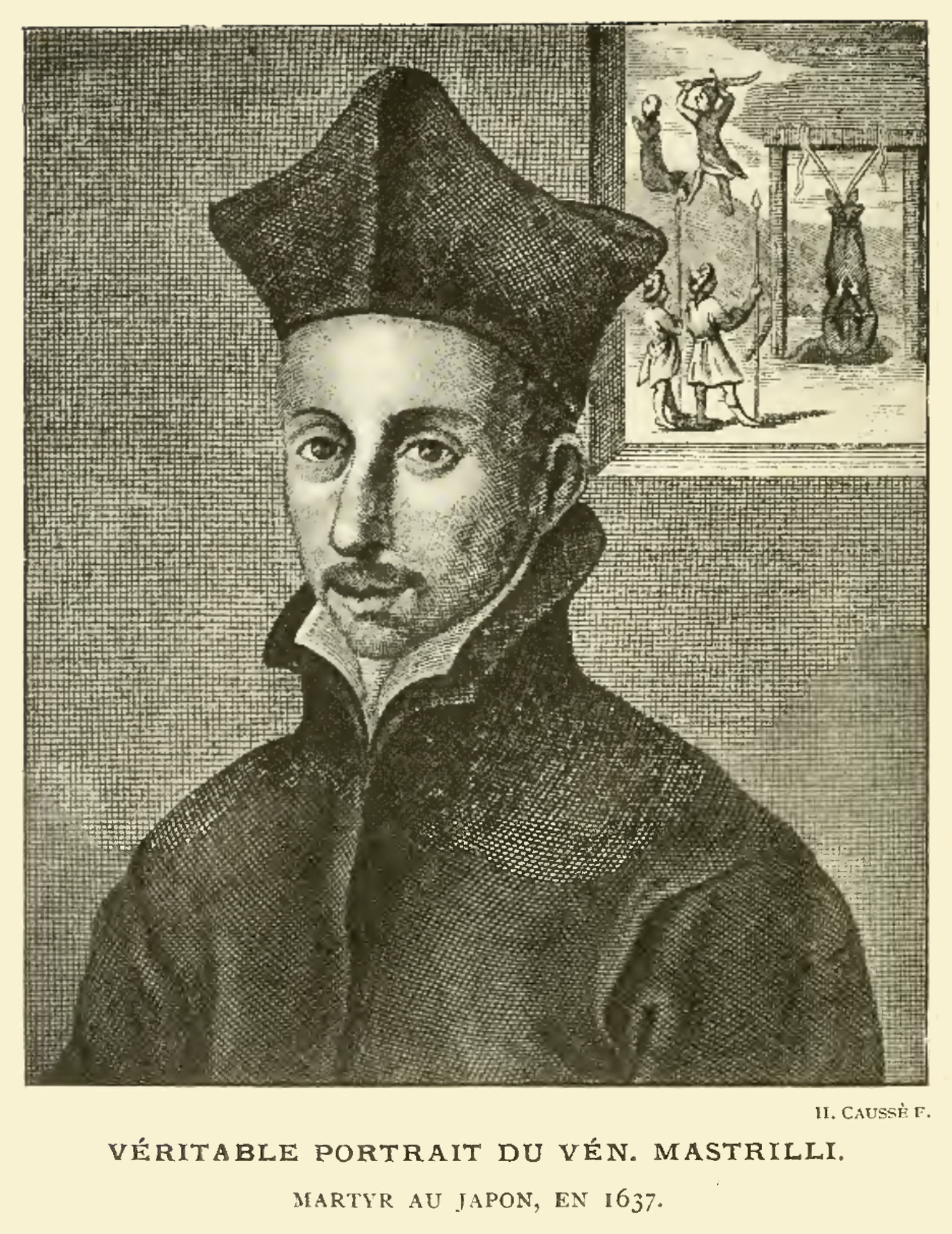

Marcello Francesco Mastrilli (1603 – October 17, 1637) was an Italian Jesuit missionary who was martyred in Japan on Mount Unzen during the Tokugawa Shogunate, which had banned Christianity in 1614. After sailing for Japan to find and possibly reconvert the notorious apostate Cristóvão Ferreira, who went to Japan and renounced his faith there, he was arrested as soon as he got off his ship. After three days of torture in the pit of Nagasaki, he was beheaded. A painting of his death, Martyrdom of Saint Marcello Mastrilli (1664), was made by Antonio Maria Vassallo.

Susceptible to visions, he was particularly influenced by visitations by the Jesuit missionary St. Francis Xavier, who appeared to him twice in 1633, and foretold him his martyrdom. St. Francis Xavier is credited with twice miraculously restoring Mastrilli's health (even if only to incite him to do missionary work in Japan), and since the account reportedly spread quickly through Italy, the "novena of grace," in honour of St. Francis Xavier, was established. Mastrilli's initiative is supposedly to thank for the presence of a silver casket in the Basilica of Bom Jesus in Old Goa, which houses relics of the body of St. Francis Xavier.

A cause for Mastrilli's beatification was formally opened on 21 January 1696, granting him the title of Servant of God.
