= Saint Augustine Altarpiece (Huguet) =

1462–1475 painting by Jaume Huguet

The Consecration of Saint Augustine
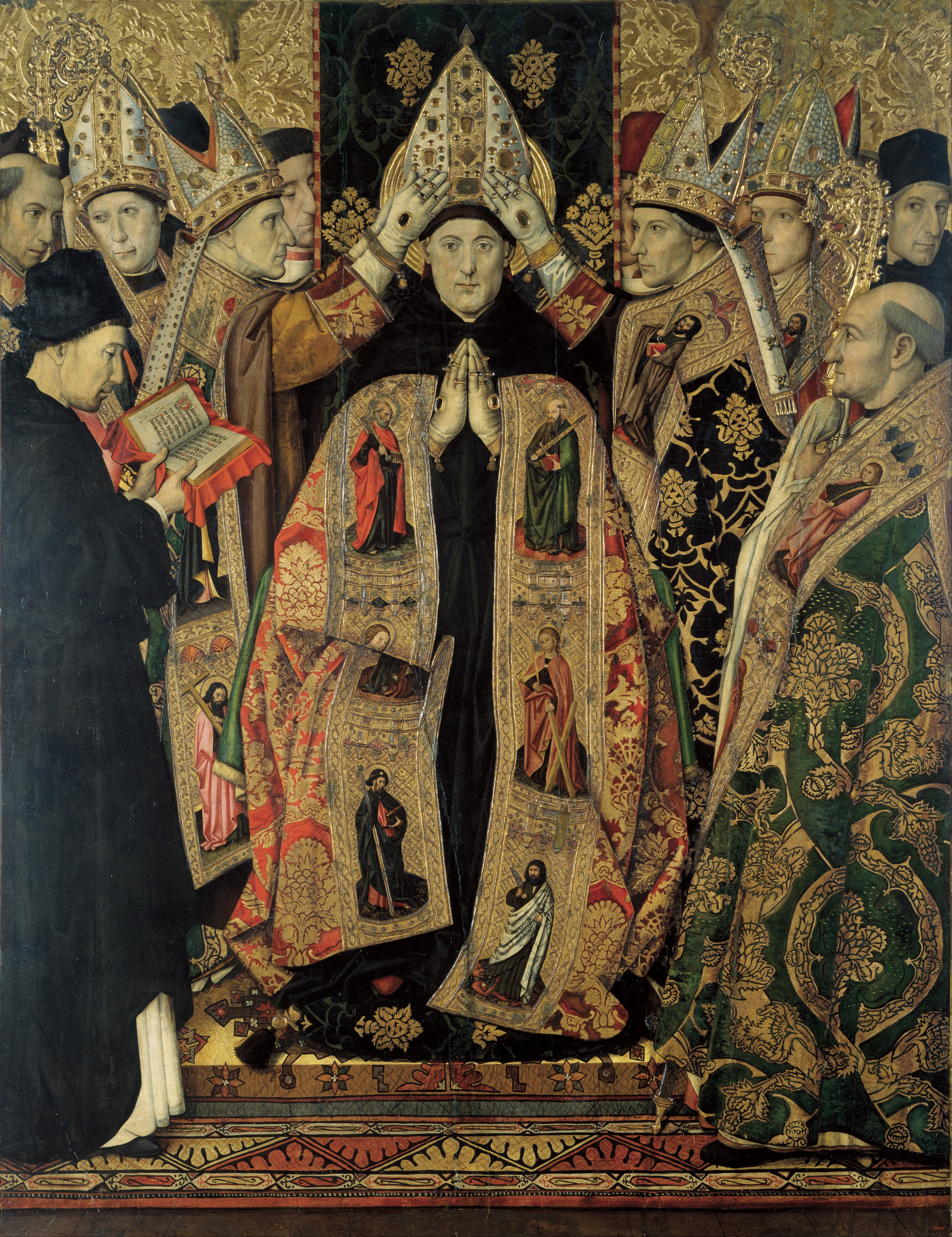
- Artist: Jaume Huguet
- Year: 1460
- Medium: Tempera on wood
- Location: Museu Nacional d'Art de Catalunya, Barcelona

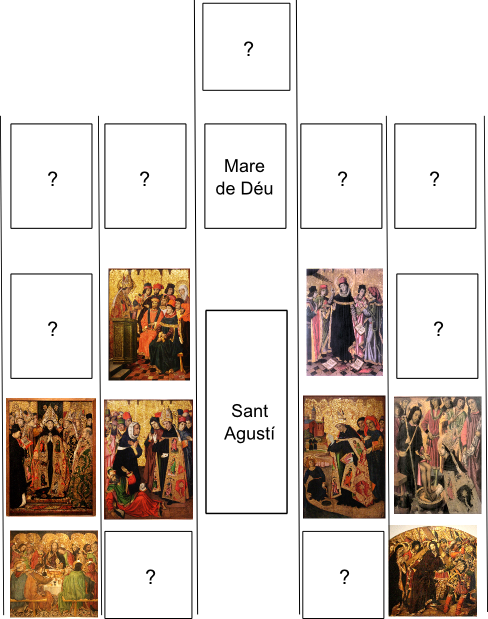
Possible original layout of the altarpiece, following F. Ruiz i Quesada

The Saint Augustine Altarpiece is a Catalan Gothic painting in egg tempera by Jaume Huguet and Pau Vergós made between 1462 and 1475. The long duration of the work was caused by financial reasons, and it is assumed that work was begun by Huguet and finished by other members of his workshop, in particular Pau Vergós. The altarpiece was commissioned by the guild of tanners to be placed on the altar of the Augustinian friary of Sant Agustí Vell ("Old St Augustine") in Barcelona, Spain. The panel measures 250 × 193 × 9.5 cm and has been in the Museu Nacional d'Art de Catalunya (MNAC) in Barcelona since 1927.

Comparisons with similar works that survive complete suggest that there were originally several more panels than the eight that now survive, seven in the MNAC and one in the Museu Marès, also in Barcelona. They would have been framed in an elaborate gilt wooden setting as a retable behind the main altar. The grandeur of the work makes it the most important painting of the fifteenth century in Catalonia.

== Description ==
In 1463 the Guild of Tanners commissioned an altarpiece from Jaume Huguet for the high altar in the church of Sant Agustí Vell in Barcelona. The unusual size of the piece, one of the largest in Catalan Gothic painting, and the crisis the country was going through at the time, delayed completion of the altarpiece until 1486 and involved several members of the Huguet workshop, and in particular a member of the Vergós family. Eight panels from this altarpiece are preserved, seven at the MNAC and another at the Museu Marès. The quality of the composition and the pictorial technique of the 'Consecration of Saint Augustine' suggest it can be considered the personal work of the great master.

Typically for Catalan painting at this date, which was conservative by Italian standards, the panel still has a "gold ground" background, decorated in textile-like patterns of pastiglia stucco relief, which is also used for the croziers and jewels on the mitres and vestments of the figures. Saint Augustine, the dedicatee of the church, is shown being consecrated by several other bishops as Bishop of Hippo in Roman North Africa, which happened in 395, although the painting shows entirely contemporary styles of dress. The unvested figure reading a book in a chemise covering on the left is a donor portrait of one of the friars, probably the head of the community. Another friar's head, looking like a portrait, peeps out at the rear right.

== History ==
The work on the altarpiece began on 20 July 1452, when the carpenter Macia Bonafé was given the contract to construct the retable. It was stipulated that the altarpiece was to rest on a stone base with doors on either side leading to the sacristy. Bonafé was also to create a figure of the Madonna, which was to rest in a niche, as well as the heraldic lions of the guild. On the same day Bonafé received his contract, the guildsmen engaged Luis Dalmau to begin working on painting as soon as the construction of the retable was finished. Dalmau ended up doing no actual work on the piece, for reasons unknown, and on 4 December 1463 the contract was given to Jaume Huguet. For payment, Huguet received one hundred and ten lliures on 1 February and 1 July 1464, and was thereafter to draw fifty six lliures every Christmas until the full amount had been paid.

The whole arrangement was very businesslike with very clear instructions on how Huguet was to proceed. He was first to paint the four panels of the predella with scenes from the Passion as conceived in a sketch that he had presented to the guild, and this portion was to be completed by Christmas 1466. Huguet was also tasked with painting the figures of saints on the sacristy doors, coloring the statues, and painting the heraldic lions. Before he was allowed to begin any painting, he had to present drawings for the approval of the guild and two painters, one chosen by the guild and the other chosen by Huguet. With the expectation that much of the work would be done by assistants, as it was a very large undertaking, it was specified that Huguet himself would be responsible for painting the heads and hands.

It is not until 29 November 1486 that the altarpiece is spoken of as being completed, twenty three years after Huguet was originally commissioned. The documents also show that Huguet was not paid as originally promised and did not receive his full sum until 1488, when he was still owed 200 lliures. The reasons for the delay are unknown, but there a couple conjectures as to what happened. One is that the Constable Dom Pedro arrived six weeks after the contract was drawn up and engaged Huguet to paint him a retable, which would have taken precedence over that of the guild. It could also be that the guild lost interest or had a lack of finances that temporarily halted the project.

== Gallery ==
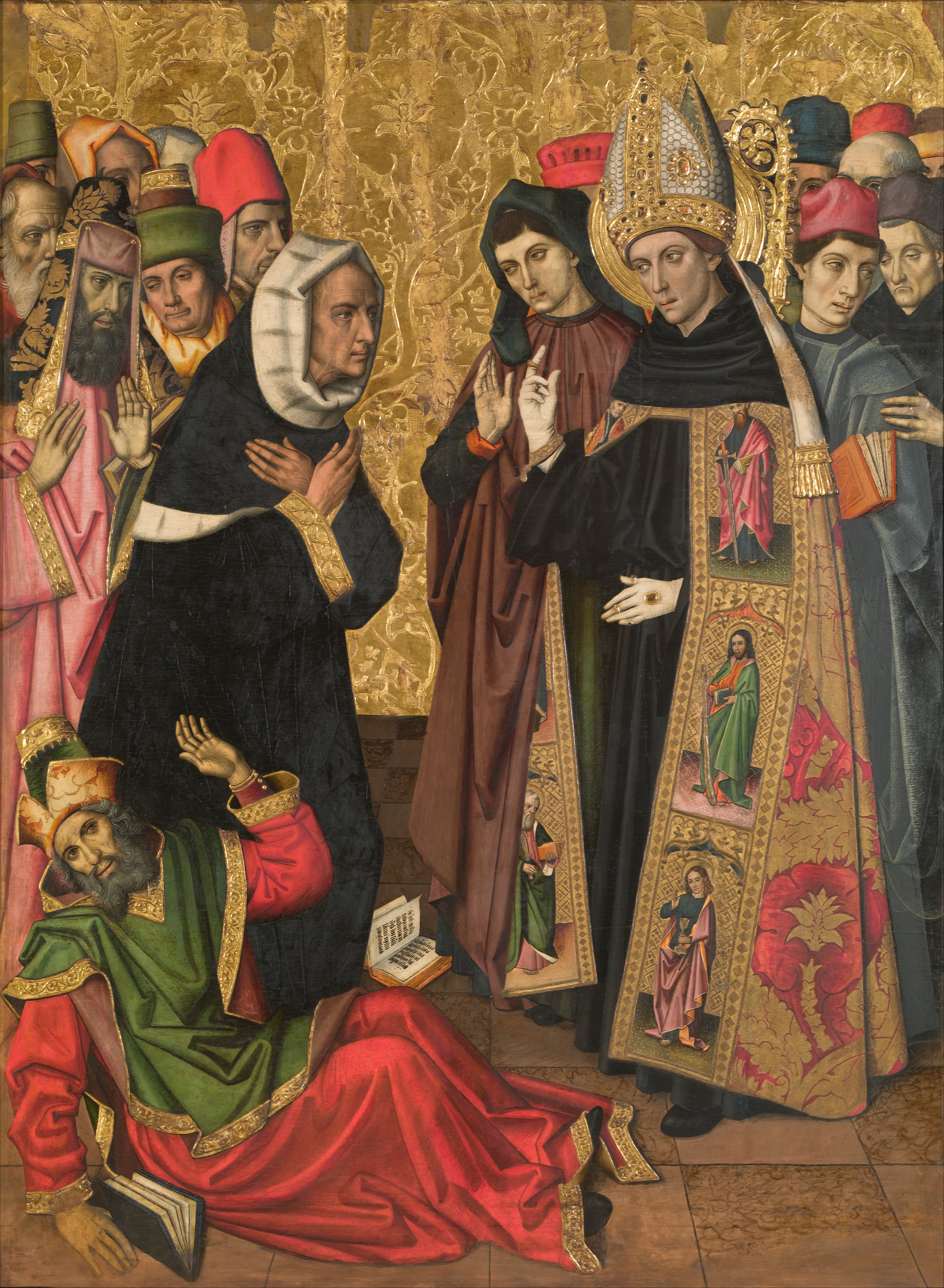
Saint Augustine Disputing with the Heretics by Vergós Group

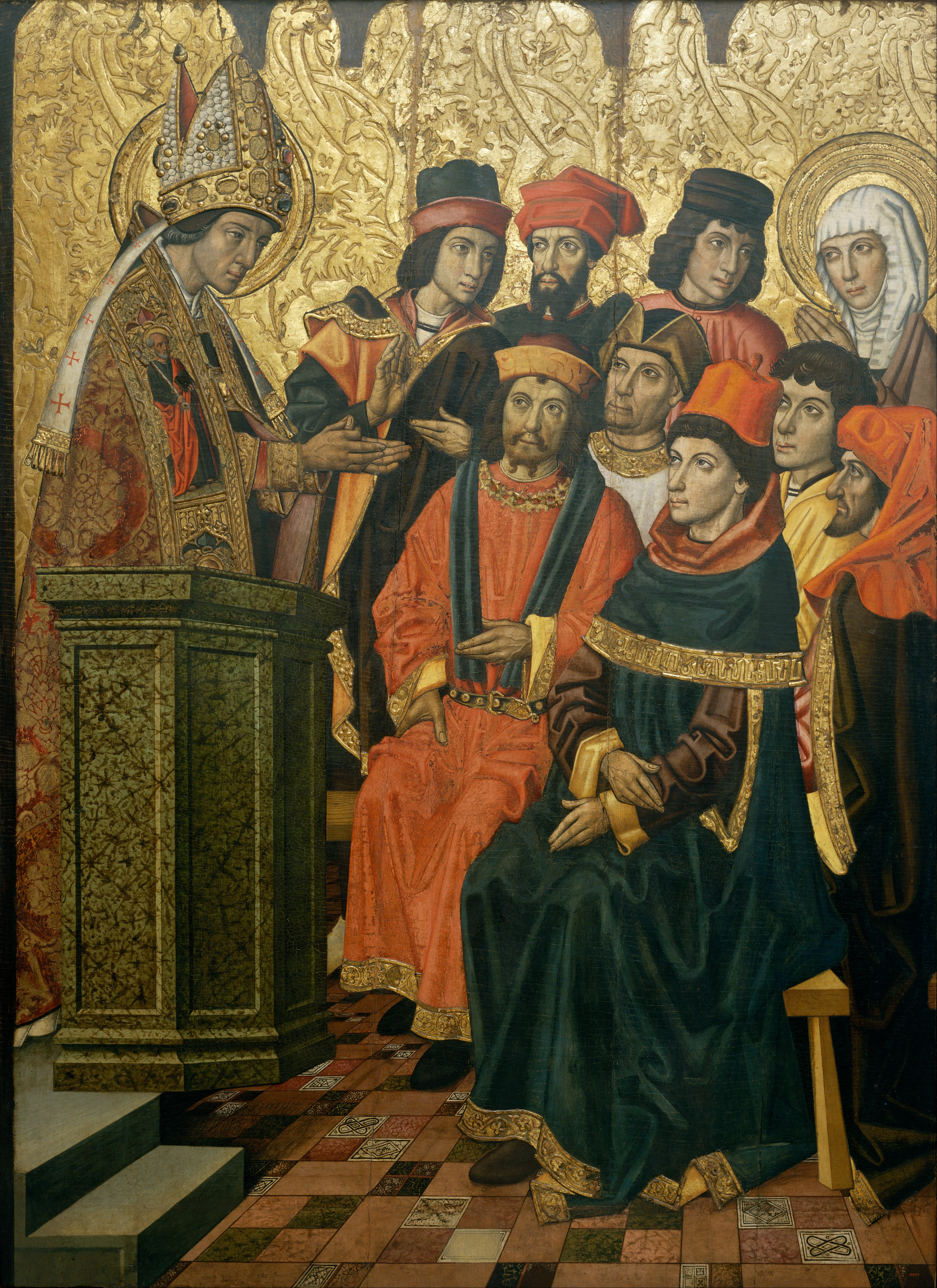
Saint Augustine and Saint Monica in a Sermon by Saint Ambrose by Vergós Group

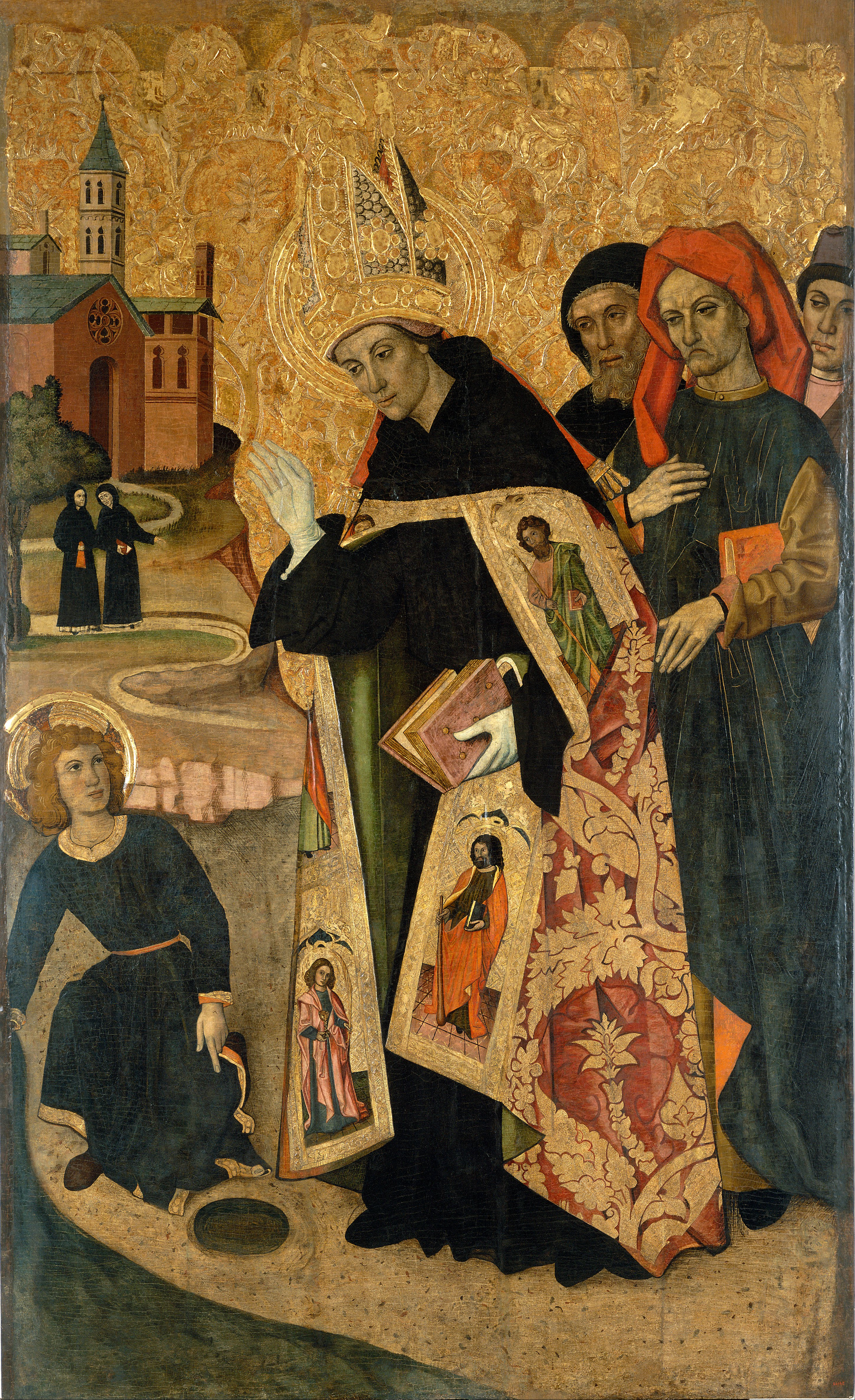
Saint Augustine Meditates on the Trinity when the Child Jesus Appears before him by Vergós Group

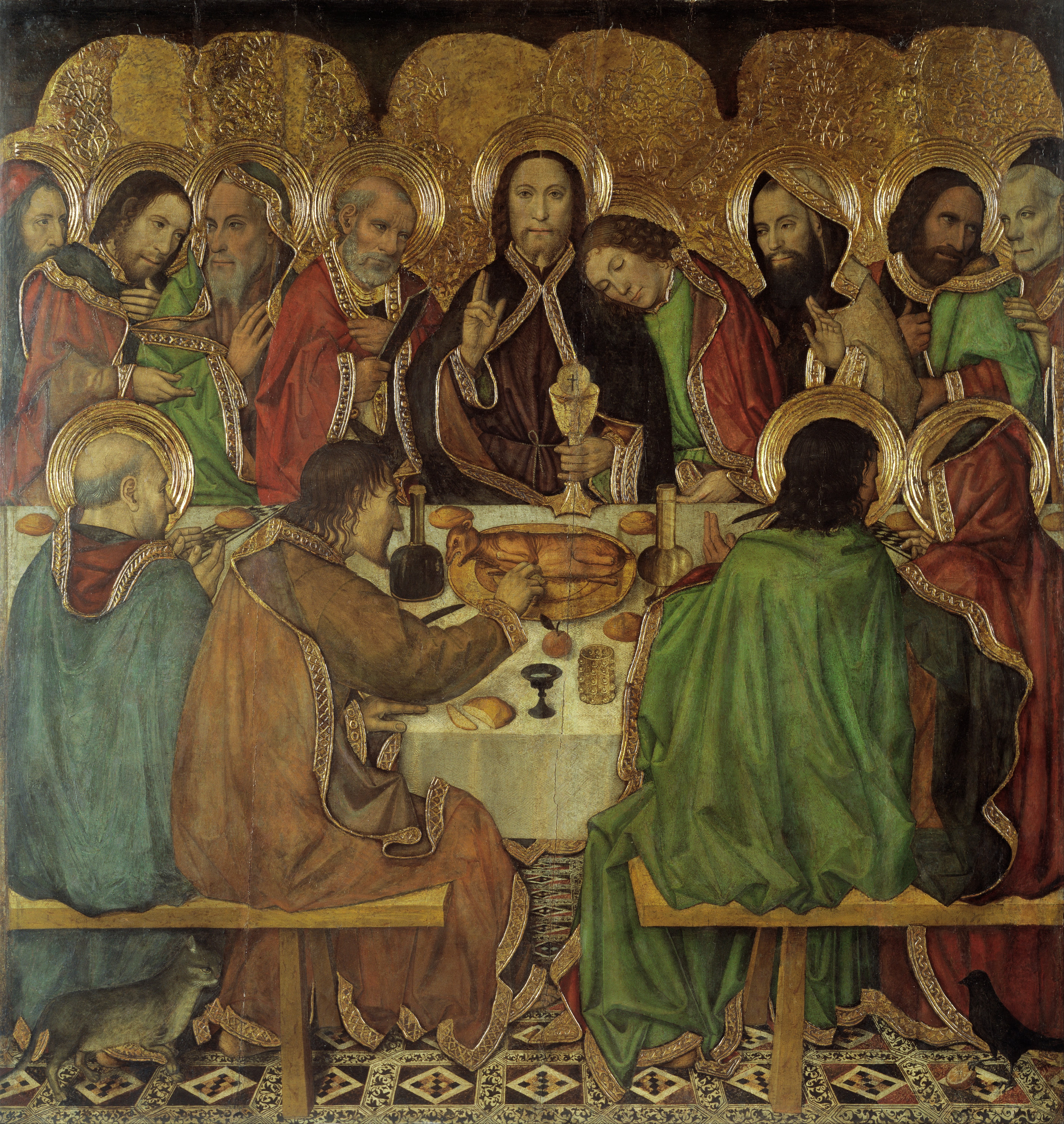
Last Supper by Jaume Huguet

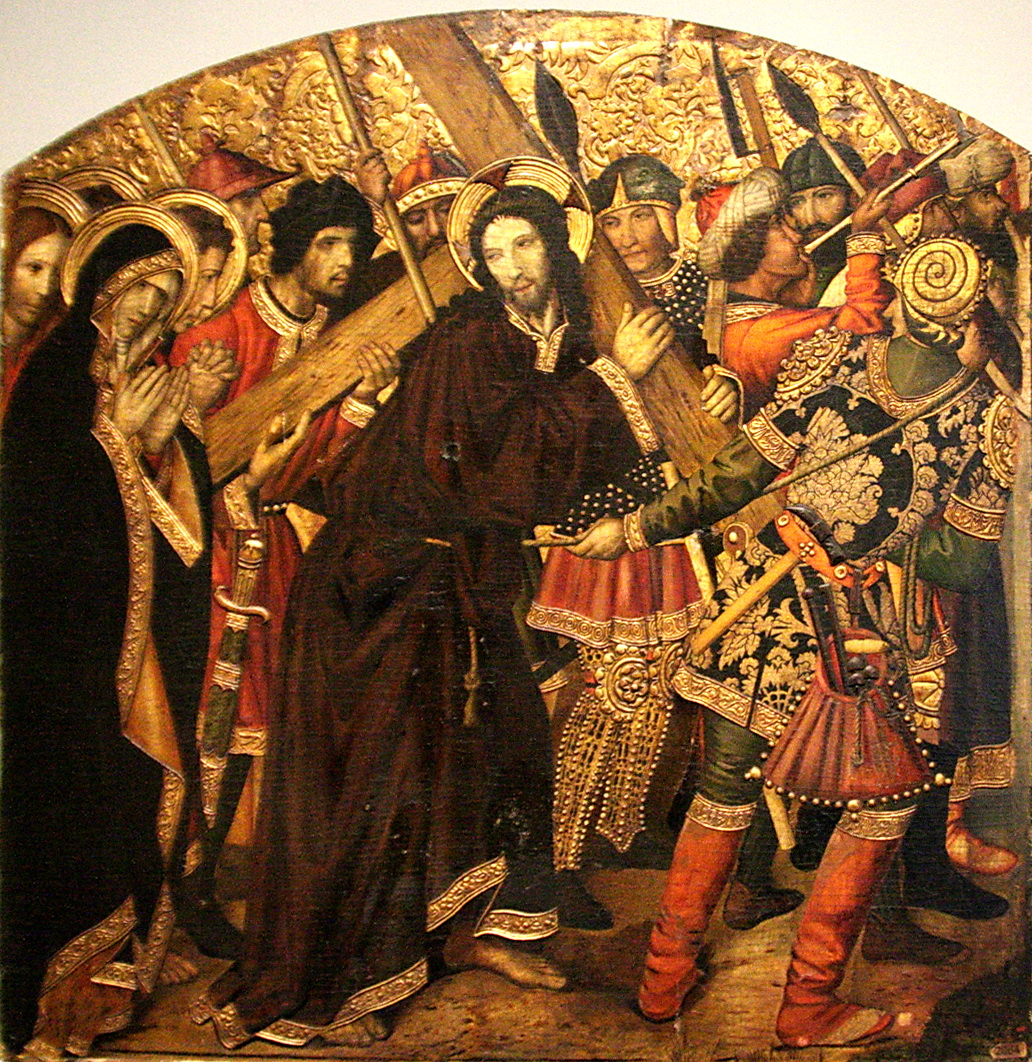
Road to Calvary by Jaume Huguet

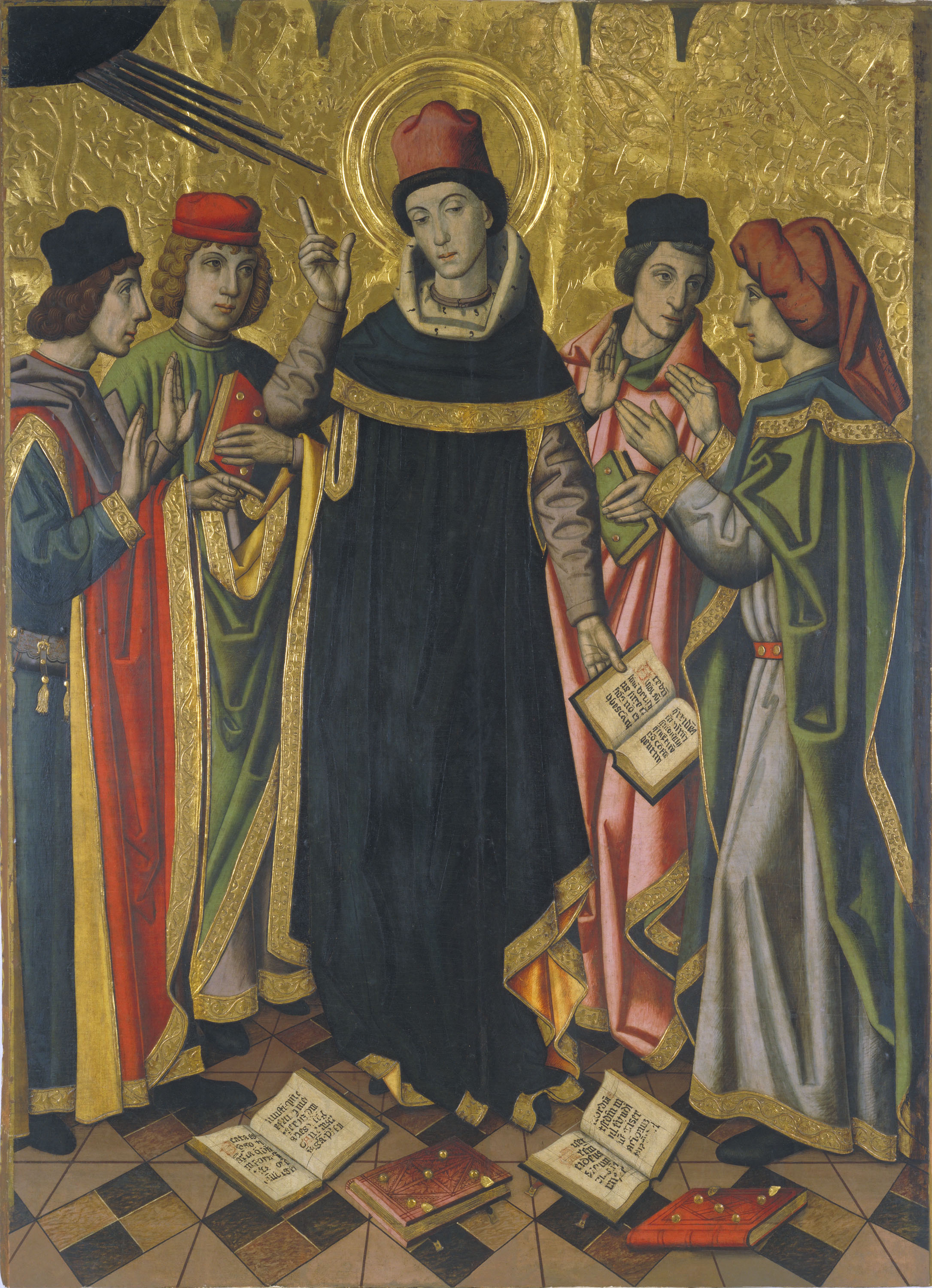
Conversion of Saint Augustine by Jaume Huguet

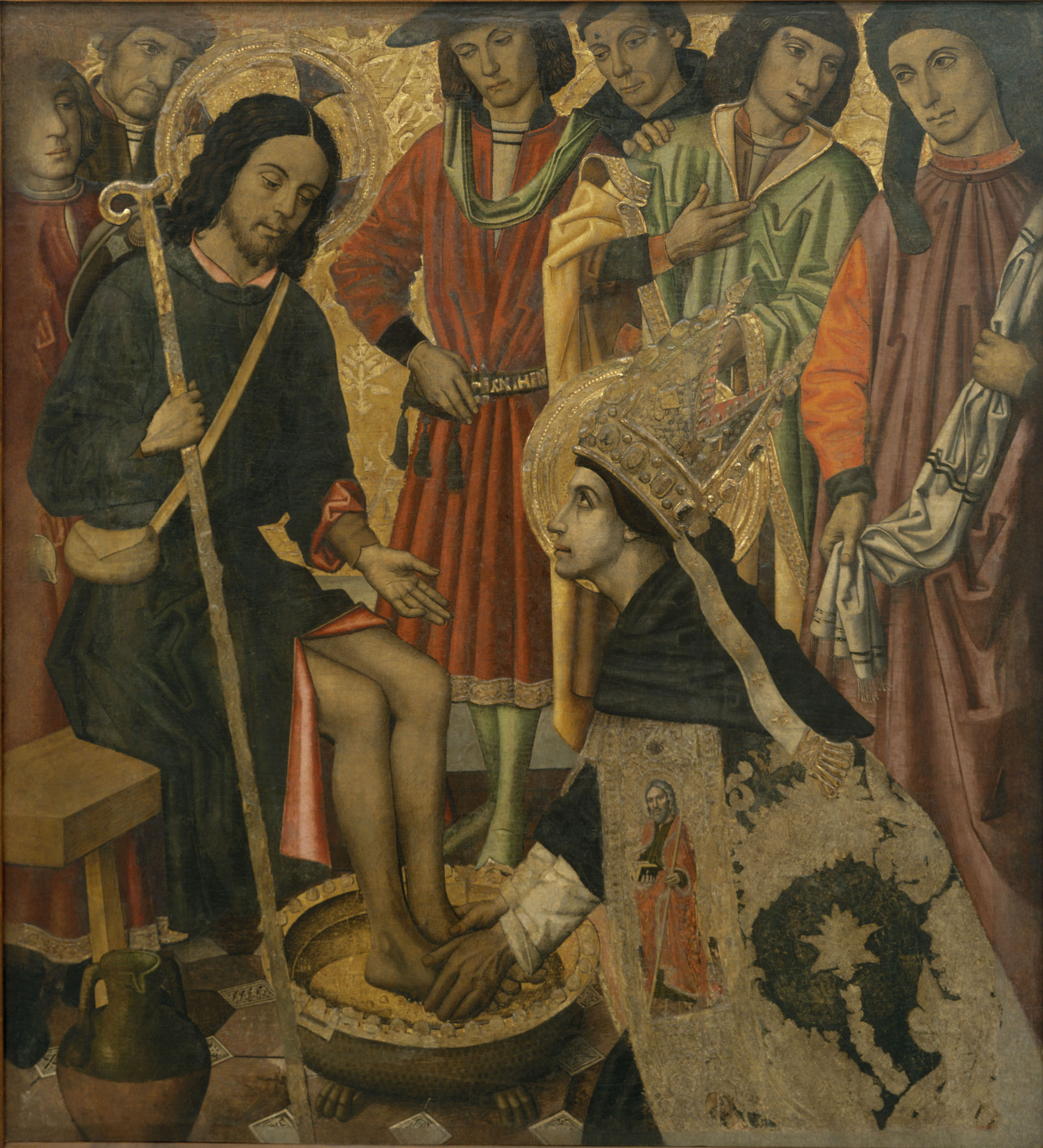
Saint Augustine Washes the Feet of the Pilgrim Christ by Huguet
