= Gabriele Paleotti =

Catholic cardinal (1522-1597)

His Eminence Gabriele Paleotti
- Cardinal, Archbishop of Bologna
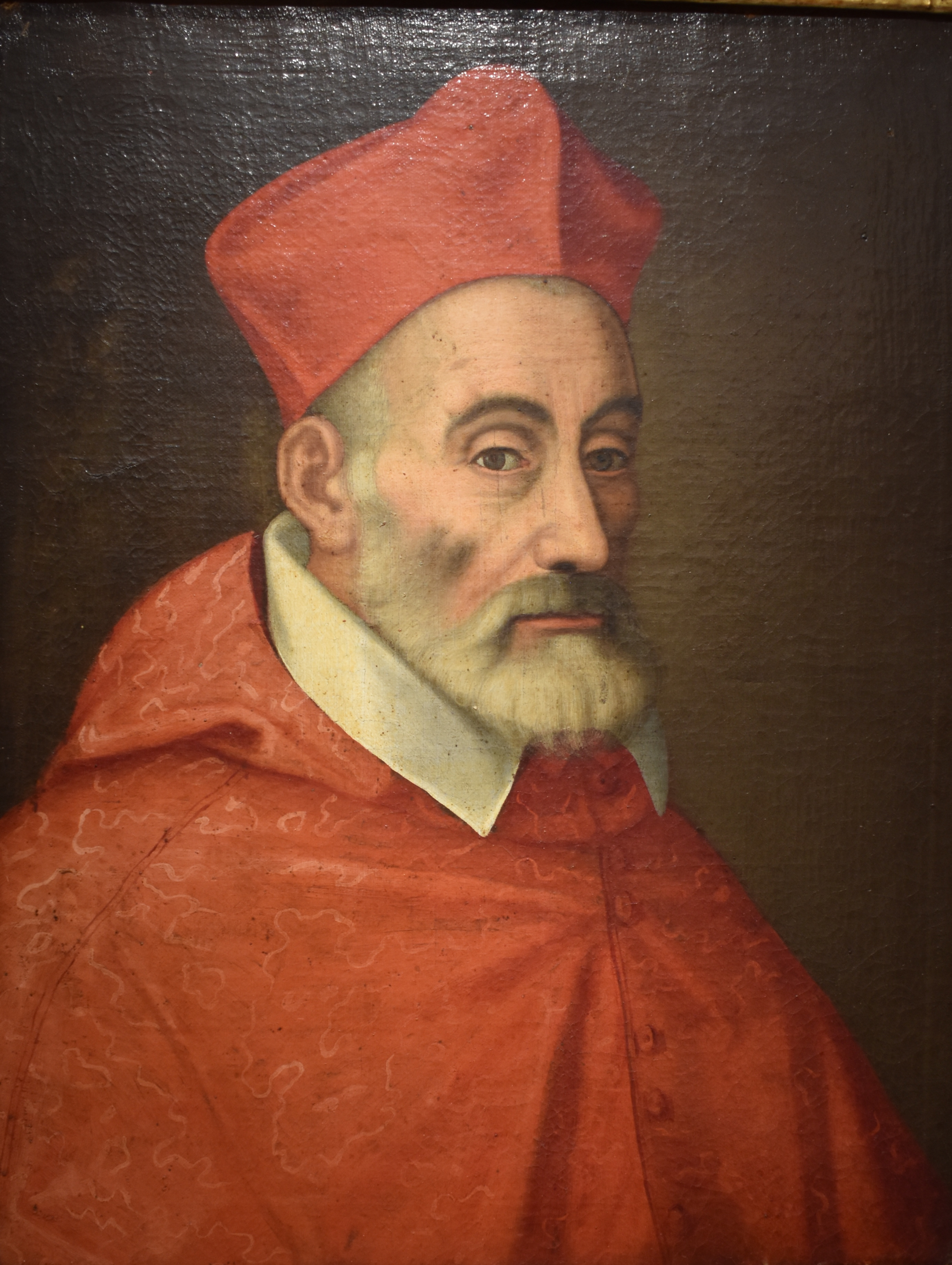
- Portrait of Cardinal Gabriele Paleotti
- Church: Roman Catholic
- Appointed: 10 December 1582
- Term ended: 22 July 1597
- Successor: Alfonso Paleotti
- Other post: Cardinal-Bishop of Sabina (1591–97)

Orders
- Ordination: 9 February 1566 by Carlo Borromeo
- Consecration: 10 February 1566 by Carlo Borromeo
- Created cardinal: 9 April 1565 by Pope Pius IV
- Rank: Cardinal-Bishop

Personal details
- Born: 4 October 1522 Bologna, Papal States
- Died: 22 July 1597 (aged 74) Rome, Papal States
- Coat of arms

Gabriele Paleotti (4 October 1522 – 22 July 1597) was an Italian cardinal and Archbishop of Bologna. He was a significant figure in, and source about, the later sessions of the Council of Trent, and much later a candidate for the papacy in 1590, and is now mostly remembered for his De sacris et profanis imaginibus (1582), setting out the Counter-Reformation church's views on the proper role and content of art.

== Life ==
Paleotti was born at Bologna. Having been awarded, in 1546, the title of Doctor of Civil and Canon Law (utriusque iuris), he was appointed to teach civil law. In 1549 he became a canon of the cathedral, but he did not become a priest until later. He gave up teaching in 1555, and although he had turned down office as a bishop, he became in 1556 "Auditor" or judge of the Roman Rota, then the supreme Catholic ecclesiastical court, moving to Rome.

Pope Pius IV sent him to the Council of Trent, where he played an important role, as a mediator between reformers and conservatives. His Diarium, or journal, on the proceedings of the council, forms one of the most important documents for its history. The complete text is published in the third volume of the Concilium Tridentinum.

After the Council Paleotti became one of the commission of cardinals and prelates that served as a basis of the Congregation of the council. On 12 March 1565, he himself was made a cardinal, and on 13 January 1567, was made Bishop of Bologna. In 1582 he became the diocese's first archbishop, when in 1582 that see was made an archdiocese. His early biographers praise his introduction of the Tridentine reforms in his diocese, comparing his activity at Bologna to that of Charles Borromeo at Milan, but Prodi's biography emphasizes his frustrations, struggling with an inadequate staff and indifferent clergy, as well as encountering the difficulties caused by the Papal governors of Bologna, which was part of the Papal States.

In 1589 Paleotti was obliged to take up residence in Rome when he was made Cardinal-Bishop of Albano and in 1590 Cardinal-Bishop of Sabina, both suburbicarian sees near Rome traditionally held by senior cardinals. There also he distinguished himself by his zeal for reform, although it was becoming clear that his moderate stance was not being followed by the Church. His support for the rights of bishops and cardinals against the increasing absolutism of the Popes and Curia brought him into conflict with Pope Sixtus V. At the next conclave, in 1590, which elected Pope Gregory XIV, Paleotti obtained the votes of an important minority. He died in Rome in 1597, a rather disappointed figure in his hopes for the Church and Church art, and is buried in Bologna Cathedral.

== Writings on art ==
Paleotti was, with Molanus and Cardinal Charles Borromeo, one of the most influential writers to write filling out the brief decree of the council on religious images with detailed instructions on their iconography. He did not become greatly interested in art until the 1570s, when he began work on his Discorso intorno alle imagine sacre et profane, consulting scholars and artists such as Prospero Fontana, Domenico Tibaldi and Pirro Ligorio. The Discorso was projected as a work in five books, but never completed. Two volumes and tables of contents for the rest were published in Italian in 1582 in what was intended as a provisional text, not properly revised. The work began with a consideration of the functions of religious and secular art, drawing on classical, biblical and patristic writings, and generally awarding a high place to the role of art and the position of the artist, always guided by the church. Book II discussed specific issues of iconography in religious art. Following the council, he proscribed as sin any frivolity, indecorum, and use of traditional depictions without scriptural foundation. Unlike some clerical writers, he covered secular art, demanding Catholic standards of morality and decorum in that too, though he admitted to a correspondent that artists might be under financial pressures to produce "immoral" works. He rejected the excesses of Mannerism and supported naturalistic styles that were historically accurate and easy for the simple viewer to understand, and so represented "silent preaching". The plans for books III-V were to cover respectively secular art, saints and the Trinity in art, and the decoration of buildings, with closing "exhortations to the clergy, patrons and painters".

The early religious paintings of Ludovico Carracci, working in Bologna in these years, perhaps came closest to Paleotti's prescription, but the Baroque was to take Catholic art in other directions. An attempt by one scholar to demonstrate direct influence by Paleotti's work on the movement to naturalism in the style of Annibale Carracci failed to convince most art historians, as there was no actual evidence documenting any connection. The text was never completed, with a Latin edition of essentially the unrevised first two books published in Ingolstadt in 1594. Revisions done in Rome in the 1590s, and fragmentary drafts of the last three books survive. Despite being incomplete the work was widely read in the Catholic world, and the first English translation was published in 2012. In the 1590s, the tone of the disappointed Paleotti's writing changed, becoming harsher, and he proposed an equivalent for imagery of the Index Librorum Prohibitorum.

A key book on Paleotti was written by Paolo Prodi, titled Il Cardinale Gabriele Paleotti (1522–1597), 2 vols. (Rome: Edizioni di Storia e Letteratura, 1967. David A. Lines also wrote "Gabriele Paleotti and an Unstudied 1583 Dossier on the University of Bologna", in Bologna—Cultural Crossroads from the Medieval to the Baroque: Recent Anglo-American Scholarship, ed. by Gian Mario Anselmi, Angela De Benedictis and Nicholas Terpstra (Bologna: Bononia University Press, 2012).

== Selected works ==
- De nothis spuriisque filiis liber (1573)
- Discorso intorno alle imagini sacre et profane (Latin De imaginibus sacris et profanis), in two books of a projected five, 1582 in Italian, and 1594 in Latin, and in 2012 in English as Discourse on Sacred and Profane Images (Getty, 2012)
- Episcopale Bononiensis civitatis, et diocesis (1580)
- Archiepiscopale Bononiense sive de Bononiensis ecclesiae administratione (1594)
- De Sacri Consistorii consultationibus (1594)
- De bono senectutis (1595)

== Notes ==
Records
Preceded by Gaspar Quiroga y Vela	Oldest living Member of the Sacred College; 12 November 1594 - 22 July 1597	Succeeded by Scipione Lancelotti
