= Jaume Huguet =

Catalan painter (1412–1492)

Archangel Michael, 1456

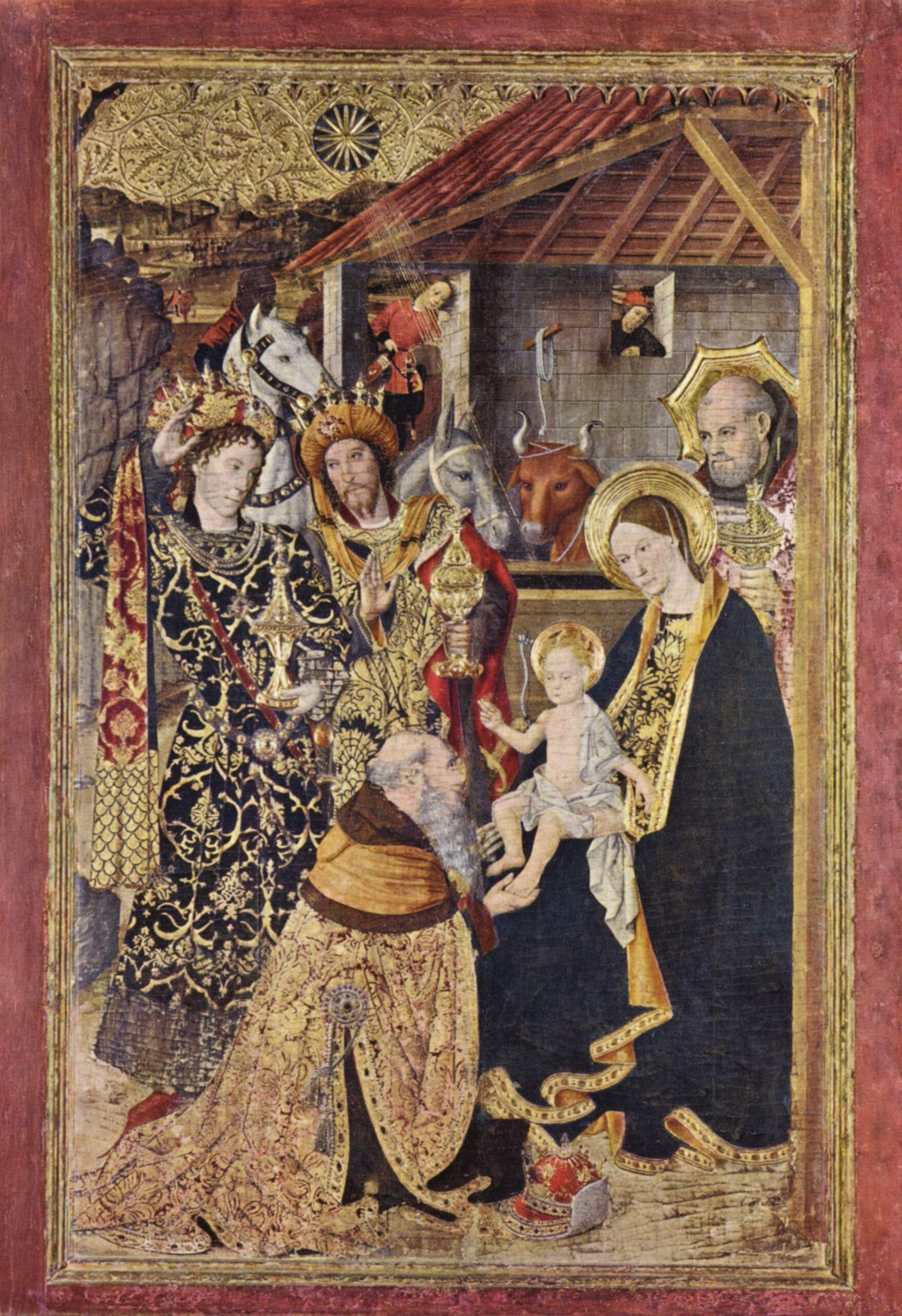
Adoration of the Magi, 1464. Central panel of the Epiphany altarpiece of the palatine chapel. Barcelona City History Museum.

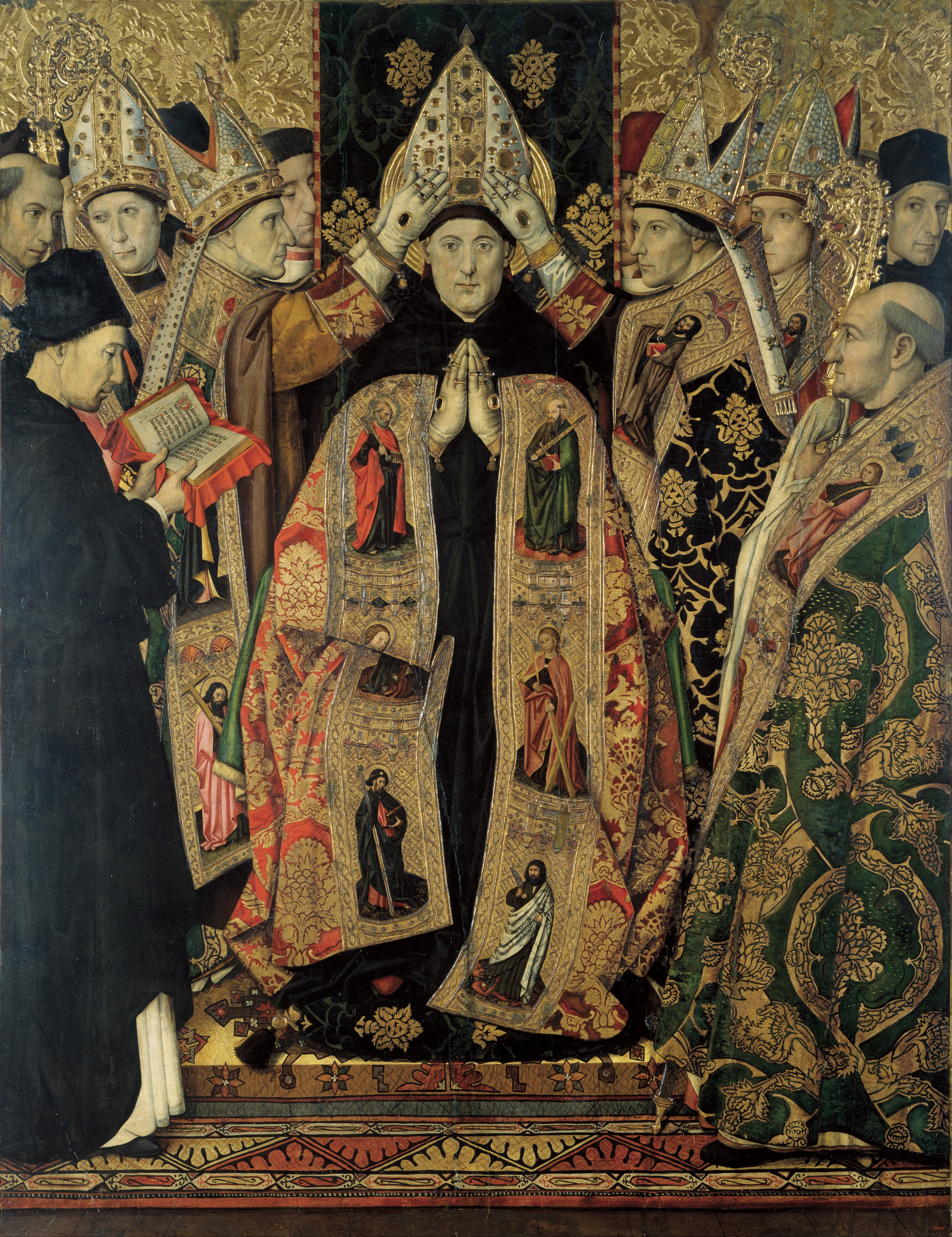
The Consecration of Saint Augustine, conserved at MNAC Barcelona

Jaume Huguet (Catalan: [ˈʒawmə uˈɣɛt]; 1412–1492) was a Catalan painter.

Originally from Valls, he moved to Tarragona to stay with his uncle Pere Huguet, who was also a painter. When they moved to Barcelona he was exposed to modern trends of the time. Between 1440 and 1445, he worked in Zaragoza and later in Tarragona, where he was influenced by the Flemish style of Luis Dalmau. He continued to paint into his mid 70s, till 1487.

A retablo from Huguet is in the Monastery of Pedralbes, while another, depicting the Adoration of the Magi (or Epiphany) is housed in the Chapel of St. Agatha in Barcelona's Palau Reial Major.

A number of works by Huguet, including The Consecration of Saint Augustine, are held in the collection of the Museu Nacional d'Art de Catalunya in Barcelona, Spain.

== Biography ==
Jaume Huguet was born about 1412 in Valls and orphaned in 1419. His father, Antoni Huguet, appointed in his will that Jaume and his brother, also named Antoni, were to be under the guardianship of Pere Huguet, the boys' uncle, and Pere Padrol. Pere Huguet was a painter and became Jaume's tutor. Jaume's beginnings by his uncle's side most likely took place at Mateu Ortenada's workshop. Following an apprenticeship, he would have completed his training at the workshop of a recognized painter, although it is unknown with whom.

While it is presumed that Huguet was actively painting in his youth, there are no documents to support this until 1448, when he gave his brother, Antoni, the legal power to accept payment for him and the instructions to cancel a job painting an altarpiece for the town of Arbeca in Tarragona. It was also in 1448 when Huguet moved his workshop to Barcelona. The first documented piece that Huguet was commissioned to paint was the high altarpiece of the Church of Sant Antoni Abat in Barcelona in 1454. Unfortunately, this piece was destroyed in 1909. In 1455, he was contracted to paint two compartments from the predella of the high altarpiece of the Church of Ripoll Monastery as well as altarpiece of Saint Abdon and Saint Senan from the Church of Sant Pere in Terrassa, which was completed in 1460.

Huguet became a highly sought after artist and was commissioned by the Crown of Catalonia and Aragon to paint the Epiphany Altarpiece from the high altar of the Chapel of the Palau Reial Major in Barcelona, which he worked on in 1464 and 1465. He also painted the central panel from the altarpiece of the Chapel of the Esparto Workers' and the Glazier's Guild in Barcelona Cathedral, which he finished in 1468. In 1465, Huguet was contracted to paint the altarpiece of Saint Anne, Saint Bartholomew and Saint Mary Magdalene, which was not completed until 1480. Because the work took so long to complete, it indicates that the creation was part of a group effort.

== Sources ==
- Van Dyke, John (2008). A Text-Book of the History of Painting. Read Books. ISBN 978-1-4437-6774-3.
- MNAC (2000). Gothic Art Guide.
