= Prayer to Saint Joseph =

Prayers in Roman Catholicism

The following are Roman Catholic prayers to Saint Joseph.

== The Catholic tradition of Saint Joseph ==
Joseph, the silent man of the Gospels, is in the line of the great men of faith of the Old Testament. He is described as a "just man", a righteous man of integrity. He is in the tradition of Abraham who was called by God to "walk before my face and be upright (Gen: 17.1);and of Moses who was told to be "entirely sincere", "entirely faithful" (Deut: 18.13). For centuries his place in the story of Jesus was comparatively unnoticed. Gradually, in Catholic tradition, he was recognised as patron of fathers of families, of bursars and procurators, of manual workers, especially carpenters, and of all who desire a holy death.

The parish in Buenos Aires where Pope Francis grew up is dedicated to San José. Solemnly inaugurated on 19 March 2013, Francis’ pontificate is placed under the protection of Saint Joseph. One of the few things the Pope had sent over from Argentina after his election is a statue he had. It depicts the saint lying down asleep, a reference to the gospel accounts of Saint Joseph receiving the counsel of angels in several dreams. The Pope slips pieces of paper with prayer requests under the pedestal of the statue, which is just outside his room at St. Martha's House.

“You know,” said Francis, “you have to be patient with these carpenters: they tell you they’ll have a piece of furniture finished in a couple of weeks and it ends up taking a month even. But they get the job done and they do it well! You just need to be patient…”

== Prayer to Saint Joseph after the Rosary ==
The purpose of Pope Leo XIII's 1889 encyclical Quamquam pluries was to implore divine help by means of prayer, joining to the intercession of Mary that of Saint Joseph. Leo XIII therefore attached to his encyclical a special Prayer to Saint Joseph requesting that it be added to the recitation of the Rosary during the month of October.

The encyclical Quamquam pluries established the Prayer to Saint Joseph is mandatory to be recited at the end of each holy Rosary recited during the Marian Month of October. The prescription is forever (in Latin: perpetuo idem servetur) and thus it can't be deleted by any subsequent Vatican document. It causes an indulgence of seven years and seven Lents. Moreover, it is recommended, even if not mandatory, in the three days preceding March 19, the day in which the Solemnity of St Joseph takes place. This type of indulgences was abolished by 'Indulgentiarum Doctrina of 1967. The Enchiridion Indulgentiarum of 2004 reports the partial indulgence for the faithful of Christ who have piously recited a prayer to "Saint Joseph, husband of the Blessed Virgin Mary", legitimately approved by an episcopal authority (for example the present To you, blessed Joseph).

The Prayer to St Joseph may be said after the customary Salve Regina and concluding prayer. It may also be used to conclude other Marian devotions.

To thee, O blessed Joseph, we have recourse in our affliction, and having implored the help of thy thrice holy Spouse, we now, with hearts filled with confidence, earnestly beg thee also to take us under thy protection. By that charity wherewith thou wert united to the Immaculate Virgin Mother of God, and by that fatherly love with which thou didst cherish the Child Jesus, we beseech thee and we humbly pray that thou wilt look down with gracious eye upon that inheritance which Jesus Christ purchased by His blood, and wilt succor us in our need by thy power and strength.

Defend, O most watchful guardian of the Holy Family, the chosen off-spring of Jesus Christ. Keep from us, O most loving Father, all blight of error and corruption. Aid us from on high, most valiant defender, in this conflict with the powers of darkness. And even as of old thou didst rescue the Child Jesus from the peril of His life, so now defend God's Holy Church from the snares of the enemy and from all adversity. Shield us ever under thy patronage, that, following thine example and strengthened by thy help, we may live a holy life, die a happy death, and attain to everlasting bliss in Heaven. Amen.

== Litany of Saint Joseph ==
The litany of Saint Joseph was sanctioned by Pope Pius X in 1909. After the usual petitions to the Holy Trinity and one to the Blessed Virgin, the litany is composed of twenty-five invocations expressing the virtues and dignities of Joseph.

Furthermore, Pius X composed a Prayer to Saint Joseph the Worker for the sanctification of labor.

== Traditional Novena ==
An invocation to Saint Joseph is traditionally prayed for nine days before the Feast of Saint Joseph, starting on March 10. It is found in many places, and was released in 1950 with the Imprimatur of the Bishop of Pittsburgh, Hugh C. Boyle. It is used in novenas, according to the text after the prayer, and the prayer text specifically seems to limit it to "spiritual blessings".

"O Saint Joseph, whose protection is so great, so strong, so prompt before the throne of God, I place in you all my interests and desires."

"O Saint Joseph, do assist me by your powerful intercession, and obtain for me from your Divine Son all spiritual blessings, through Jesus Christ, our Lord, So that, having engaged here below your heavenly power, I may offer my thanksgiving and homage to the most Loving of Fathers."

"O Saint Joseph, I never weary contemplating you and Jesus asleep in your arms; I dare not approach while He reposes near your heart. Press Him in my name and kiss his fine head for me and ask him to return the Kiss when I draw my dying breath."

"Saint Joseph, Patron of departed souls – pray for me. (Mention your intention) Amen."

Older copies of the prayer, sometimes contain an additional comment that,

"The above prayer was found in the fiftieth year of our Lord and Savior Jesus Christ. In 1505 it was sent from the Pope to Emperor Charles, when he was going into battle. Whoever shall read this prayer or hear it, or keep it about themselves, shall never die a sudden death or be drowned, nor shall poison take effect on them; neither shall they fall into the hands of the enemy, or shall be burned in any fire or shall be overpowered in any battle. Say for nine mornings in a row for anything you may desire. It has never been known to fail."

However, the year 50 A.D. is a very early date for a published prayer, preceding much of the New Testament, which does not mention very much about the father of Jesus. The statements about the year 50 A.D. and regarding the Pope and Emperor are not supported.

== "Dear Guardian of Mary" ==
"Dear Guardian of Mary" is a hymn written in honor of Saint Joseph by Frederick William Faber in 1863.

== Prayer to Saint Joseph (Montfort) ==
The Prayer to Saint Joseph is a short prayer by St. Louis de Montfort intended to be prayed after his third method of praying the Holy Rosary. He instructed it to be prayed three times after the sorrowful mysteries.

Below is the version of the prayer in its original French, and its English translation. (From the Secret of the Rosary)

Je vous salue Joseph, homme juste,
la Sagesse es avec vous,
vous étes béni sur tous les hommes
et est Jésus, le fruit de Marie votre fidèle épouse.
Saint Joseph, digne père nourricier de Jésus-Christ,
priez pour nous pécheurs,
et nous obtenez de Dieu la divine Sagesse,
maintenant et à l'heure de notre mort. Ainsi soit-il.

Translation:

Hail Joseph the just,
Wisdom is with you;
blessed are you among all men
and blessed is Jesus, the fruit of Mary, your faithful spouse.
Holy Joseph, worthy foster-father of Jesus Christ,
pray for us sinners
and obtain divine Wisdom for us from God,
now and at the hour of our death. Amen.
