= List of basilicas in France =

Basilica churches, many of great architectural significance, can be found throughout France. As of 2023 there are 178 which have been officially designated as minor basilicas by the Catholic Church. They are listed below by region, along with the date of designation. Where no date is given, the church is considered a basilica from the architectural point of view and not from the ecclesiastical.

== Auvergne-Rhône-Alpes ==
Valence Cathedral	Valence, Drôme	4 May 1847
Le Puy Cathedral	Puy-en-Velay, Haute-Loire	11 Feb 1856
Chambéry Cathedral	Chambéry, Savoie	1 November 1874
Basilica of Notre-Dame, La Salette	La Salette-Fallavaux, Isère	19 January 1879
Basilica of Notre-Dame du Port; Basilique de Notre-Dame-du-Port	Clermont-Ferrand, Puy-de-Dôme	3 May 1886
Basilica of St. Jean-François Régis	Lalouvesc, Ardèche	20 April 1888
Basilica of Notre-Dame des Fers, Orcival ("Basilica of Our Lady of the Irons, Orcival")	Orcival, Puy-de-Dôme	17 July 1894
Basilica of Notre-Dame de Fourvière	Lyon, Rhône	16 March 1897
Basilica of St. Anne, Bonlieu-sur-Roubion	Bonlieu-sur-Roubion, Drôme	11 September 1899
Basilica of St. Martin, Ainay	Ainay, Rhône	23 June 1905
Basilica of St. Amable, Riom; Basilique Saint-Amable de Riom	Riom, Puy-de-Dôme	7 March 1912
Basilica of Notre-Dame des Miracles, Mauriac ("Basilica of Our Lady of the Miracles, Mauriac")	Mauriac, Cantal	10 August 1921
Basilica of Notre-Dame de l'Osier, Vinay ("Basilica of Our Lady of the Reed, Vinay")	Vinay, Isère	27 February 1924
Basilica of Notre-Dame de Bon Secours, Lablachère ("Basilica of Our Lady of Good Help, Lablachère")	Lablachère, Ardèche	14 August 1930
Basilica of St. Joseph, Grenoble	Grenoble, Isère	14 April 1937
Aiguebelle Abbey	Montjoyer, Drôme	24 May 1937
Moulins Cathedral	Moulins, Allier	28 October 1949
Basilica of the Visitation, Annecy	Annecy, Savoie	17 August 1951
Basilica of Sacré Cœur, Grenoble; Basilique du Sacré-Cœur de Grenoble	Grenoble, Isère	16 June 1952
Basilica of St. Julien, Brioude; Basilique Saint-Julien de Brioude	Brioude, Haute-Loire	26 April 1957
Basilica of St. Joseph des Fins, Annecy	Annecy, Savoie	11 July 1964
Basilica of St. François de Sales, Thonon-les-Bains	Thonon-les-Bains, Haute-Savoie	8 July 1993
Basilica of St. Sixtus, Ars	Ars-sur-Formans, Ain	4 August 1997
Basilica of St. Bonaventure, Lyon	Lyon, Rhône	4 March 2019
Basilica of St. Joseph of Good Hope	Espaly-Saint-Marcel, Haute-Loire	24 May 2021

== Bourgogne-Franche-Comté ==
Nevers Cathedral	Nevers, Nièvre	13 January 1868
Basilica of Sacré Coeur, Paray-le-Monial	Paray-le-Monial, Saône-et-Loire	26 January 1875
Besançon Cathedral	Besançon, Doubs	1 February 1877
Basilica of St. Ferjeux; Basilique Saint-Ferréol et Saint-Ferjeux de Besançon	Besançon, Doubs	14 February 1912
Basilica of Notre-Dame la Blanche, Faverney	Faverney, Haute-Saône	14 February 1912
Basilica of St. Andoche, Saulieu	Saulieu, Côte d'Or	22 October 1919
Vézelay Abbey	Vézelay, Yonne	4 May 1920
Basilica of St. Pierre, Luxeuil-les-Bains; Basilique Saint-Pierre de Luxeuil-les-Bains	Luxeuil-les-Bains, Haute-Saône	28 October 1925
Basilica of Notre-Dame, Gray	Gray, Haute-Saône	23 April 1948
Autun Cathedral	Autun, Saône-et-Loire	8 April 1949
Saint-Claude Cathedral	Saint-Claude, Jura	10 June 1950
Basilica of Notre-Dame, Dole; Basilique Notre-Dame de Dole	Dole, Jura	10 June 1950
Belfort Cathedral	Belfort, Territoire de Belfort	9 May 1952
Basilica of Notre-Dame, Beaune	Beaune, Côte-d'Or	10 August 1957
Basilica of Notre-Dame et Sainte Croix, La Charité-sur-Loire ("Basilica of Our Lady and the Holy Cross, La Charité-sur-Loire")	La Charité-sur-Loire, Nièvre	n.a.
Basilica of St. Bernard, Fontaine-lès-Dijon	Fontaine-lès-Dijon, Côte-d'Or	n.a.

== Bretagne ==
Basilica of Notre-Dame, Le Folgoët	Le Folgoët, Finistère	1427
Quimper Cathedral	Quimper, Finistère	11 March 1870
Basilica of Sainte-Anne-d'Auray	Sainte-Anne-d'Auray, Morbihan	22 May 1874
Saint-Brieuc Cathedral	Saint-Brieuc, Côtes-d'Armor	3 September 1875
Vannes Cathedral	Vannes, Morbihan	9 February 1886
Basilica of Notre-Dame du Roncier ("Basilica of Our Lady of the Bramble")	Josselin, Morbihan	12 April 1891
Basilica of Notre-Dame de Bon Secours, Guingamp ("Basilica of Our Lady of Good Help, Guingamp")	Guingamp, Côtes-d'Armor	24 October 1899
Saint-Pol-de-Léon Cathedral	Saint-Pol-de-Léon, Finistère	6 March 1901
Basilica of Notre-Dame d'Espérance, Saint-Brieuc ("Basilica of Our Lady of Hope, Saint-Brieuc")	Saint-Brieuc, Côtes-d'Armor	28 November 1902
Basilica of Notre-Dame du Paradis, Hennebont ("Basilica of Our Lady of Paradise, Hennebont")	Hennebont, Morbihan	11 December 1912
Basilica of the Saint Sauveur et Notre-Dame des Miracles et des Vertus ("Basilica of the Holy Saviour and Our Lady of Miracles and Virtues")	Rennes, Ille-et-Vilaine	22 March 1916
Basilica of St. Aubin et Notre-Dame de Bonne Nouvelle ("Basilica of St. Albinus and Our Lady of Good News")	Rennes, Ille-et-Vilaine	22 March 1916
Basilica of Notre-Dame de la Délivrance, Quintin	Quintin, Côtes-d'Armor	11 January 1933
Tréguier Cathedral	Tréguier, Côtes-d'Armor	28 February 1947
Basilica of Notre-Dame, La Guerche-de-Bretagne	La Guerche-de-Bretagne, Ille-et-Vilaine	10 March 1951
Basilica of the Saint Sauveur, Dinan ("Basilica of the Holy Saviour, Dinan")	Dinan, Côtes-d'Armor	27 April 1953
Basilica of Notre-Dame de Joie, Pontivy {"Basilica of Our Lady of Joy, Pontivy")	Pontivy, Morbihan	10 January 1959

== Centre-Val de Loire ==
Orléans Cathedral	Orléans, Loiret	26 January 1855
Basilica of Sacré Coeur, Issoudun; Basilique Notre-Dame du Sacré-Cœur d'Issoudun	Issoudun, Indre	17 July 1874
Basilica of Notre-Dame, Cléry	Cléry-Saint-André, Loiret	22 February 1894
Basilica of Notre-Dame des Enfants ("Basilica of Our Lady of the Children, Châteauneuf-sur-Cher")	Châteauneuf-sur-Cher, Cher	30 April 1898
Chartres Cathedral	Chartres, Eure-et-Loir	29 January 1908
Basilica of St. Jacques, Neuvy-Saint-Sépulchre; Basilique Saint-Jacques de Neuvy-Saint-Sépulchre	Neuvy-Saint-Sépulchre, Indre	23 November 1910
Basilica of St. Martin, Tours; Basilique Saint-Martin de Tours	Tours, Indre-et-Loire	25 March 1925
Basilica of St. Benedict, Saint-Benoît-sur-Loire	Saint-Benoît-sur-Loire, Loiret	8 July 1949
Basilica of Notre-Dame de la Trinité, Blois	Blois, Loir-et-Cher	22 June 1956

== Grand-Est ==
Abbey of Saint-Remi	Reims, Marne	17 June 1870
Basilica of St. Epvre, Nancy	Nancy, Meurthe-et-Moselle	26 November 1874
Basilica of Notre-Dame, Marienthal	Haguenau, Bas-Rhin	31 May 1892
Basilica of St. Pierre Fourier, Mattaincourt	Mattaincourt, Vosges	26 June 1897
Basilica of St. Clotilde, Reims; Basilique Sainte-Clotilde de Reims	Reims, Marne	10 March 1902
Basilica of Sacré Cœur, Nancy	Nancy, Meurthe-et-Moselle	27 September 1905
Basilica of Notre-Dame, L'Épine	L'Épine, Marne	26 November 1913
Basilica of St. Martin du Sacré Coeur, Lutterbach; Basilique Saint-Martin-du-Sacré-Coeur de Lutterbach	Lutterbach, Haut-Rhin	13 December 1922
Basilica of Notre-Dame de Lourdes, Nancy	Nancy, Meurthe-et-Moselle	10 June 1925
Basilica of Notre-Dame de Bon Secours, Saint-Avold ("Basilica of Our Lady of Good Help, Saint-Avold")	Saint-Avold, Moselle	10 August 1932
Basilica of Saint Maurice	Épinal, Vosges	25 January 1933
Basilica of Notre-Dame de Sion	Saxon-Sion, Meurthe-et-Moselle	10 May 1933
Basilica of St. Vincent, Metz (Deconsecrated during the 1980s)	Metz, Moselle	14 June 1933
Basilica of Our Lady, Thierenbach, Thierenbach Priory	Jungholtz, Haut-Rhin	25 March 1936
Basilica of St. Joan of Arc, Domrémy-la-Pucelle; Basilique Sainte-Jeanne-d'Arc de Domrémy-la-Pucelle (also known as the Basilique du Bois Chenu)	Domrémy-la-Pucelle, Vosges	4 June 1938
Basilica of Notre-Dame d'Espérance, Charleville-Mézières ("Basilica of Our Lady of Hope, Charleville-Mézières")	Charleville-Mézières, Ardennes	8 February 1946
Verdun Cathedral	Verdun, Meuse	25 April 1947
Basilica of St. John the Baptist, Chaumont; Basilique Saint-Jean-Baptiste de Chaumont	Chaumont, Haute-Marne	11 June 1948
Basilica of St. Nicolas de Port	Saint-Nicolas-de-Port, Meurthe-et-Moselle	25 June 1950
Basilica of St. Urbain, Troyes; Basilique Saint-Urbain de Troyes	Troyes, Aube	29 February 1964
Basilica of Notre-Dame, Avioth	Avioth, Meuse	12 May 1993
Basilica of Notre-Dame, Mont Sainte-Odile; Basilique Notre-Dame du Mont Sainte-Odile	Ottrott, Bas-Rhin	16 June 2006

== Hauts-de-France ==
Amiens Cathedral	Amiens, Somme	12 December 1854
Arras Cathedral	Arras, Pas-de-Calais	18 December 1855
Soissons Cathedral	Soissons, Aisne	10 March 1857
Basilica of St. Quentin	Saint-Quentin, Aisne	5 December 1876
Basilica of Notre-Dame, Boulogne	Boulogne-sur-Mer, Pas-de-Calais	4 April 1879
Basilica of Notre-Dame des Miracles, Saint-Omer ("Basilica of Our Lady of the Miracles, Saint-Omer")	Saint-Omer, Pas-de-Calais	4 April 1879
Cambrai Cathedral	Cambrai, Nord	17 March 1896
Basilica of Notre-Dame de Brebières	Albert, Somme	7 June 1899
Lille Cathedral	Lille, Nord	7 October 1904
Basilica of Notre-Dame, Liesse	Liesse, Aisne	11 December 1912
Basilica of Notre-Dame du Saint Cordon, Valenciennes ("Basilica of Our Lady of the Holy Cord, Valencienne")	Valenciennes, Nord	14 June 1922
Basilica of St. Maxellende, Caudry; Basilique Sainte-Maxellende de Caudry	Caudry, Nord	3 September 1991

== Île-de-France (Paris region) ==
Notre-Dame de Paris (Cathédrale Notre Dame de Paris)	Paris 4e	27 February 1805
Basilica of St. Clotilde, Paris, or Saints Clotilde and Valerius; Basilique Sainte-Clotilde, Paris or Basilique Sainte-Clotilde et Saint-Valéry, Paris	Paris 7e	29 April 1898
Basilica of St. Denys, Argenteuil; Basilique Saint-Denys de Argenteuil	Argenteuil, Val d'Oise	23 August 1898
Meaux Cathedral	Meaux, Seine-et-Marne	12 June 1912
Basilica of Notre-Dame de Bonne Garde, Longpont-sur-Orge ("Basilica of Our Lady of Good Protection, Longpont-sur-Orge")	Longpont-sur-Orge, Essonne	26 February 1913
Basilica of Sacré-Coeur	Paris 18e	13 August 1919
Basilica of Notre-Dame des Victoires, Paris ("Basilica of Our Lady of Victories, Paris")	Paris 2e	23 February 1927
Basilica of Notre-Dame du Perpétuel Secours, Paris ("Basilica of Our Lady of Perpetual Succour, Paris")	Paris 11e	25 June 1966
Basilica of Our Lady of Boulogne, Boulogne-Billancourt	Boulogne-Billancourt, Hauts-de-Seine	12 January 2025
Basilica of St. Denis	Saint-Denis, Seine-Saint-Denis	n.a.
Basilica of St. Mathurin, Larchant	Larchant, Seine-et-Marne	n.a.

== Normandie ==
Sées Cathedral	Sées, Orne	7 March 1871
Basilica of St. Gervais and St. Protais, Avranches; Basilique Saint-Gervais-et-Saint-Protais d'Avranches	Avranches, Manche	20 November 1894
Basilica of Notre-Dame de la Délivrande, Douvres	Douvres-la-Délivrande, Calvados	13 July 1895
Basilica of Our Lady of the Immaculate Conception, Sées; Basilique Notre-Dame-de-l’Immaculée-Conception de Sées	Sées, Orne	4 July 1902
Basilica of Sacré Cœur, Rouen	Rouen, Seine-Maritime	23 January 1918
Basilica of Notre-Dame, Bonsecours	Bonsecours, Seine-Maritime	12 February 1919
Basilica of the Holy Trinity, Cherbourg	Cherbourg, Manche	9 November 1921
Basilica of Notre-Dame, Montligeon	La-Chapelle-Montligeon, Orne	14 March 1928
Basilica of Notre-Dame de la Couture, Bernay; Basilique Notre-Dame de la Couture	Bernay, Eure	22 July 1949
Basilica of St. Thérèse, Lisieux; Basilique Sainte-Thérèse de Lisieux	Lisieux, Calvados	4 June 1954
Basilica of Our Lady of Alençon	Alençon, Orne	6 June 2009

== Nouvelle-Aquitaine ==
Saintes Cathedral	Saintes, Charente-Maritime	8 April 1870
Basilica of St. Severinus, Bordeaux; Basilique Saint-Seurin de Bordeaux	Bordeaux, Gironde	27 June 1873
Basilica of Notre-Dame, Bon-Encontre	Bon-Encontre, Lot-et-Garonne	15 June 1875
Basilica of St. Eutropius, Saintes	Saintes, Charente-Maritime	11 May 1886
Périgueux Cathedral	Périgueux, Dordogne	1 July 1897
Basilica of St. Michael, Bordeaux; Basilique Saint-Michel de Bordeaux	Bordeaux, Gironde	1 April 1903
Poitiers Cathedral	Poitiers, Vienne	1 March 1912
Basilica of Notre-Dame, Verdelais	Verdelais, Gironde	12 December 1923
Basilica of Notre-Dame, Arcachon	Arcachon, Gironde	9 March 1953
Basilica of Notre-Dame de Pitié, La Chapelle-Saint-Laurent ("Basilica of Our Lady of Pity, La Chapelle-Saint-Laurent")	La Chapelle-Saint-Laurent, Deux-Sèvres	29 February 1964
Basilica of Notre-Dame, Buglose	Saint-Vincent-de-Paul, Landes	2 August 1966
Basilica of Saint-Michel-des-Lions	Limoges, Haute-Vienne	2 February 2023

== Occitanie ==
Montpellier Cathedral	Montpellier, Hérault	20 July 1847
Basilica of Our Lady of the Immaculate Conception, Lourdes; Basilique Notre-Dame-de-l'Immaculée-Conception de Lourdes	Lourdes, Hautes-Pyrénées	13 March 1874
Mende Cathedral	Mende, Lozère	22 May 1874
Rodez Cathedral	Rodez, Aveyron	29 December 1874
Perpignan Cathedral	Perpignan, Pyrénées-Orientales	7 December 1875
Basilica of Notre-Dame de la Daurade, Toulouse	Toulouse, Haute-Garonne	2 May 1876
Nîmes Cathedral	Nîmes, Gard	16 February 1877
Basilica of St. Sernin, Toulouse; Basilique Saint-Sernin de Toulouse	Toulouse, Haute-Garonne	5 April 1878
Narbonne Cathedral	Narbonne, Aude	20 August 1886
Basilica of St. Nazaire and St. Celse, Carcassonne	Carcassonne, Aude	10 June 1898
Basilica of Notre-Dame de Marceille, Limoux	Limoux, Aude	5 February 1912
Basilica of the Holy Saviour, Rocamadour; Basilique Saint-Sauveur de Rocamadour	Rocamadour, Lot	18 March 1913
Rosary Basilica; Basilique Notre-Dame-du-Rosaire de Lourdes	Lourdes, Hautes-Pyrénées	18 July 1926
Auch Cathedral	Auch, Gers	25 April 1928
Basilica of Notre-Dame, Ceignac	Ceignac, Aveyron	12 August 1936
Basilica of Notre-Dame des Tables, Montpellier	Montpellier, Hérault	29 August 1939
Albi Cathedral	Albi, Tarn	9 May 1947
Basilica of St. Paul, Narbonne	Narbonne, Aude	29 January 1953
Basilica of St. Pius X	Lourdes, Hautes-Pyrénées	16 May 1958
Basilica of St. Germaine, Pibrac	Pibrac, Haute-Garonne	12 October 2010

== Pays de la Loire ==
Basilica of St. Nicholas, Nantes	Nantes, Loire-Atlantique	9 January 1882
Basilica of St. Donatian and St. Rogatian, Nantes	Nantes, Loire-Atlantique	14 March 1889
Basilica of Notre-Dame du Chêne, Vion ("Basilica of Our Lady of the Oak, Vion")	Vion, Sarthe	9 April 1894
Basilica of Notre-Dame d'Avesnières, Laval	Laval, Mayenne	5 March 1898
Basilica of Notre-Dame des Miracles, Mayenne	Mayenne, Mayenne	15 May 1900
Basilica of Notre-Dame, Pontmain	Pontmain, Mayenne	21 February 1905
Basilica of St. Madeleine, Angers	Angers, Maine-et-Loire	13 December 1922
Basilica of Notre-Dame de l'Épine, Évron ("Basilica of Our Lady of the Thorn, Évron")	Évron, Mayenne	7 June 1939
Basilica of St. Louis de Montfort; Basilique Saint-Louis-Marie-Grignon-de-Montfort de Saint-Laurent-sur-Sèvre	Saint-Laurent-sur-Sèvre, Vendée	5 September 1962

== Provence-Alpes-Côte d'Azur ==
Avignon Cathedral	Avignon, Vaucluse	22 December 1854
Aix Cathedral	Aix-en-Provence	6 December 1875
Basilica of Notre-Dame de la Garde, Marseille	Marseille, Bouches-du-Rhône	10 June 1879
Apt Cathedral	Apt, Vaucluse	8 August 1879
Basilica of St. Trophime; Basilique Saint-Trophime	Arles, Bouches-du-Rhône	24 January 1882
Basilica of Notre-Dame du Laus	Saint-Étienne-le-Laus, Hautes-Alpes	18 March 1892
Marseille Cathedral	Marseille, Bouches-du-Rhône	24 January 1896
Abbey of St. Victor, Marseille	Marseille, Bouches-du-Rhône	25 July 1934
Nice Cathedral	Nice, Alpes-Maritimes	27 May 1949
Basilica of Notre-Dame de l'Assomption, Nice	Nice, Alpes-Maritimes	9 January 1978
Basilica of the Immaculate Conception, Tarascon, otherwise Frigolet Abbey	Tarascon, Bouches-du-Rhône	12 June 1984
Basilica of Sacré Cœur, Marseille	Marseille, Bouches-du-Rhône	17 September 1997
Basilica of St. Michael the Archangel, Menton	Menton, Alpes-Maritimes	26 March 1999
Basilica of Notre-Dame de la Victoire, Saint-Raphaël ("Basilica of Our Lady of Victory, Saint-Raphael")	Saint-Raphaël, Var	14 January 2004
Basilica of St. Peter, Avignon	Avignon, Vaucluse	4 May 2012
Basilica of Saint Mary Magdalene, Saint-Maximin	Saint-Maximin-la-Sainte-Baume, Var	23 March 2018

== See also ==
- Basilica
- List of basilicas
- Portal:Christianity
- List of Roman Catholic basilicas

== Sources and external links ==
=== List ===
- GCatholic.org: Basilicas in France
