= List of Eastern Orthodox churches in Toronto =

The following list presents Eastern Orthodox churches in Toronto, Ontario, Canada. As of January 2010, there are 28 Orthodox churches within Toronto, 9 Mission stations, 4 Chapels, and 1 monastery, for a total of 42 canonical Orthodox sanctuaries.

The first Orthodox community established in the city of Toronto was the Greek Orthodox Community of St. George, founded in 1909, presently located on Bond Street in the heart of downtown Toronto. (Note: The first immigrant of Greek origin is reportedly Dr. Peter Constantinides who came to Toronto in 1864 to attend the Medical School at the University of Toronto. On May 21st 1909 a meeting was held at the Y.M.C.A. attended by about 200 Greeks living in Toronto. They constituted themselves into a corporate body identified as the "St. George Greek Orthodox Community of Ontario".) This was followed by Sts. Cyril and Methodius Macedono-Bulgarian Church, founded one year later in 1910, presently located on Dundas and Sackville Streets, and the Russian Orthodox Church of Christ the Saviour in 1915, of the Orthodox Church in America (OCA).

== Canonical Orthodox Churches (Note: Members of the Canadian Conference of Orthodox Bishops.) ==
=== Ecumenical Patriarchate ===
==== Greek Orthodox Metropolis of Toronto (Canada) ====
Congregation	Location	Dates	Notes	Image
St George Greek Orthodox Community	Garden District, Toronto	1909, 1937	September 15, 1897 - Dedication of Church structure founded as Holy Blossom Temple; executed in the Neo-Byzantine style.; June 19, 1938 - Consecration of St. George church by Archbishop Athenagoras, who later became Ecumenical Patriarch. (Note: "An important part can be played by the Christian church in helping to bring about a peaceful settlement of the world's problems, according to Most Rev. R. Athenagoras, of New York, head of the Greek Orthodox church in North and South America. Archbishop Athenagoras is in Toronto to officiate at the dedication tomorrow of the new Greek church on Bond St. In spite of various modernistic ideas, religion never changes, the archbishop declared. He was met at Union station by 150 representative Greeks of Toronto and vicinity. A vesper service will be held at the Bond street church tonight and the dedication service will start tomorrow at 10 a.m.") (Note: A photograph in The Globe and Mail is described as follows: "...Top centre shows a part of the procession when Most Rev. R. Athenagoras of Long Island, New York, dedicated the old Holy Blossom Synagogue, Bond Street, in the rites and to the services of the Greek Orthodox Church..."); November 10, 1976 - Heritage Property of the City of Toronto government.; 1987-1992 The church interior is unique in being the only one outside of Greece to have been painted in its entirety by the Pachomaioi monks, Theophilos and Chrysostomos, master icono painters from Mount Athos, Greece. (Note: The Pachomaioi are perhaps best known for their work on the Basilica church of Saint Demetrios, Thessalonike. They have also painted the convent church of Panaghia Malevi in Kynouria, Greece.); 2004-2013 Showcased in the annual Doors Open Toronto event.; 2009 St George Greek Orthodox Community celebrates its 100th anniversary.	
Annunciation Greek Orthodox Cathedral	Roncesvalles, Toronto	1961	1909 Church structure founded; architect was George Martell Miller (1854/5–1933) and son William J. Miller. (Note: George Martell Miller (1854/5-1933) was born in Port Hope and educated at the School of Practical Science, University of Toronto, working for Charles Walton in 1883-5. In practice on his own by 1886, he designed a number of important buildings and was also the supervising architect for the construction of Massey Hall. Many of Miller's drawings are held in the Thomas Fisher Rare Book Library, University of Toronto.); 1909-1925 North Parkdale Methodist Church.; 1925-1961 North Parkdale United Church.; 1961 Annunciation Greek Orthodox Church opened, under the Greek Community of Metropolitan Toronto.; 1963 Consecrated by Metropolitan Athenagoras (Kokkinakis) of Elaia.; 1967 Archbishop Iakovos (Coucouzis) of America raises the Annunciation Greek Orthodox Church to the rank of a Cathedral Church in the Ninth Archdiocesan District of the Archdiocese of North and South America. (Note: (in Greek) "Τῇ 14ῃ Νοεμβρίου 1967 Άγαπητοί, Μετά βαθείας πατρικῆς χαρᾶς ἀγγέλομεν ὑμῖν, ὅτι ἀνεκηρύξαμεν τόν Ἱερον Κοινοτικόν ὑμῶν Ναόν τοῦ Εὐαγγελισμοῦ τῆς Θεοτόκου, Καθεδρικόν Ναόν τῆς Θ.’ Ἀρχιεπισκοπικῆς ὑμῶν Περιφερείας. Τούτον θά καθιερώση εἰς Καθεδρικόν, ἐντός ὀλίγων ἡμερῶν, ὁ νέος Βοήθος ὑμῶν Ἐπίσκοπος ἐν τῇ ὑμετέρα Θ’ Ἀρχιεπισκοπικῇ Περιφερείᾳ, ὁ θεοφιλέστατος Ἐπίσκοπος Ἀγκῶνος κ. Θεοδόσιος. Συγχαίροντες ὑμῖν ἐπί τούτῳ, ἐκφράζομεν τήν βεβαίαν ἐλπίδα ὅτι προθύμως θά παρέχητε τῷ θεοφιλεστάτῳ Ἐπισκόπῳ ὑμῶν Ἀγκῶνος κ. Θεοδοσίῳ, πᾶσαν δυνατήν συμπαράσρασιν καί βοήθειαν εἰς ἀνάδειξην τοῦ νέου Καθεδρικοῦ ὑμῶν Ναοῦ καί δι’αὐτοῦ τῆς Ἁγίας ὑμῶν Ὀρθοδόξου Πίστεως καί Ἐκκλησίας ἐν τῇ πόλει καί Περιφερείᾳ ὑμῶν, καί διατελοῦμεν. Μετά πολλῆς ἐν Κυρίῳ ἀγαπής καί θερμῶν πατρικῶν εὐχῶν πρός πάντας Ο ΑΡΧΙΕΠΙΣΚΟΠΟΣ Ο ΑΜΕΡΙΚΗΣ ΙΑΚΩΒΟΣ"); 2000 Five-alarm fire entirely guts interior of Church.; 2002 A new Byzantine-style church is opened within the old Romanesque building. (Note: The exquisite Byzantine Icons in the Altar were painted by the master icon painter Father Theodore Koufos, while the Baroque wooden iconostasis, Altar Table, Cantor’s Stand and Bishop’s Throne were hand-carved by Master Wood Sculptor Stylianos Kavroulakis of Crete. The Cathedral holds over 850 seated worshippers, and has parking facilities for 50 cars.); 2006 Odyssey Montessori School - Sorauren Campus is established.; 2011 Annunciation Greek Orthodox Cathedral celebrates its 50th anniversary.	
St Demetrios Greek Orthodox Church	Thorncliffe Park	1962	1962 Saint Demetrios Greek Orthodox Church and the attached Polymenakion Cultural Centre built.; The Cultural centre provides: head offices for GCT; an office for the priest and the church administrators; classrooms for Sunday school students; and multipurpose workshops for extra-curricular, cultural and religious activities.; 1975 Painting of the church was completed by Mr. G. Papastamatiou.; Living Orthodoxy. (Adult Religious Education ministry of St Demetrios Greek Orthodox Church).	
All Saints Greek Orthodox Community	Bayview Village	1963, 1966	1963 North Toronto Greek Orthodox Parish (operating as All Saints Greek Orthodox Church) is founded, the first in the city of North York.; 1966 First service celebrated in its new building in March 1966.; First Greek Church in Ontario to conduct its services in both Greek and English.	
St. Nicholas Greek Orthodox Community	L'Amoreaux	1971, 1983	May 15, 1994 - St. Nicholas was consecrated by His Eminence Metropolitan Archbishop Sotirios of Toronto (Canada).; May 31, 1998 - His All Holiness Ecumenical Patriarch Bartholomew I of Constantinople blessed this church during his historic visit to Toronto. (Note: Patriarch Bartholomew visited Toronto May 30–31, 1998 as part of his first-ever visit to Canada.)	
Holy Trinity-Panagia Grigoroussa Greek Orthodox Community	Palmerston-Little Italy	1972	1896-1928 Clinton Street Methodist Church. (Note: Merged with West United Church in 1928, then became the home of Dewi Sant Welsh United Church.); Pre-1972 The church building on Clinton St. belonged to a Greek Old Calendarist jurisdiction. An Athonite Hieromonk, Fr. Paisios, was its priest there when the parish was transferred to the Greek Orthodox Metropolis of Toronto in 1972.; 1972 Holy Trinity Greek Orthodox Community is founded. The first priest was Fr. Constantine Zachos.	
Sts. Constantine and Helen Greek Orthodox Community	Amesbury, Toronto	1972	2000 Expansion project begun, both internal and external, completed by October 2001.	
St. Irene Chrysovalantou Greek Orthodox Church	Greektown, Toronto	1975	1975 The first service was conducted on June 1, under the spiritual direction of Fr. Dorotheos and Fr. Chris Chronopoulos, priests remembered for encouraging children of Greek migrants to maintain their Greek culture, heritage and identity.; 1986 St. Irene became the final church (of 4 churches) to join the Greek Community of Toronto.; 2003 Construction began to create a domed roof along with traditional Orthodox architecture, under the tutelage of Fr. Pavlos Koumarianos.	
St. John the Baptist Greek Orthodox Church	Wexford, Toronto	1981	Greek Community of Metropolitan Toronto; 1991 Church damaged by a $1.2-million fire on the eve of its 10th anniversary. (Note: The building itself houses: The Youth Centre "Megas Alexandros"; The offices for the Church; Offices for the Greek Community Social Services; Offices for Olympic Flame Soccer club; A multi-purpose room; The Church, with a seating capacity of 450, and room to accommodate an additional 400 people on major feast days.); A group of ten Russian Orthodox icon painters were responsible for the art in the rebuilt church.	
Metamorphosis Greek Orthodox Church	East Danforth	1985	1923-1925 Donlands Methodist Church. (Note: United Church, located at 40 Donlands Avenue in Toronto, was established in 1925, formerly Methodist. It began a portable mission at Langford and Danforth Avenues in 1914. The church relocated to corner of Donlands Avenue and Strathmore Blvd. in 1923. It joined the United Church of Canada in 1925. In 1984 it amalgamated with Eastminster United Church in the Eastminster building.); 1925-1984 Donlands United Church.; 1985 Metamorphosis Greek Orthodox Church is founded, August 20.	
St. John the Theologian Greek Orthodox Church	Thorncliffe Park	1998	Toronto Orthodox Theological Academy	
Lifegiving Font Greek Orthodox Chapel	Thorncliffe Park	1998	Chapel - Toronto Orthodox Theological Academy.	
Sts. Anargyroi Hellenic Home Chapel	Bracondale Hill		Chapel - Old Age Home	
Sts. Cyril and Methodios Hellenic Home Chapel	Dorset Park	2004, 2010	Chapel - Old Age Home; May 10, 2010 - Consecration of Chapel.	
The Three Hierarchs Greek Orthodox Chapel	Don Mills		Chapel - Metamorphosis Greek Orthodox School	

==== Ukrainian Orthodox Church of Canada (UOCC) ====
(Diocese: Toronto and the Eastern Eparchy)

Congregation	Location	Dates	Notes	Image
St. Volodymyr's Ukrainian Orthodox Cathedral (Toronto)	Kensington Market	1926 (Note: At a meeting, held at the Ukrainian Peoples’ Home on October 31, 1926, the decision was made to lay the foundation for the parish.); 1935 (Note: In 1935, the congregation bought the site at 400 Bathurst St. on which to erect a church. But for their immediate needs, the Congregation acquired a large building at 404 Bathurst.); 1948 (Note: The new church was officially opened and named St. Vladimir’s Church.)	1951 The church was chosen as the see for the ruling Archbishop of Toronto and Eastern Canada, and was elevated to the rank of a Cathedral.; 1952 The Iconostasis of the cathedral was installed, designed by the architect G. Kodak; the icons were painted by three artists — W. Balas, M. Dmytrenko, and I. Kubarsky, assisted by Petro Sydorenko, in the ‘Cossack Baroque’ style, which is traditional and typical of the interiors in many Ukrainian churches.; 1988 As part of the celebration of the Millennium of Christianity in Ukraine, the cathedral was renamed St. Volodymyr Ukrainian Orthodox Cathedral.; 2004 Showcased in the annual Doors Open Toronto event.	
St. Andrew Parish	Junction Triangle	1950		
St. Demetrius Sobor	Long Branch, Toronto	1958		
Ukrainian Orthodox Church of St. Anne	Highland Creek, Toronto	1958		

==== American Carpatho-Russian Orthodox Diocese (ACROD) ====
Congregation	Location	Dates	Notes	Image
St. Euphrosynia of Polotsk Belarusian-Greek Orthodox Church	Dovercourt-Wallace Emerson-Junction	1950, 1953, 1957	1950 The first Liturgy and prayers were held at the first location, on 23 March. Fr. Mikhail Mihai celebrated the Liturgy, a Greek Orthodox priest of Belarusian origin.; 1952 In October the parish was officially recognized by the Ecumenical Patriarch's Exarch for North America.; 1953 The parish, supported by the Belarusian National Association in Canada (BNA), bought a five-room house at 11 Cunningham Avenue. On 28 June the first Liturgy was celebrated there.; 1957 First Liturgy in the new church at 1008 Dovercourt Rd (bought in 1956) is celebrated on 4 August 1957, under Very Rev. V. Sahaidakivskyi.; 1966 Church was renovated and a church hall was built. Fr. V. Sahaidakivskyi supervised the acquisition of nearly twenty icons from the Iablochynski Belarusian Greek Orthodox Monastery in the western Belastok Region.; 1970 Parish celebrated 20th anniversary on 31 May, with Greek Orthodox Bishop Theodosius celebrating with Archimandrite I. Strok, the parish priest and four other Greek Orthodox priests.; 1975 Parish celebrated 25th anniversary on 12 October, with Greek Orthodox Bishop Sotirios in attendance with the Very Rev. P. Veliki, parish priest.; 2008 Church is transferred from Greek-Orthodox Diocese of Toronto to the American Carpatho-Russian Orthodox Diocese.	
St. John the Compassionate Mission	Riverdale, Toronto	1986	Mission; In 1986, St. John the Compassionate Mission was erected as mission-parish of the Ukrainian Catholic church by Bishop Isidore Borecky, to serve any one in the city in need of spiritual or material help.; In 2001, under Bishop Cornelius Pasichny, it was released and received by Metropolitan Nicholas (Smisko) as an Apostolate of the Carpatho-Russian Diocese of the Ecumenical Patriarchate.; It serves all ages and all people in need regardless of background. Youth Summer camps are operated by the mission in co-operation with St Mary of Egypt Refuge. All liturgical services at the mission are offered in English. Its doors are open six day a week.	
St. Silouan The Athonite Orthodox Church	Regent Park / Riverdale, Toronto	2002	English / Multicultural Parish with over 9 languages spoken; Operates liturgical worship, hospitality program to those in need in the local community, educational programs, child education (Montessori based Cateishm of the Good Shephard), youth and family programs.; Colocated and partnered with St. John the Compassionate Mission until 2018.; Since 2018, it is located on the lower level of St. Cyril & Methody Macedono-Bulgarian Eastern Orthodox Cathedral.	St Silouan parish community group photo
St. Zoticos Orthodox Mission	Scarborough Village	2018	English / Multicultural Mission; Along with Scarborough Good Neighbours Drop In, it seeks to live out in the everyday the beauty of the gospel. We are centered on the liturgy as the presence of Christ among the people of Scarborough. All services are mostly in English.; Ministry of St John the Compassionate Mission in Toronto	

=== Bulgarian Eastern Orthodox Diocese of the USA, Canada, and Australia ===
Congregation	Location	Dates	Notes	Image
St. Cyril & Methody Macedono-Bulgarian Eastern Orthodox Cathedral	Regent Park	1910, 1948	Founded by Macedonian and Bulgarian immigrants, the church was originally located on Front St. and Eastern Ave.; May 24, 1911 - Consecration of the Church by Russian Abp. Platon (Rozhdestvensky) of New York and Hieromonak Theophilact.; May 24, 1948 - Laying of the cornerstone of the new Church on Sackville Street.; 2010 Cathedral celebrated its Centennial Jubilee.	
St. George Macedono-Bulgarian Eastern Orthodox Church	Regent Park	1941	Founded by Macedonian immigrants as a result of a dispute with the parish of St. Cyril & Methody Macedono-Bulgarian Eastern Orthodox Cathedral; This church was part of the Orthodox Church of America until 2011 when its parish voted in favor of joining the Bulgarian Orthodox Church	
Holy Trinity Macedono-Bulgarian Eastern Orthodox Church	East Danforth	1972 (Note: "In 1972 the Sveta Troica (Holy Trinity) Macedono-Bulgarian Eastern Orthodox Church was established in Toronto, mostly for political reasons. Many members belonged to the Bulgarian National Front (BNF) and the Macedonian Patriotic Organization (MPO) and firmly believe that Slavic Macedonians are part of the Bulgarian nationality. The parish was initially within the Bulgarian diocese of the Orthodox Church in America, during the late 1970s within the Russian Church Abroad, and since 1982 under the Holy Synod in Bulgaria. It has about 150 members and is strongly committed to promoting Bulgarian identity and language.")	1973-1981 Father Vassil Mihailoff was the parish priest of Holy Trinity until his death in 1981.; 1976 The church structure at 201 Monarch Park Ave, which was previously the Anglican Church of the Nativity, was purchased from the Anglican Church in Canada.; 1988 An Ontario Supreme Court judge ruled that the church had been "wrongfully operated" for more than six years by the Synod of the Bulgarian Eastern Orthodox Church in Sofia, when it should properly have been under the jurisdiction of the "Church in Exile."; 1996 Large reproductions of frescoes with scenes from Bulgarian religious history were commissioned.; 2007-2013 Major renovations of the church hall and facilities were undertaken.	

=== Macedonian Orthodox Church - Ohrid Archbishopric ===
Congregation	Location	Dates	Notes	Image
St. Clement of Ohrid Macedonian Orthodox Cathedral	Thorncliffe Park 76 Overlea Blvd, Toronto, Ontario M4H 1C5	1964		

=== Orthodox Church in America (OCA) ===
==== OCA - Archdiocese of Canada ====
Congregation	Location	Dates	Notes	Image
Christ the Savior Russian Orthodox Church	Seaton Village	1915, 1930, 1966	Both Slavonic and English Services for primarily Russian community; 1907 Church structure founded, designed by architect Robert Balmer McGiffin.; 1907-1966 St. Cyprian's Anglican Church.; 1915 Christ the Saviour Russian Orthodox church is founded by the first Russian immigrants in Toronto, with the blessing of the North American Metropolia Abp. Evdokim (Meschersky).; March 9, 1941 - Fr. John Diachina, one of the most remarkable priests in North America, was appointed a rector.; 1952 Christ the Saviour Church is raised to the rank of a Cathedral by the new bishop of Toronto and Canada Bp. Nikon De Greve.; 1960 Funeral of Grand Duchess Olga Alexandrovna of Russia at this parish.; June 1, 1966 - the parish of Christ the Saviour acquired the building on Manning Avenue, and on October 30, a solemn blessing sanctification of the temple was held by Metr. Irenaeus and the newly appointed Abp. of Canada Sylvester, con-celebrating with a multitude of clergy.; Count George Ignatieff, representative of Canada in the United Nations (1966-1969), and father of Michael Ignatieff, a former Leader of the Liberal party of Canada, was a parishioner of Christ the Saviour Cathedral.; 2002-2011 Rector of the temple was Archpriest Oleg Kirillow, who had served for over 10 years in Moscow; Fr Oleg put a lot of effort into renovating the church and growing the parish and church school.	
Holy Myrrhbearers Orthodox Mission	University of Toronto, St George Campus	2015	English Language Mission located on Campus; Affiliation with Orthodox School of Theology at Trinity College; Has Orthodox Burial Society and Lay Pastoral Visitation Program in addition to Campus Ministry; Worship:Trinity College Chapel	
St. Tikhon Podvoriye	Wilson Heights, Toronto	2001	Russian / Slavonic Language parish; Transferred to Moscow Patriarch as a Representational Church	
St. Seraphim of Sarov Church	Richmond Hill	2000, 2006	Russian / Slavonic Language parish. Located in the anciliar chapel of Saint Mary's Anglican Church; Worship: 10030 Yonge St, Richmond Hill, ON L4C 1T8.	

==== OCA - Romanian Episcopate ====
Congregation	Location	Dates	Notes	Image
St. George Church	Keelesdale-Eglinton West	1954		
St. John the Evangelist Church	Vaughan	1999	Worship: 9520 Jane St., Vaughan, ON, L6A 1S1	

=== Russian Orthodox Church Outside Russia (ROCOR) ===
(Diocese: The Montreal and Canada Diocese)

Congregation	Location	Dates	Notes	Image
Holy Trinity Cathedral	Grange Park	1949, (Note: On November 2, 1949, Archbishop Joasaph of Edmonton, representing the synod of bishops of the Russian Orthodox church outside of Russia, appointed Father Mathew Andrushenko as rector of the new parish. Reminiscent of the early days of Christianity, the small community gathered in a rented loft above a laundry on Parliament Street near Queen. Here they brought beautiful icons and began holding services. The very first took place on December 15, 1949 with Father Mathew. Eleven people were present at that service.); 1953, (Note: A small church was built by the hands of the first parishioners on Richmond Street just west of Berkeley, in Cabbagetown. It was begun in the autumn of 1952 and was consecrated on September 6, 1953, by Archbishop Vitaly.); 1966	1922 The structure at 23 Henry Street was founded as Beth Jacob Synagogue on August 20, 1922; the architect was Benjamin Brown (Brow), of Toronto. (Note: The Beth Jacob Synagogue was the first synagogue to be built by a Jewish architect in the city. One of the founders of the synagogue was Samuel Tepperman (d. March 1, 1960).); 1951 The parish has had about 50 families in 1951. By the end of 1952, there were about 70 parish families.; June 1966 - the parish bought the large synagogue at 23 Henry St and began a complete renovation of the structure, completed in the Spring of 1967.; November 16, 1969 - consecration of the temple by Abp. Vitaly of Montreal and Canada (later Metropolitan and First Hierarch of ROCOR).; 1973 Heritage Property of the City of Toronto (June 20, 1973).; October 26, 2008 - Hierarchical Liturgy with Bp. Hilarion Alfeyev of Vienna and Austria presiding. (Note: Bishop Hilarion Alfeyev later became the Archbishop of Volokolamsk, and chairman of the Department of External Church Relations (DECR) of the Russian Orthodox Church).); November 22, 2012 - Mitred Protopresbyter Vladimir Malchenko is honoured with the Queen Elizabeth II Diamond 60th Jubilee Medal, on behalf of the Governor General of Canada, in recognition of his role as an eminent social and ecclesiastical figure who has greatly contributed to the life of the Russian community in Canada.; September 4–8, 2013 - ceremonies were held dedicated to the 400th anniversary of the House of Romanovs, headed by Metropolitan Hilarion (Kapral) of Eastern America and New York, First Hierarch of the ROCOR.; November 24, 2019 - Holy Trinity Cathedral celebrated its 70th anniversary.	
Holy Resurrection Church	Oakwood-Vaughan		This church is a continuing church of the Russian Orthodox Church Abroad.	

=== Patriarchal Representation of the Russian Orthodox Church in Toronto ===
Congregation	Location	Dates	Notes	Image
Parish of St. Tikhon	Clanton Park		From 1995 to 2009, the location at 275 Wilson Heights Blvd. belonged to the Old Calendarist Saint Joseph of Arimathea Orthodox Church.	

=== Serbian Orthodox Diocese of Canada ===
Congregation	Location	Dates	Notes	Image
Saint Sava Serbian Orthodox Church	Cabbagetown, Toronto	1955	Bishop (Saint) Nikolaj Velimirović blessed the Church Hall on September 5, 1954.; The Church was completed and consecrated on May 22, 1955, by Bishop Dionisije; Princess Olga (sister of Russian Emperor Nicholas II) attended the celebration and banquet, donating an icon of St. Alexander Nevski made by her own hand.	

=== Romanian Orthodox Archdiocese in the Americas ===
Congregation	Location	Dates	Notes	Image
All Saints Romanian Orthodox Church	Oakridge, Toronto			
St. Dumitru / Three Hierarchs Romanian Orthodox Mission	Don Valley Village		Mission	
Holy Cross Orthodox Monastery	Amesbury, Toronto	2007	Monastery; Currently uses an Anglican / Episcopalian rectory, with plans to establish themselves in the countryside outside of Toronto.	

=== Georgian Orthodox Diocese of America and Canada ===
Congregation	Location	Dates	Notes	Image
Saint Iveron Icon of the Mother of God Georgian Orthodox Church	Wexford, Toronto	2010	Worship: St. Jude Anglican Church	

=== Antiochian Orthodox Christian Archdiocese of North America ===
Congregation	Location	Dates	Notes	Image
Saint George Antiochian Orthodox Church	Richmond Hill, Ontario	1951	Worships in Arabic and English; Current Temple was constructed 1986	

== Not members of the Canadian Conference of Orthodox Bishops ==
=== Old Calendar Jurisdictions or Traditional Orthodox Churches (Note: The Old Calendar schism occurred in 1935, when three bishops (Germanos of Demetrias, the former Metropolitan of Florina, Chrysostom (Kavouridis), and Chrysostomos (Demetriou) of Zakynthos) declared their separation from the official Church of Greece stating that the calendar change that had been implemented in 1924 was a schismatic act. Greek Old Calendarist groups maintain that they have not separated over a mere calendar, rather that the calendar is a symptom of what has been called "the pan-heresy of ecumenism.") ===
==== Metropolitan Bishop Akakios (Ntouskos) of Canada ====
Congregation	Location	Dates	Notes	Image
Saint Anargyroi Old Calendar Greek Church	Leslieville, Toronto 281 Jones Avenue, Toronto, Ontario M4M 3A7		Bishop Akakios also has churches in Montreal (Annunciation of the Holy Mother) and Laval (St. Irene Chrysovalantou).	

==== Metropolis of the Genuine Greek Orthodox Church (GOC) of America ====
(Florinite, 1937-)
(Holy Metropolis of Toronto, under Metropolitan Moses) (Note: See also: Parish Directory. Holy Metropolis of the G.O.C. of America.; NORTH AMERICAN EPARCHIAL SYNOD. Genuine Greek Orthodox Church of America (Toronto Church website).)
- (A Metropolis of the Genuine Orthodox Church of Greece, under Archbishop Kallinikos of Athens and All Greece (2010-present))

Congregation	Location	Dates	Notes	Image
Saint Nektarios Greek Orthodox Cathedral	Davenport, Toronto 1223 Dovercourt Road, Toronto, Ontario M6H 2Y1		2011 Up until the Spring of 2011, this parish was part of the Holy Orthodox Church in North America (HOCNA), Metropolis of Toronto.; Services in Greek and English	
Saint Joseph of Arimathea Orthodox Church	Pickering 510 Whitevale Rd, Pickering, Ontario L0H 1M0	1985, 1995, 2010	2011 Up until the Spring of 2011, this parish was part of the Holy Orthodox Church in North America (HOCNA), Metropolis of Toronto.; Services in English	
Orthodox Church of the Mother of God of Prusa	Corktown, Toronto 461 Richmond Street E., Toronto, Ontario M5A 1R1		1953 The structure at 461 Richmond Street E. was founded in 1953 as the Holy Trinity Russian Orthodox Church (ROCOR), which later moved to 23 Henry St.; 2011 Up until the Spring of 2011, this parish was part of the Holy Orthodox Church in North America (HOCNA), Metropolis of Toronto.; Services in Greek	
St. Dunstan Orthodox Mission	Swansea 360 Windermere Avenue, Toronto, Ontario M6S 3L4		Mission	
Greek Orthodox Church of the Holy Martyrs Raphael, Nicholas, and Irene	Old East York 230 Glebemount Avenue Toronto, Ontario M4C 3T4		2014 The Holy Synod in Resistance, of which this parish was a part (under the Archdiocese of Etna (California)), united itself to the Church of the Genuine Orthodox Christians of Greece and formally ceased to exist.	

==== True Orthodox Church of Greece ("Makarian (Lamian) Synod") ====
(Florinite, 1995-)
(True Orthodox Church of Greece under Archbishop Makarios of Athens and All Greece (2004-present))

Congregation	Location	Dates	Notes	Image
St Kosmas Aitolos Greek Orthodox Church (Note: See: Parishes and Monasteries abroad. Confessor (Unofficial site).)	O'Connor–Parkview 2815 St Clair Ave E., Toronto, ON M4B 1N3		Until 1995, this church was a part of the main Old Calendar ("Florinite") Church of Greece - the Church of the Genuine Orthodox Christians of Greece - under Archbishop Chrysostom (Kiousis) of Athens and All Greece (+2010). (Note: In 1995, a resistance faction of six bishops formed within the Old Calendar Florinte Synod of Archbishop Chrysostom (Kiousis) (Church of the Genuine Orthodox Christians of Greece) and separated itself over what they claimed to be a series of canonical infractions, headed by Metropolitan Kallinikos (Hatzis) of Lamia. By early 1997, the movement had fragmented into three groups, one of which reconciled with Archbishop Chrysostom (Kiousis). A second group, led by Paisios Loulourgas (Met. of America) and Vikentios Malamatenios (titular Bp. of Avlona), submitted to the Ecumenical Patriarchate (in 1998). Later in 1997, Kallinikos of Lamia and Euthymios of Thessaloniki proceeded to ordain five titular bishops in an attempt to create a new synod; in 2003, they finally decided to elect a primate, and elected Makarios (Kavakides) of Athens.)	

==== Matthewite True Orthodox Christians in the United States ====
(Matthewite) (Note: The first Primate of Athens selected by the Matthewites was Agathangelos of Athens in 1958, who reposed in 1967. His successor was Archbishop Andreas of Athens who was elected to the primacy in 1972, retiring in 2003 (+2005). In 2003 Archbishop Nicholas of Athens was elected, considered by many to have a progressive vision for the Matthewite church.)
(Genuine Orthodox Church of Greece, under Archbishop Nicholas of Athens and All Greece)

Congregation	Location	Dates	Notes	Image
Church of the Exaltation of the Holy Cross	Scarborough Junction 618 Birchmount Road, Toronto, Ontario M1K 1P9		Matthewite Old Calendar Synod.	

=== Unrecognized Independent Churches ===
==== Belarusian Autocephalous Orthodox Church ====
Congregation	Location	Dates	Notes	Image
St. Cyril of Turov Parish	Dovercourt-Wallace Emerson-Junction 524 St. Clarens Ave, Toronto, Ontario M6H 3W7	1954, 1959		

==== Free Serbian Orthodox Church ====
Congregation	Location	Dates	Notes	Image
Saint Michael the Archangel Serbian Orthodox Church	Dovercourt Park 212 Delaware Avenue, Toronto, Ontario M6H 2T7	1964 (Note: Built in 1889, as a 19th century Anglican church, it has been the Serbian community's downtown-Toronto local church since the 1960s.); 2005 (Note: This was a recent architectural project (2002-2005), to partially demolish, totally renovate, and add to, an existing 500 sm, circa 1890, church, in order to create a 1,700 sm/18,000 sf, universally-accessible, barrier-free, 4-storey, single-aisled, basilica and community centre. Stylistically, the building synthesizes Serbian late-Byzantine architectural-styles and icon styles. It has many copper domes, cupolas, and trim; and great lighting & wood panels.); 2010 (Note: As a result of an internal conflict ca.late 2009/early 2010, this parish was transferred out of the Serbian Orthodox Diocese of Canada , and placed under the Archdiocese of Etna (California) . The first Liturgy under the new jurisdiction was on Sunday April 11, 2010.); 2014 (Note: Transfers to the Metropolis of the Genuine Greek Orthodox Church (GOC) of America.)	1889 Church structure built as a 19th-century Anglican church.; 2008 Showcased in the annual Doors Open Toronto event.; 2014 The Holy Synod in Resistance, of which this parish was a part from 2010 to 2014 (under the Archdiocese of Etna (California)), united itself to the Church of the Genuine Orthodox Christians of Greece and formally ceased to exist.; 2014 The parish celebrated its 50th anniversary (1964-2014)	

== See also ==
Toronto Church Lists

- List of Anglican churches in Toronto
- List of Presbyterian churches in Toronto
- List of Roman Catholic churches in Toronto
- List of United Church of Canada churches in Toronto
- List of Synagogues in Toronto

Other Church Lists

- List of Coptic Orthodox Churches in Canada (Non-Chalcedonian)
- List of Greek Orthodox churches in the United States

General

- Byzantine Rite Christianity in Canada
- Timeline of Eastern Orthodoxy in America
- List of cemeteries in Toronto
