= Ferchaud =

Ferchaud may refer to:

- Martigné-Ferchaud
- Claire Ferchaud
