= Trichet =

Trichet is a French surname. Notable people with the surname include:

- Jean-Claude Trichet (born 1942), French banker
- Marie Louise Trichet (1684–1759), French Catholic sister
