= Chrysostomos II =

Chrysostomos II (Greek: Χρυσόστομος Β΄) may refer to:

- Chrysostomos II of Athens (1880–1968), Archbishop of Athens and All Greece in 1962–1967
- Chrysostomos II of Cyprus (1941–2022), Archbishop of Cyprus in 2006–2022
- Chrysostomos II Kioussis (1920–2010), Archbishop of Athens and All Greece of a Greek Old Calendarist group in 1986–2010
