= Daughters of Wisdom =

Women's Catholic religious institute

- Filles de la Sagesse
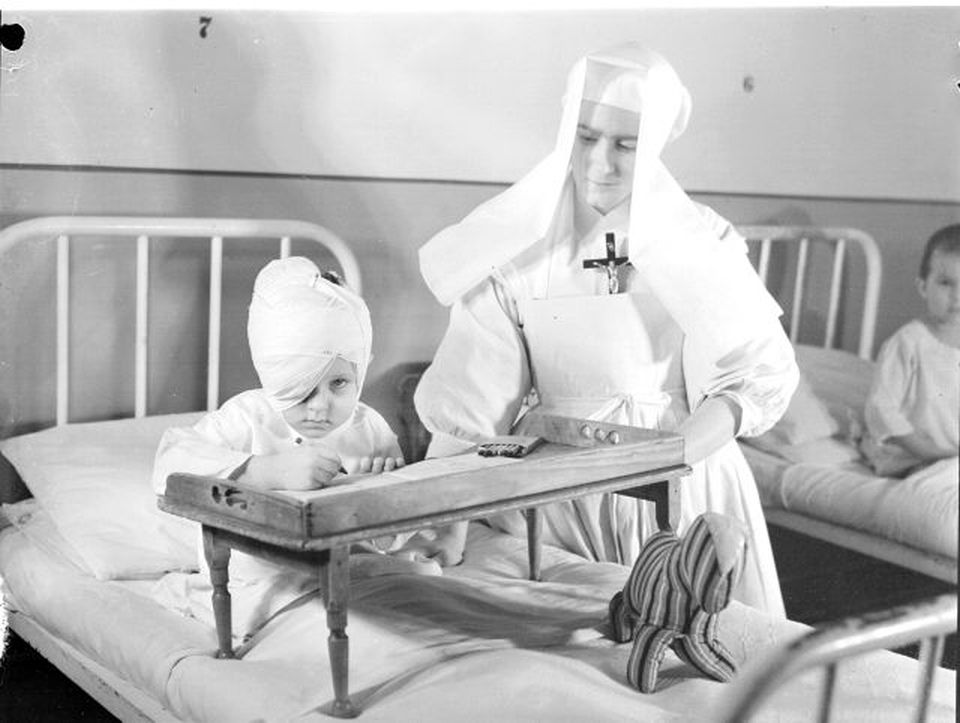
- A member of the Daughters of Wisdom caring for an injured child at Sainte-Justine Hospital in Montreal, 1945
- Abbreviation: F.d.L.S.
- Formation: 1703; 323 years ago
- Founder: Blessed Sr. Marie Louise Trichet, F.d.L.S.; Saint Fr. Louis-Marie Grignion de Montfort, S.M.M.
- Type: Centralized Religious Institute of Consecrated Life of Pontifical Right for women
- Headquarters: Via dei Casali di Torrevecchia, 16, Rome, Italy
- Members: 1,057 members as of 2020
- Superior General: Sr. Louise Madore, F.d.L.S.
- Main organ: Marie Louise Trichet
- Parent organization: Catholic Church
- Website: daughtersofwisdom.org

The Daughters of Wisdom is a Catholic religious institute of women founded by Louis de Montfort and Marie Louise Trichet in 1703 to serve those in need.

== History ==
In 1703, when he was temporary chaplain of the hospital of Poitiers, Louis de Montfort assembled some pious young women into a small community, and gave them a rule to live by. Its main points have been retained in the Rule of the Daughters of Wisdom. The congregation strives to acquire heavenly wisdom by imitating the Incarnate Wisdom, Jesus Christ.

When St Louis died in 1716, the community numbered only four sisters, led by Blessed Marie Louise Trichet who had met Louis de Montfort in 1701 and became known as the "First Daughter of Wisdom" when she offered her services to the hospital. Her mother is said to have told her: "You will become as mad as that priest". There followed a forty-three year career during which she nursed the sick, gave food to beggars and administered the great maritime hospital of France. The poor people of the Hospital of Niort (Deux-Sèvres) called her "good Mother Jesus". In 1714, she was joined by Catherine Brunet.

In 1715, at the request of the Bishop of La Rochelle, the sisters moved to that city. Henceforth the congregation undertook both care of the sick and teaching. Sister Marie-Louise was superior of the congregation. On 22 August 1715, Montfort gave the habit of Wisdom to Sister Ste Croix and Sister Incarnation. In 1720 the site of their mother-house was acquired at Saint-Laurent-sur-Sèvre. Henceforth the life of Marie-Louise was to be a series of travels necessitated by new foundations and by visits to all her communities; in 1750 there were already thirty. She died on 27 April 1759.

By the time of the French Revolution, the sisters numbered 700. During the Revolutionary era, they were severely persecuted and imprisoned. Two sisters were guillotined at Nantes; and another two, Sisters Véronique and Jouin, at Rennes. Under Napoleon, the community regained most of their former houses and were granted 30,000 francs for building purposes. It was in 1810, when Napoleon was temporarily the master of Europe, that, at his call, the Daughters of Wisdom left French soil for the first time to nurse wounded soldiers at Antwerp. Numerous medals were bestowed on the congregation by Napoleon, and by every French Government since; Spain, Prussia, and Belgium have honoured them for nursing the wounded or plague-stricken soldiers of those countries; as a congregation they have been acknowledged in the Apostolic Brief of Pope Leo XII in 1825; they were canonically approved, together with the Fathers of the Company of Mary, in 1853; they were placed under Cardinal Vincenzo Vannutelli as protector, and favoured by two important decrees in 1893 and 1898 securing the integrity of Montfort's institution; and they received the definitive approbation of the constitutions of Montfort's double foundation in 1904.

Since then the Daughters of Wisdom has grown to a multinational organisation with houses across the world.

== See also ==
- Blessed Marie Louise Trichet
