= Basilica of St. Louis de Montfort =

Basilica in Saint-Laurent-sur-Sèvre, France

Coordinates: 46°57′34″N 0°53′30″W

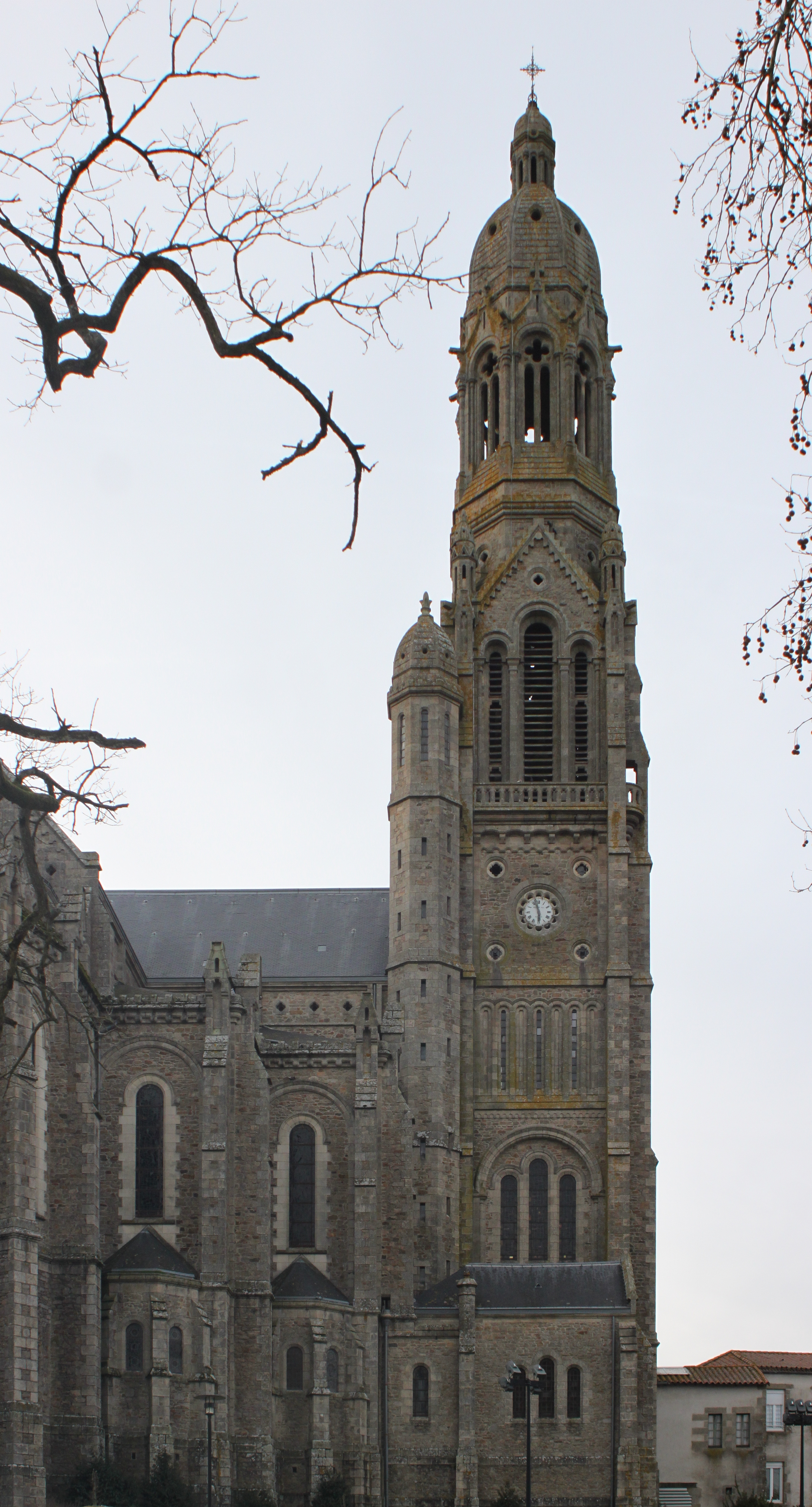

The Basilica of St. Louis de Montfort is a Roman Catholic basilica at Saint-Laurent-sur-Sèvre in the Vendée department, in the Pays de la Loire region in France.

Thousands of pilgrim arrive at the basilica each year for it is the burial place of two well known Roman Catholic figures: Saint Louis de Montfort and Blessed Marie Louise Trichet.

On September 19, 1996, Pope John-Paul II visited the basilica to meditate and pray on the adjacent tombs of Saint Louis and Blessed Marie Louise, after issuing his Apostolic Letter Rosarium Virginis Mariae that singled out Saint Louis de Montfort as an example of Mariology in the French school of spirituality.

== Sources ==
- Saint-Laurent-sur-Sèvre official website
