= Wexford, Toronto =

Wexford
- Neighbourhood
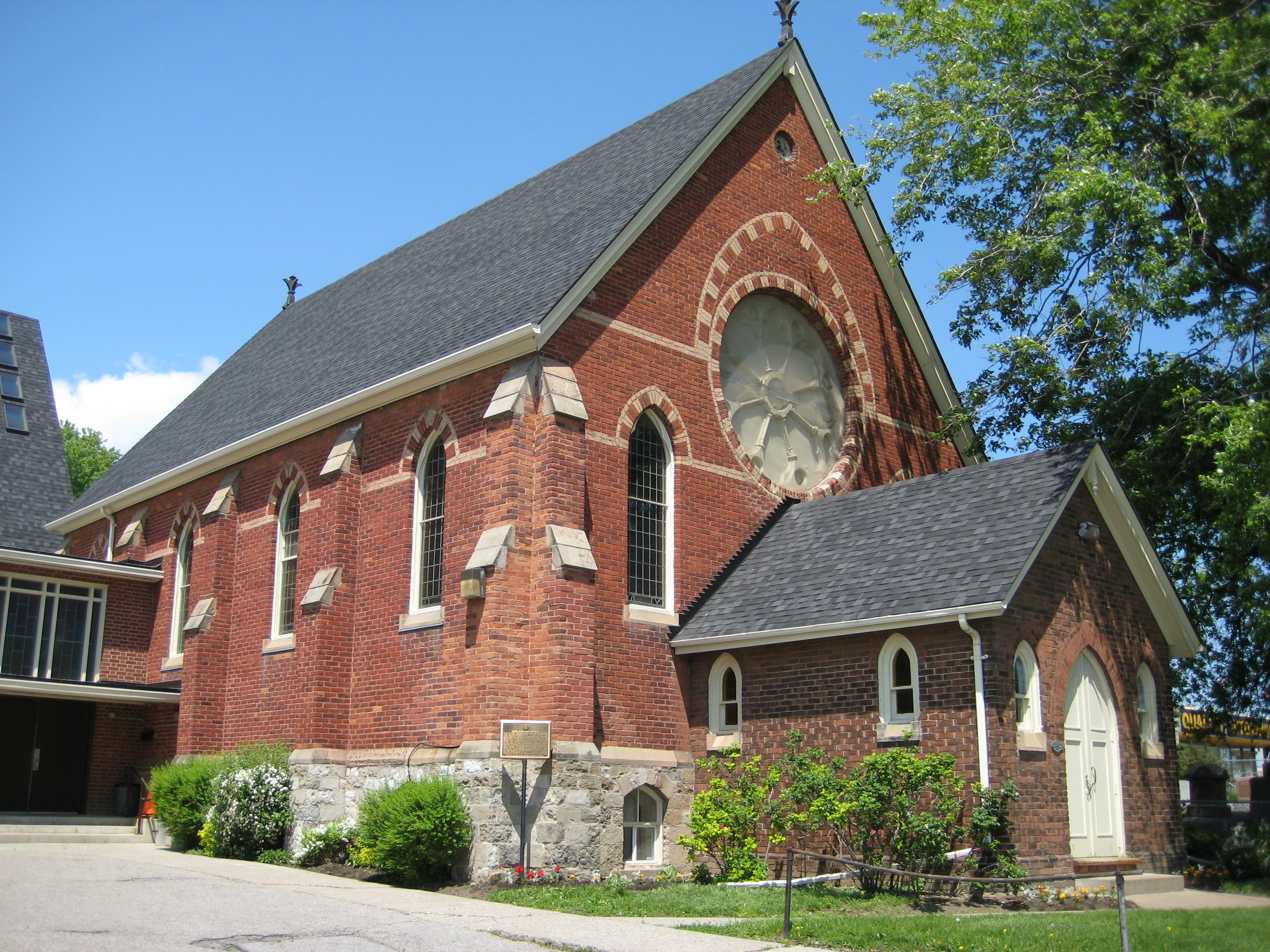
- Wexford Heights United Church in Wexford

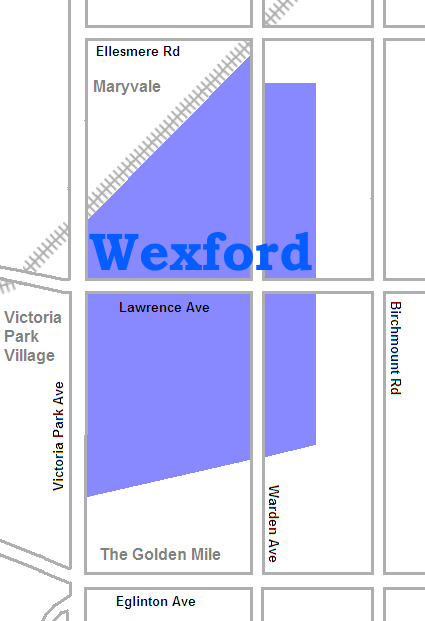
- Coordinates: 43°44′35″N 79°18′16″W
- Country: Canada
- Province: Ontario
- City: Toronto
- Established: 1850 Scarborough Township
- Changed municipality: 1998 Toronto from City of Scarborough

Government
  - MP: Salma Zahid (Scarborough Centre)
  - MPP: Brad Duguid (Scarborough Centre)
  - Councillor: Michael Thompson (Ward 37 Scarborough Centre)

Wexford is a neighbourhood in Toronto, Ontario, Canada. It is located in the eastern part of the city, on the western end of the district of Scarborough, spanning Lawrence Avenue East between Victoria Park Avenue and Birchmount Road. There are many persons of Greek heritage in this neighbourhood. The Wexford Heights Business Improvement Area boasts 245 members and hosts an annual street festival on Lawrence. Wexford is named for County Wexford, Ireland.

== History ==
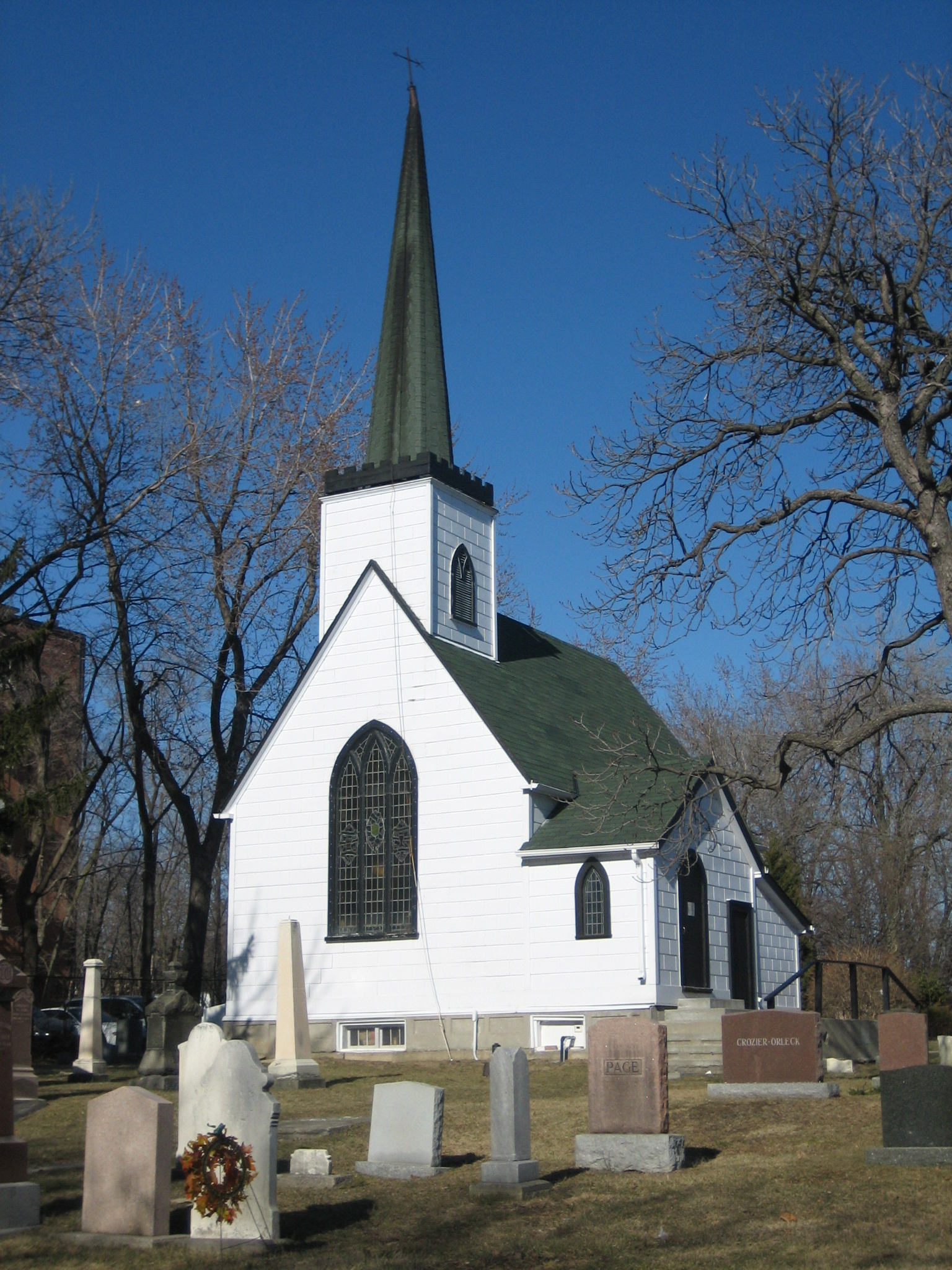
The Church of St. Jude was built in 1848.

The Church of St. Jude was erected in Wexford in 1848. It was once the Anglican church to the small village of Wexford, and survives today as a landmark in the modern urban area.

In 1953, Wexford, along with the rest of Scarborough, was severed from York County, forming the regional government of Metropolitan Toronto. The area consists of mostly post-World War II type bungalow housing, apartments, retail and commercial space. The city was merged with the rest of Scarborough and the five other municipalities of Metropolitan Toronto, forming the new "City of Toronto" in 1998.

According to the 2006 Census Visible Minorities comprised 45.4% of the total population, the largest minority group being South Asian at 12.0%.

A 2013 article in the Toronto LIFE magazine ranks Wexford-Maryvale 6th out of Toronto's 140 neighbourhoods.

== Education ==
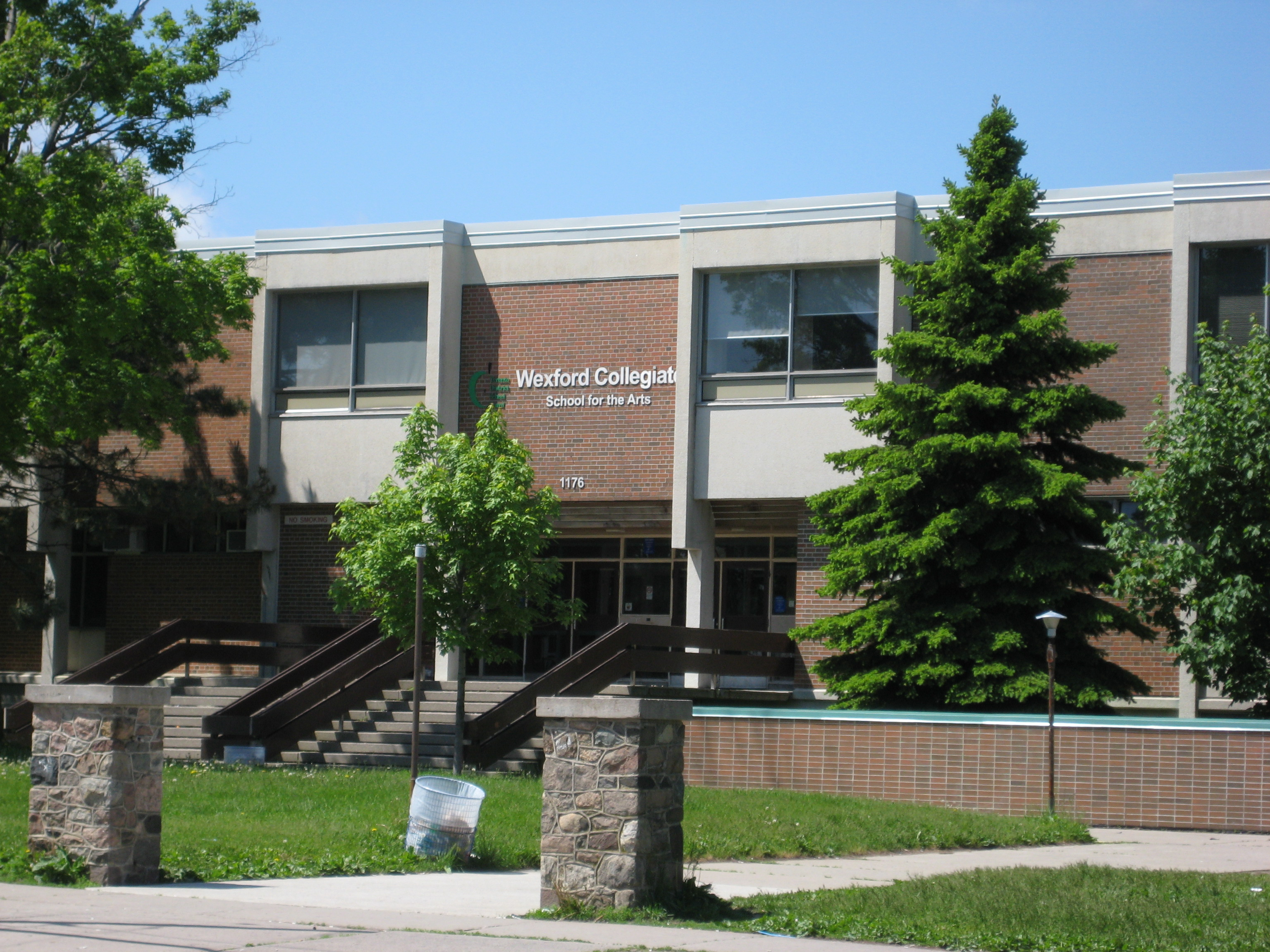
Wexford Collegiate School for the Arts is a public secondary school in Wexford.

Two public school boards operate schools in Wexford, the separate Toronto Catholic District School Board (TCDSB), and the secular Toronto District School Board (TDSB).

Both TCDSB and TDSB operate public schools in the neighbourhood:

- Buchanan Public School
- George Peck Public School
- Manhattan Park Junior Public School
- Precious Blood Catholic School is a school located on 1035 Pharmacy Avenue serving Kindergarten to Grade 8. It opened in 1950 as St. Teresa School by the Congregation of Notre Dame in the village of Wexford. The modern school was built on the land owned by James and Jesse Grant erected in 1953 and opened in September 1954 with Sister St. Agnes of the Daughters of Wisdom as principal with 444 pupils and 15 staff members. The Congregation of Notre Dame withdrew its teaching duties in 1956. In 1963, the school had a population of 920 students.
- Senator O'Connor College School, in North York
- St. Kevin Catholic School
- Wexford Public School
- Wexford Collegiate School for the Arts

The French-first language public secular school board, Conseil scolaire Viamonde, and it separate counterpart, Conseil scolaire catholique MonAvenir also offer schooling to applicable residents of Wexford, although they do not operate a school in the neighbourhood, with CSCM/CSV students attending schools situated in other neighbourhoods in Toronto.

== Recreation ==
Wexford is home to several municipal parks, including Wexford Park, located in the southwest of the neighbourhood. Municipal parks in Wexford are managed by the Toronto Parks, Forestry and Recreation Division. The neighbourhood is also home to several recreational sports associations, including the Scarborough Minor Hockey Association, and the Wexford Soccer Club.

== Landmarks ==
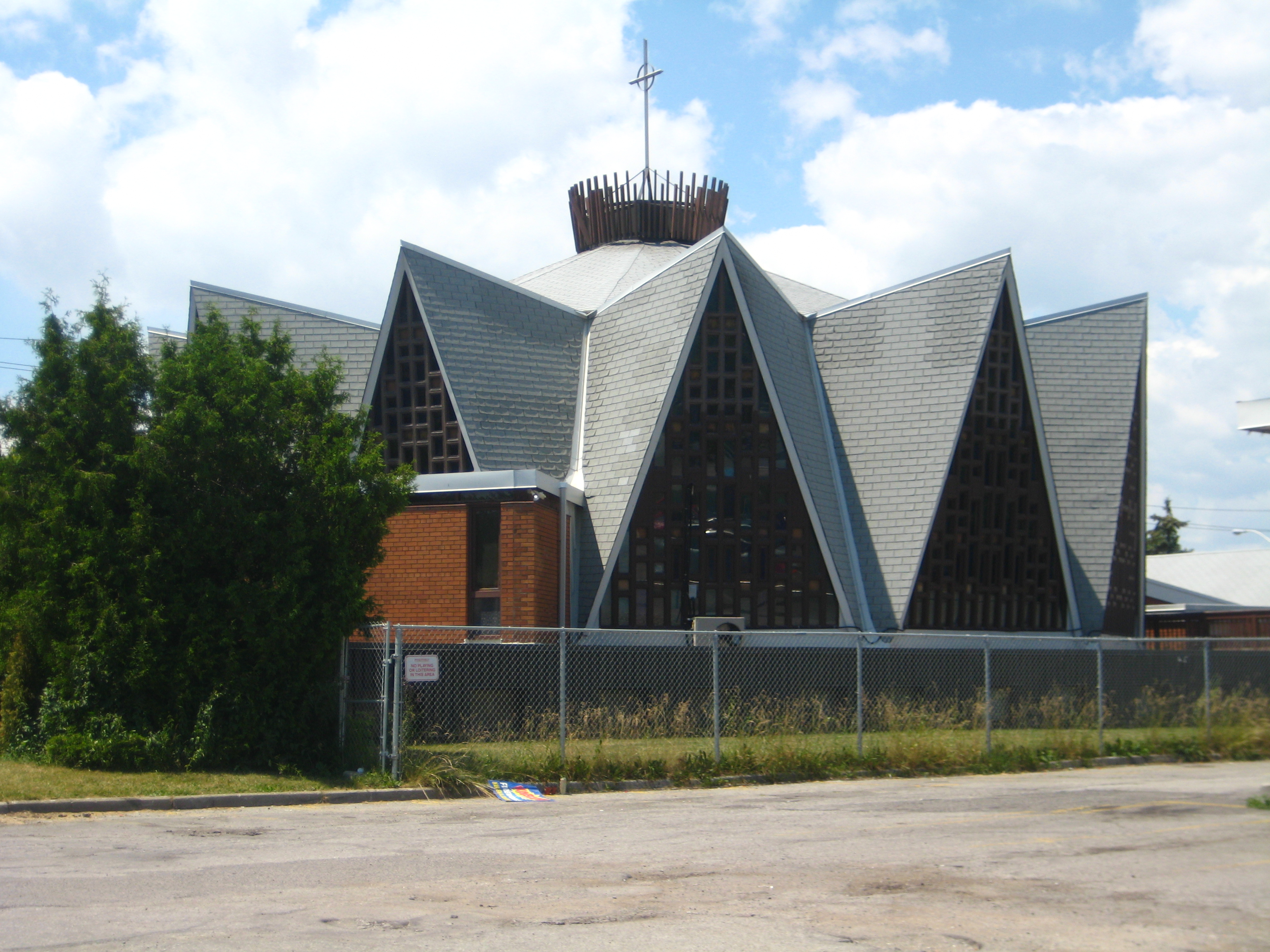
Wexford Presbyterian Church is one of several places of worship in Wexford.

Two shopping centres are located in Wexford, Wexford Heights Plaza, and Westford Shopping Centre.

The neighbourhood is home to a number of churches. They include:

- Church of St. Jude
- Precious Blood Roman Catholic Church
- Scarborough Citadel of the Salvation Army
- St. John's Greek Orthodox Church
- Wexford Heights United Church (2002 Merger of the historic Zion-Wexford and Wilmar Heights congregations)
- Wexford Presbyterian Church
