= Claire Ferchaud =

French visionary and mystic

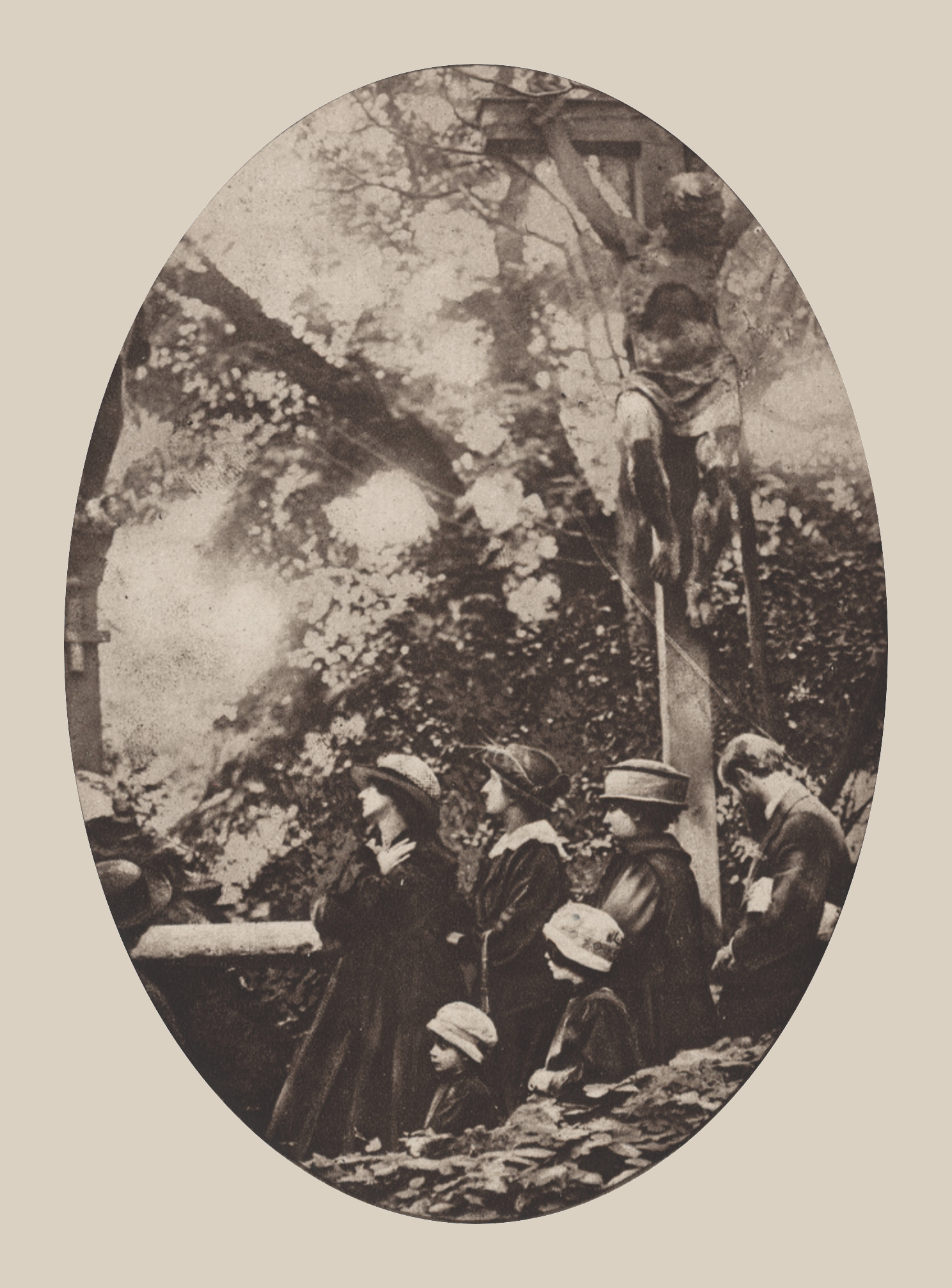
Claire Ferchaud and followers praying in the garden of the Church of Saint-Pierre de Montmartre, 1918

Claire Ferchaud (5 May 1896 – 29 January 1972), religious name Claire of Jesus Crucified, was a French visionary and mystic, whose claims were ultimately rejected by the Catholic Church. She was linked to the Devotion of the Sacred Heart of Jesus during World War I.

== Childhood ==
Claire Ferchaud was born a few miles from Saint-Laurent-sur-Sèvre, in the little village des Rinfillières du Puy-Saint-Bonnet, in the province of Vendée. She attended the school of the Sacred Heart and since her early childhood, she said she had had appearances from Jesus Christ, Mary (mother of Jesus) and Saint Joan of Arc. They ‘would come to meet her’ and would give her ‘messages’.

In 1916, during World War I, she lived in the convent of the ‘Rinfilières’ at Loublande, France. At that time, she claimed to have been given a vision of Christ himself, a vision of Jesus showing his heart "slashed by the sins of mankind" and crossed by a deeper wound still, atheism. She passed this on to the pastor of the town, the Abbé Audebert.

== Encounter with the President of France ==
Ferchaud believed she had been appointed to undertake a mission by Christ, namely, to contact the President of France, Raymond Poincaré, beg him to convert to the right path of Christian civilization, namely Catholicism, to give a good example by rejecting Freemasonry, to display the image of the Sacred Heart on the flag of France and that of the French Army and to allow the carrying of this emblem on the uniforms of the soldiers. On all this, she claimed, would depend the victory over the enemy.

Ferchaud expressed all this in a letter which was delivered to the President of the Republic on 16 January 1917, as acknowledged by his Secretary, Mr. Sainsère.

As a result of the insistent intervention of Armand Charles de Baudry of Asson, member of Parliament a royalist for the seat of Vendée, it was formally received on 21 March at the Élysée Palace, where she came to deliver her message. She declared that, “The Sacred Heart is the official patron of France. France must recognize God for its master.” “France must show that religion is no longer being persecuted by agreeing to paint the Sacred Heart on its flag.”

The President explained that he alone could not change France's anti-clerical laws, and that he was not permitted to change anything on the national flag. He seems to have promised her to refer the question to the Chamber of Deputies of the Third Republic, but nothing further was done. Claire Ferchaud therefore wrote to him a second letter on 1 May, which also had no effect.

== Appeal to the Generals ==
On 7 May 1917, Ferchaud then addressed a letter of warning to 14 generals of the French Army, calling for ‘the image of the Sacred Heart, sign of hope and salvation’, to be inserted onto ‘our national colors’. Fifteen copies of this letter were written and sent to the following generals:

- Hubert Lyautey, Minister of War in the previous Government of Aristide Briand;
- Philippe Pétain, General in chief of all Armies;
- Joseph Alfred Micheler, Commandant of the 1st Army;
- Adolphe Guillaumat, Commandant of the 2nd Army;
- Georges Louis Humbert, Commandant of the 3rd Army;
- Henri Joseph Eugène Gouraud, Commandant of the 4th Army;
- Fénelon François Germain Passaga, Commandant of the 5th Army;
- Paul Maistre, Commandant of the 6th Army;
- Antoine Baucheron de Boissoudy, Commandant of the 7th Army;
- Augustin Gérard, Commandant of the 8th Army;
- Denis Auguste Duchêne, Commandant of the 10th Army;

And also to Generals: Édouard de Castelnau, Robert Georges Nivelle, Marie Émile Fayolle, and Ferdinand Foch.

It is known today, from two sources which attested to the fact (that of the curé of Bonbon, the abbé Paul Noyer and that of Father Perroy on 17 November 1918), that only General Foch, (Commanding the 20th Corps in Nancy and later the Supreme Commander of Allied Forces) ‘consecrated’ the armed forces of the French and their Allies ‘to the Sacred Heart’ on 16 July 1918, during a private ceremony.

The Sacred Heart was, in fact, invoked during this conflict by millions of faithful Catholics, but was never placed on the Flag. In fact, the image of the Sacred Heart, was broadcast very widely. Millions of copies were distributed. It was commonly found in the trenches, to the point that a circular from the Minister of War of 6 August 1917 (countersigned by Philippe Pétain) prohibited its exhibition.

== Retirement after the war ==
Retiring to her native region of Mauges, Ferchaud organized a religious community of "Virgins of Reparation" which received, at first, the support of the religious authorities. On 12 March 1920, however, a decree of the Holy Office disavowed her revelations and stated that belief in the visions of Loublande could not be approved. The Archbishop of Paris, Cardinal Léon-Adolphe Amette declared that regretfully he was unable to discover a supernatural inspiration in her statements.

== Bibliography ==
- Jean-Yves Le Naour, Claire Ferchaud – La Jeanne d'Arc de la Grande Guerre, Hachette Littératures, coll. « Essais », 2007, 285 p.
- Claude Mouton-Raimbault, Présence de Claire Ferchaud, DPF Éditions de Chiré.
