= Church of St. Jude (Wexford) =

Coordinates: 43°44′19″N 79°18′21″W

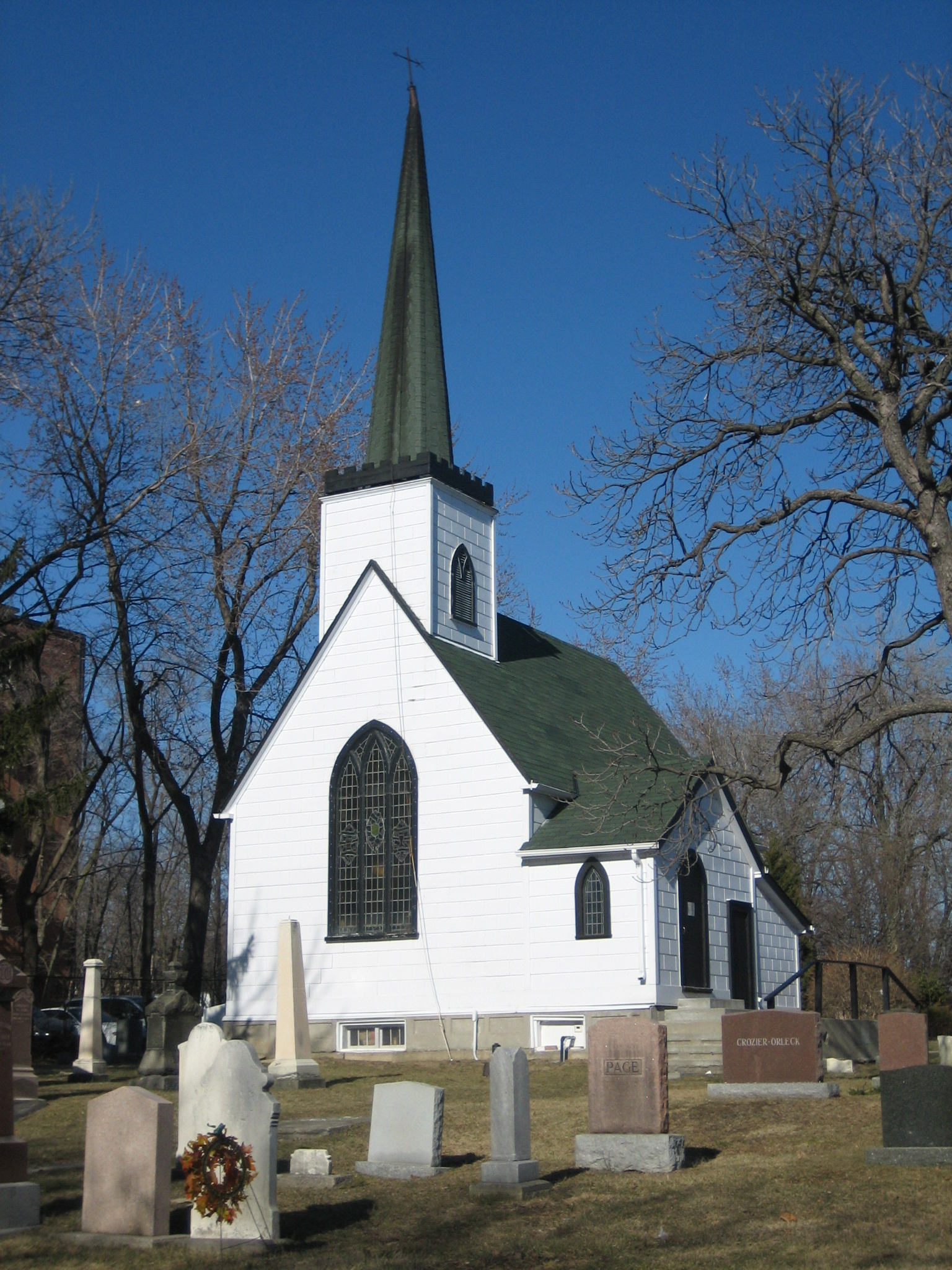
- The old Church of St. Jude
- Church of St. Jude
- Location: Toronto, Ontario, Canada
- Denomination: Anglican Church of Canada
- Churchmanship: Broad church
- Website: stjudewexford.ca

History
- Founded: 1848
- Dedication: St. Jude

Administration
- Province: Ontario
- Diocese: Toronto

Clergy
- Priest(s): Gregory Carpenter (incumbent); Eric Howes (honorary assistant); Francis Xavier (honorary assistant); Fred Hiltz (honorary assistant)

The Church of St. Jude is an historic church in the Scarborough area of Toronto, Ontario, Canada. St. Jude's was originally built in what was the small rural village of Wexford, Ontario in 1848. The original church building survives today, being used as the cemetery chapel, making it one of the oldest surviving churches in Scarborough. The land for the church was donated to Bishop John Strachan and the Anglican Diocese of Toronto by Patrick and Ann Parkin. They had used this corner of their farm as a family cemetery. The church was built atop a small hill, so that it dominated the surrounding landscape. The still operational cemetery surrounds the church, and has graves dating back to 1832. Local farmers built the church with lumber milled from nearby trees. The Gothic Revival structure was designed by Reverend William Darling, the Anglican minister for Scarborough township. It is a replica in miniature of a church he remembered from his native Scotland. Keeping the proportions of the original while greatly shrinking the structure explains why the sacristy entrance is only five feet high. Darling's son, Frank Darling, would later become a prominent Toronto architect himself.

The small church sat some 60 people, and for over a century it served the rural and sparsely populated farmers of the region. In 1950 there were 79 members of the church. The 1950s saw the rapid spread of residential subdivisions across the once rural Wexford as Scarborough became one of Toronto's main bedroom communities. By the mid 1950s the area was home to some 1,000 families, and the church was greatly overcrowded with many services required each Sunday. It was thus decided to build a new St. Jude's. The new church was completed in 1958, and sat 600 - almost 10 times the number of the original church.

Since the completion of the new church, the small church has been temporarily rented by small congregations over the years including members of the Macedonian Orthodox Church, Bulgarian Orthodox Church, Polish National Catholic Church, Russian Orthodox Church, and most recently, the Georgian Orthodox Church. It is also used as a chapel for weddings and other events by the St. Jude's congregation.

Today, St. Jude's provides its primary weekly Sunday service at 10:30 AM, which is also streamed online via its Facebook page, using the Book of Alternative Services. Sunday mornings at 8:00 AM, there is a smaller service offered according to the rites of the Book of Common Prayer as used by the Anglican Church of Canada. The basement level of the church is rented out and used on Sundays by a congregation belonging to the Ethiopian Orthodox Tewahedo Church, and also throughout the week by other community groups such as Alcoholics Anonymous. St. Jude's also offers a food bank service to the community via its Deacon's Pantry outreach ministry, that operates on Wednesdays.

== See also ==
- List of Anglican churches in Toronto
