= Jungholtz =

Commune in Grand Est, France

- Commune
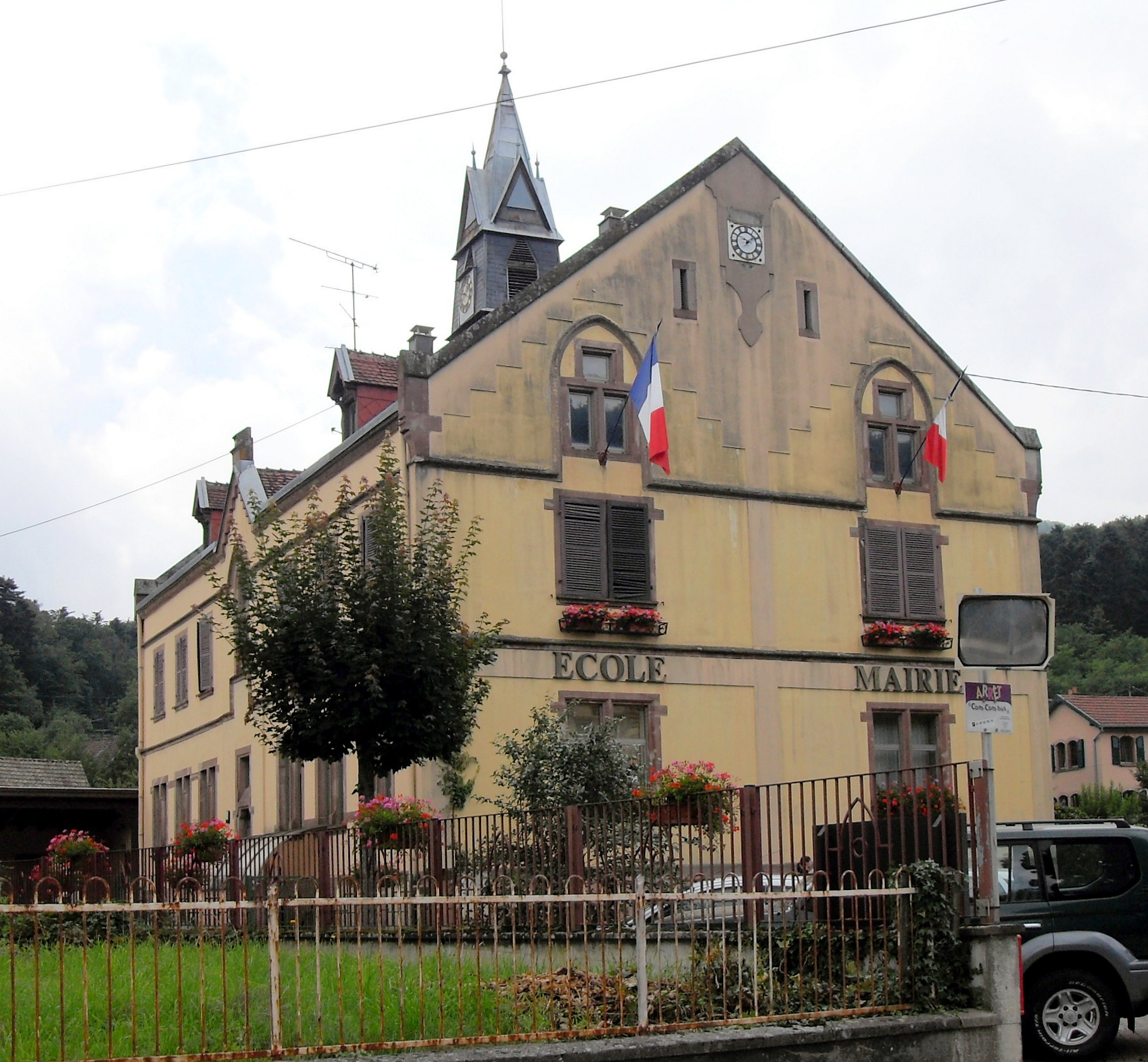
- The town hall and school in Jungholtz

- Coat of arms
- Location of Jungholtz
- Location within France Location within Grand Est
- Coordinates: 47°53′10″N 7°11′45″E
- Country: France
- Region: Grand Est
- Department: Haut-Rhin
- Arrondissement: Thann-Guebwiller
- Canton: Guebwiller
- Intercommunality: Région de Guebwiller

Government
  - Mayor (2020–2026): Guy Habecker
- Area^{1}: 4 km^{2} (1.5 sq mi)
- Elevation: 330 m (1,080 ft)
- Highest elevation: 881 m (2,890 ft)
- Lowest elevation: 297 m (974 ft)
- Population (2023): 897
  - Density: 220/km^{2} (580/sq mi)
- Time zone: UTC+01:00 (CET)
  - Summer (DST): UTC+02:00 (CEST)
- INSEE/Postal code: 68159 /68500
- ^{1} French Land Register data, which excludes lakes, ponds, glaciers > 1 km^{2} (0.386 sq mi or 247 acres) and river estuaries.

Jungholtz (French pronunciation: [juŋ(ɡ)ɔlts]; German: Jungholz) is a commune in the Haut-Rhin department in Grand Est in north-eastern France.

The Basilica of Our Lady of Thierenbach, formerly the church of Thierenbach Priory, a dissolved Cluniac monastery, is located here.

== See also ==
- Communes of the Haut-Rhin département
