= Avioth =

- Commune
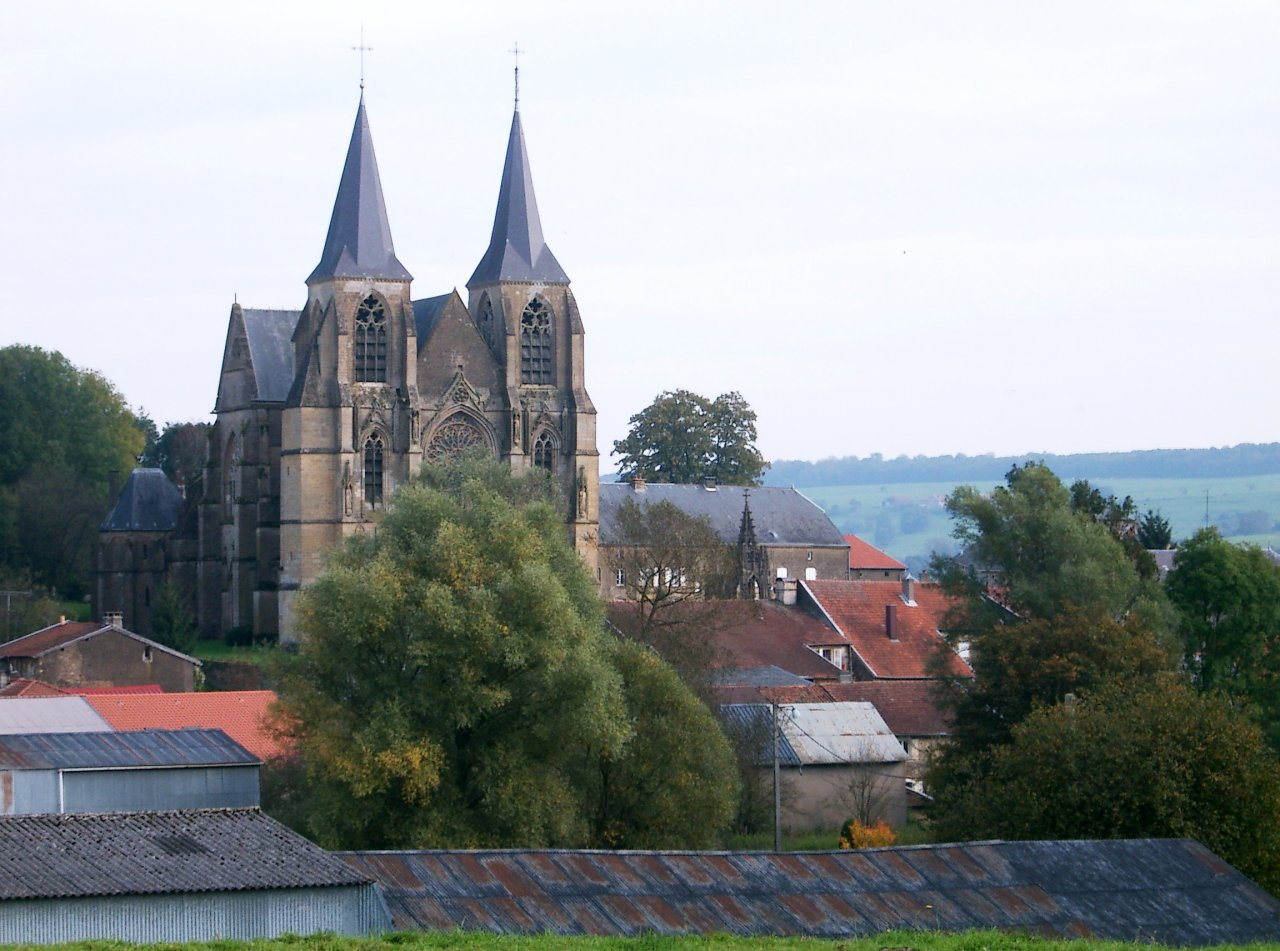
- Our Lady's basilica
- Location of Avioth
- Location within France Location within Grand Est
- Coordinates: 49°34′02″N 5°23′30″E
- Country: France
- Region: Grand Est
- Department: Meuse
- Arrondissement: Verdun
- Canton: Montmédy
- Intercommunality: CC Pays Montmédy

Government
  - Mayor (2020–2026): Laurent Geoffroy
- Area^{1}: 6.5 km^{2} (2.5 sq mi)
- Elevation: 215 m (705 ft)
- Highest elevation: 315 m (1,033 ft)
- Lowest elevation: 196 m (643 ft)
- Population (2023): 119
  - Density: 18/km^{2} (47/sq mi)
- Time zone: UTC+01:00 (CET)
  - Summer (DST): UTC+02:00 (CEST)
- INSEE/Postal code: 55022 /55600
- ^{1} French Land Register data, which excludes lakes, ponds, glaciers > 1 km^{2} (0.386 sq mi or 247 acres) and river estuaries.

Avioth (French pronunciation: [avjɔt]) is a commune in the Meuse department in the Grand Est region in northeastern France. The monumental church was built in the 13th-15th century. Next to the church is the 15th century flamboyant gothic chapel la Recevresse.

== Population ==
Historical population
| Year | Pop. | ±% p.a. |
|---|---|---|
| 1968 | 152 | — |
| 1975 | 108 | −4.76% |
| 1982 | 103 | −0.67% |
| 1990 | 122 | +2.14% |
| 1999 | 115 | −0.65% |
| 2007 | 120 | +0.53% |
| 2012 | 136 | +2.53% |
| 2017 | 144 | +1.15% |
| 2023 | 119 | −3.13% |
Source: INSEE

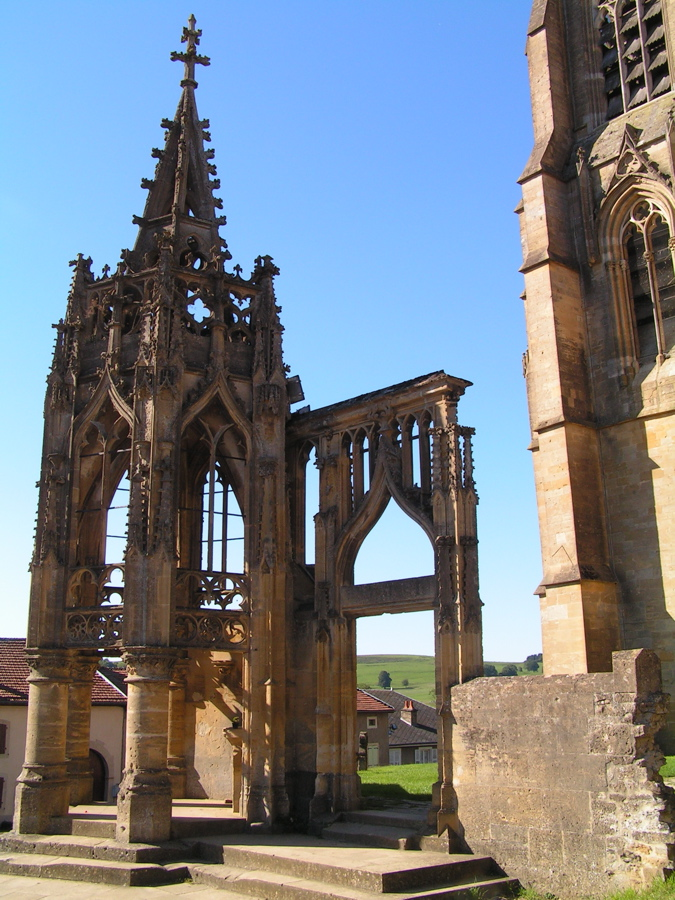
The Recevresse

== See also ==
- Communes of the Meuse department
