= Basilica of Our Lady of Thierenbach =

Church in Haut-Rhin, France

Coordinates: 47.8817°N 7.1892°E

The Basilica of Our Lady of Thierenbach is a Cluniac priory and minor basilica located in Jungholtz, in the Alasace region of France.

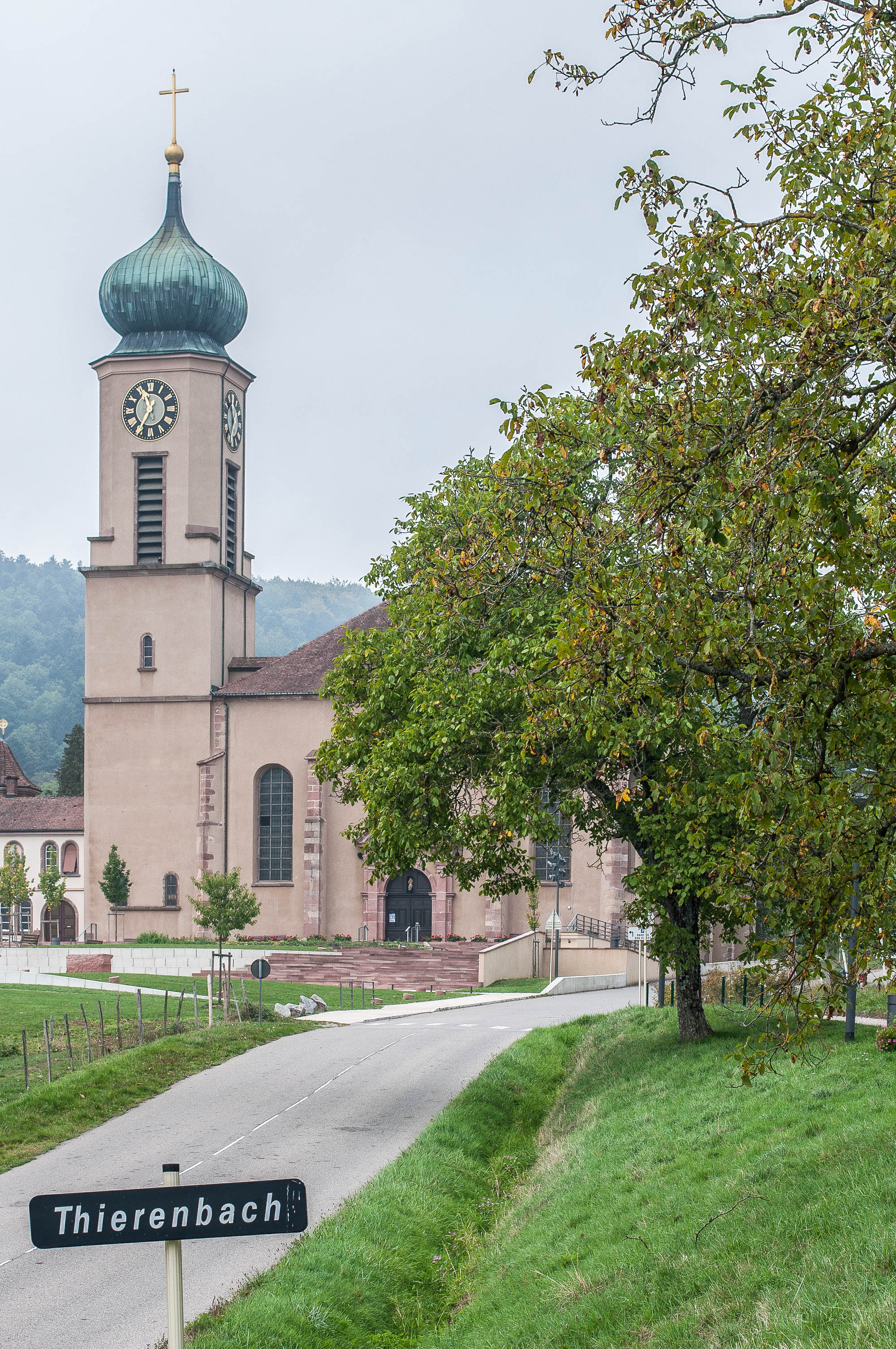
The exterior of the basilica

The priory was built on the order of the Abbot of Cluny Abbey in the Benedictine order, with construction occurring around 1130. Monks from Cluny Abbey occupied the priory until the 17th century. The current structure was designed by Peter Thumb and was built between 1719 and 1723 after the original 12th-century structure was destroyed during the Thirty Years War. The basilica was later abandoned during the French Revolution.

The current church was built in the Baroque style, with a number of typical Baroque features, such as ex-voto images along the walls, and an elaborate altarpiece. The most recent building works, taking place in 1932, saw the erection of a Baroque bell tower, topped with a bulbous dome. Today, the basilica draws hundreds of thousands of pilgrims a year, and is a significant site of pilgrimage in the Alsace region.

== History ==
The origins of the priory date back to 730, when a number of Benedictine monks started a mission to convert the population of Alsace. Numerous churches were built by them in the 8th century in Alsace. The Cluniac mission built on the foundations of the Benedictine missions after the miraculous cure of a supposedly incurable disease inflicted upon a young man from Soultz. According to legend, he pledged to build a shrine to the Virgin Mary if he was cured. Attracted by these stories, a Cluniac mission was built in the town. The religious community never exceeded more than ten monks, and they were subservient to the mother monastery at Cluny.

The priory existed for several centuries but was extensively attacked and damaged during the Middle Ages and in the Thirty Years War. The priory interior was heavily damaged in 1276 in a fire, and it was sacked by peasants in 1525. The archives of the early monastery and the church itself were extensively damaged deliberately during the Thirty Years War, in 1640.

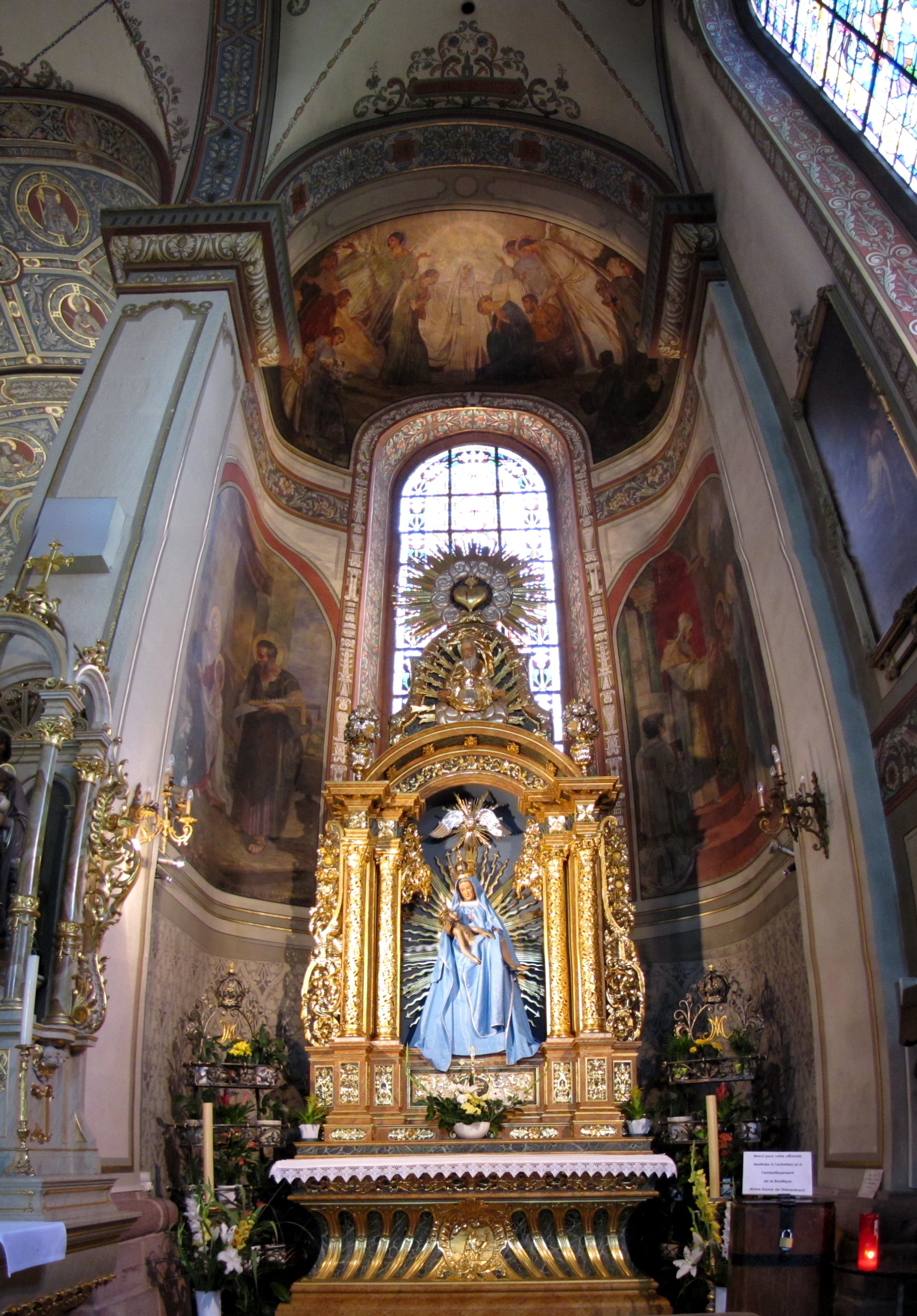
The ornate Baroque altarpiece of the basilica

During the French Revolution, the priory was disbanded, but the church survived, despite many churches in the area being destroyed. The monks refused to sign the Constitution of the Clergy, but the pilgrimage was restored with the priory in 1801 as part of Napoleon Bonaparte's Concordat of 1801.

The surrounding region was a frontline during the First World War, and was subject to artillery bombing, particularly at Old Armand and Sudel. Despite the proximity to the German-French border during the Second World War, the church was left relatively undamaged. Numerous side-chapels and other devotional centres were added, including a chapel dedicated to the Good Shepherd, which serves as the reliquary of the church, holding relics pertaining to many saints, including St Francis Xavier.

The priory was restored and is a centre of pilgrimage in the area in the current day. Recent building works include the building of a bell tower in 1932. The church is also a centre of tourism, due to the history of the priory, and the ornate Baroque interiors and approximately 850 ex-voto images.

== The Church Grounds ==
The church grounds contain a number of significant features. There is a calvary station, with a nearby fountain and well, as well as the remains of a chapel dedicated to St Anne, the Mother of Mary. The chapel of St Anne was built to replace the hermitage which had long stood on the site. The remains are now part of an inn, used to house the many thousands of pilgrims who regularly visit the basilica on a pilgrimage of devotion to Our Lady of Thierenbach.

== Pilgrimages ==
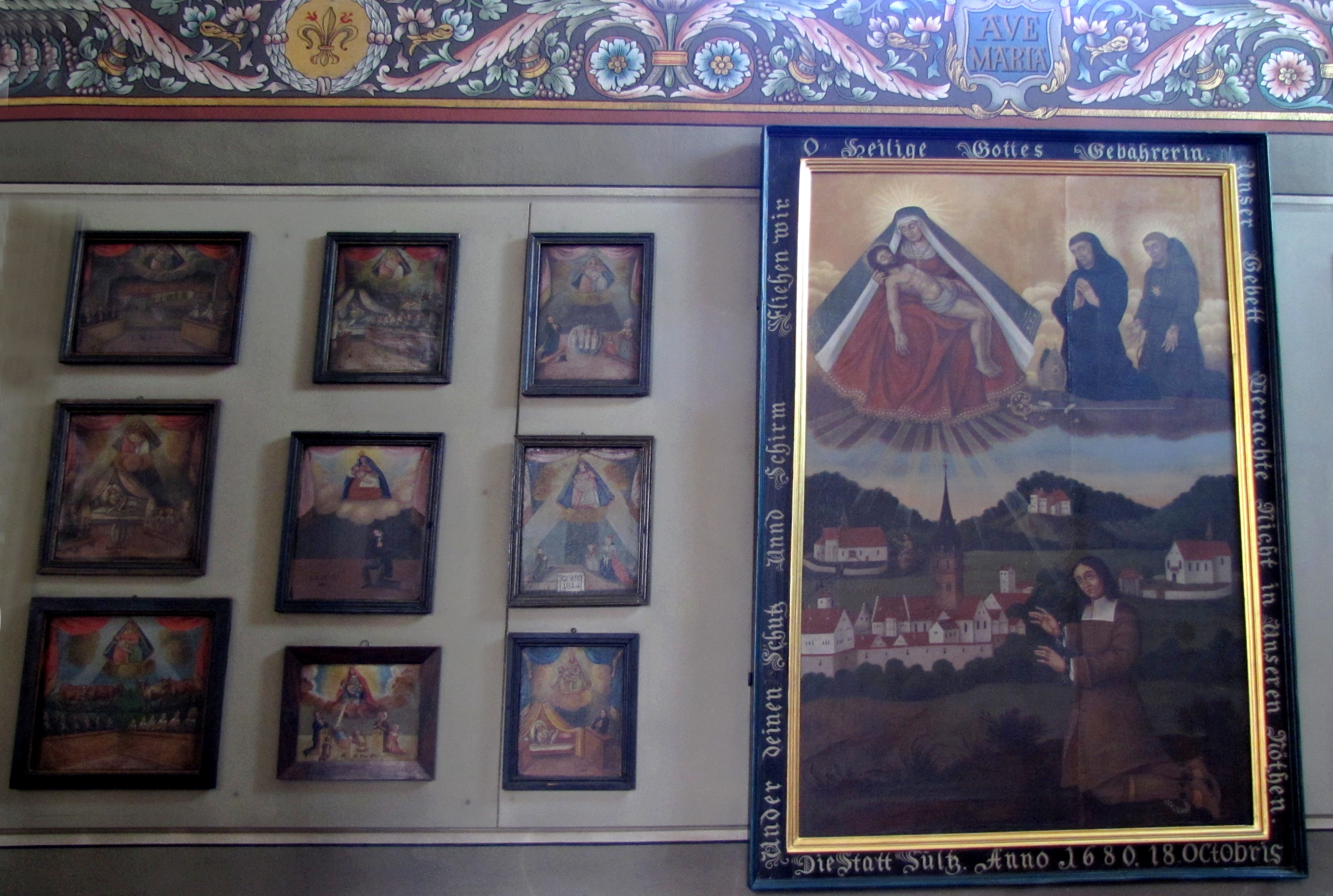
An example of some of the ex-voto images

The site holds a number of significant pilgrimages each year. These include:

- The pilgrimage of 'travelers' in May
- The Polish pilgrimage in June
- The pilgrimage of the sick and injured in June
- The pilgrimage of the Eastern Ukrainians in September
- The pilgrimage of the National Union of Combatants (NCU) in October
