= Marie Louise Trichet =

18th-century French beatified Catholic nun

Blessed Marie Louise Trichet
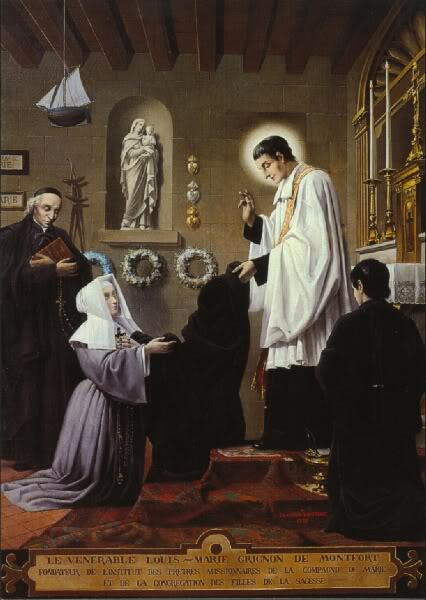
- Depiction of Trichet with St. Louis de Montfort, at the Daughter of the Wisdom congregation, 19th century
- Born: 7 May 1684; Poitiers, France
- Died: 28 April 1759 (aged 74); Saint-Laurent-sur-Sèvre
- Venerated in: Roman Catholic Church
- Beatified: 16 May 1993, Saint Peter's Square, Vatican City by Pope John Paul II
- Feast: April 28

Marie Louise Trichet, also known as Marie-Louise de Jésus (1684–1759), was a French Catholic figure who, with Louis de Montfort, founded the Congregation of religious women called Daughters of Wisdom and since the age of seventeen devoted her life to caring for the poor and the sick. She is also referred to as the First Daughter of Wisdom. She was beatified by Pope John Paul II.

== Early life and background ==
=== Childhood and education ===
Trichet was born in Poitiers, on the Clain River in west central France on 7 May 1684 and baptized at the church of St. Etienne. Her father Julien was a court magistrate in Poitiers and her mother Françoise Lecocq was deeply religious, as was most of her family. She was the fourth child and third daughter, and had seven siblings.

The eldest, Jeanne, struck with paralysis at the age of thirteen, was cured three years later during a visit to Notre Dame des Ardilliers at Saumur. Her younger brother Alexis, born just one year earlier, was ordained a priest in 1710 and later died after volunteering to minister to plague stricken inmates in a prison camp. The youngest of her sisters later joined the Daughters of Wisdom.

Trichet grew up in an atmosphere of religion and education, and when seven years old, was sent to the boarding school at Poitiers run by the Sisters of St. Jeanne de Lestonac to acquire the social qualifications suitable for the upper echelons of seventeenth-century France.

=== Poitiers ===
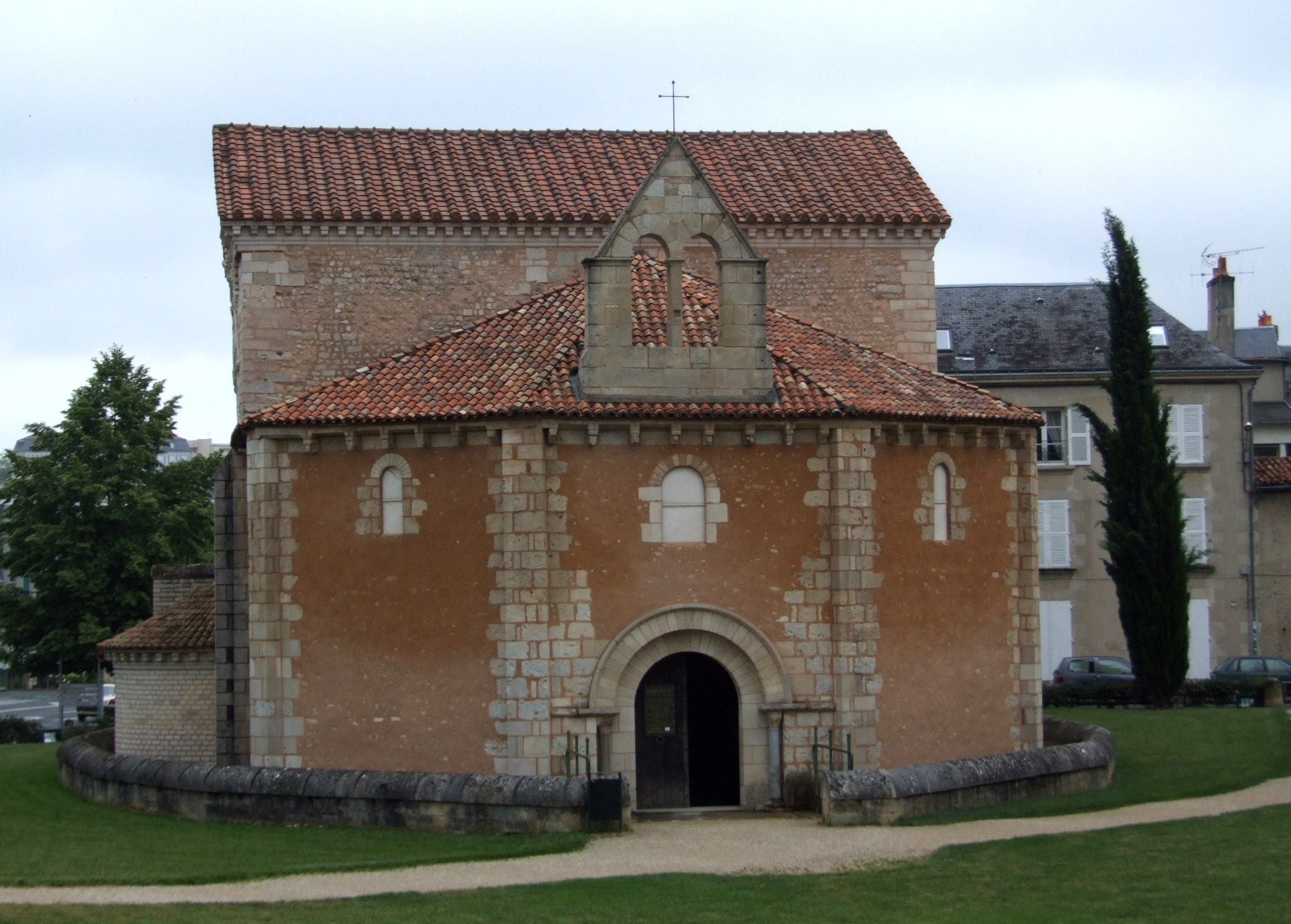
Baptistère Saint-Jean (4th century) in Poitiers

The area of western France where she grew up had a strong Christian tradition. Poitiers is home to Baptistère Saint-Jean, reportedly the oldest extant Christian building in France, and the historic Battle of Tours was fought just 20 km north of Poitiers in the 8th century. Poitiers was also important in that in the 15th century the French royal parliament in exile moved from Paris to Poitiers. In the 16th century, Poitiers impressed visitors because of its relatively large size, royal courts, university, prolific printing shops, religious institutions, cathedral and numerous parishes.

Yet the apparent affluence of Poitiers in the 17th century, prior to the French Revolution, had a less than royal side. France was plagued by corruption, and rampant poverty. At Poitiers, beggars, cripples and drunks were forcibly sent to a stone building called the General Hospital. The hospital inmates were only offered a common room, one bed for two or three, black bread and a stew of unknown origin – and had to wear a rough gray uniform.

In 1701, Father Louis de Montfort arrived in Poitiers, having been ordained a priest in June 1700, young and highly idealistic priest. He had a strong devotion to the Blessed Virgin Mary and the Holy Angels. Thus apart from offering mass and hearing confessions, Montfort used to spend much time with the poor of the Poitiers General Hospital, where he later became the chaplain. He tried to introduce rules and rights for the inmates, but met strong resistance from the hospital authorities.

== Meeting Louis de Montfort ==
At seventeen, Trichet met for the first time Louis-Marie Grignion de Montfort who had just been appointed chaplain of the hospital of Poitiers. Marie-Louise offered her services to the hospital, devoting most of her time to the poor and the sick. When she was nineteen, Montfort asked her to come and live there. Given that there was no official position for a governor at the hospital, despite her family background and education, she volunteered to enter the hospital "as an inmate".

Trichet's parents were not pleased with her decision to enter the hospital as an inmate and her mother reportedly told her: "You will become as mad as that priest". On 2 February 1703 Marie Louis left her family, consecrated herself to God and received a religious habit from Montfort.

Frustrated with the local bishops, Montfort set off to make a pilgrimage to Rome, to ask Pope Clement XI, what he should do. The Pope recognised his real vocation and, telling him that there was plenty of scope for its exercise in France, sent him back with the title of Apostolic Missionary. Thus Montfort left Poitiers and for several years he travelled on foot, preaching missions from Brittany to Nantes. His reputation as a missioner grew, and he became known as "the good Father from Montfort".

== At Poitiers hospital ==
Before leaving, Montfort had established the Rule of the Daughters of Wisdom for the small congregation he had formed with Trichet as the first member. With the rule, to this day the congregation strives to acquire heavenly wisdom by imitating the Incarnate Wisdom, Jesus Christ. The means for imitating Christ is a special devotion to the Blessed Virgin Mary.

After Montfort's departure, Trichet was left alone at the hospital to care for the sick while awaiting his occasional letters of encouragement. For ten years, Marie-Louise would fulfill her humble duty as a nurse. That was the beginning of a four decade effort during which she nursed the sick; gave food to beggars and administered the great maritime hospital of France. The poor people of the Hospital of Niort in Deux-Sèvres eventually came to call her "good Mother Jesus".

For almost her entire youth, Trichet lived among the poor and the sick, and served them, following the Rule left by Montfort. Gradually, the duties entrusted to her increased and from 1708 she substituted for the official bursar, and in 1711 she was in complete charge of the hospital. In 1714, she was joined by Catherine Brunet.

== Daughters of Wisdom ==
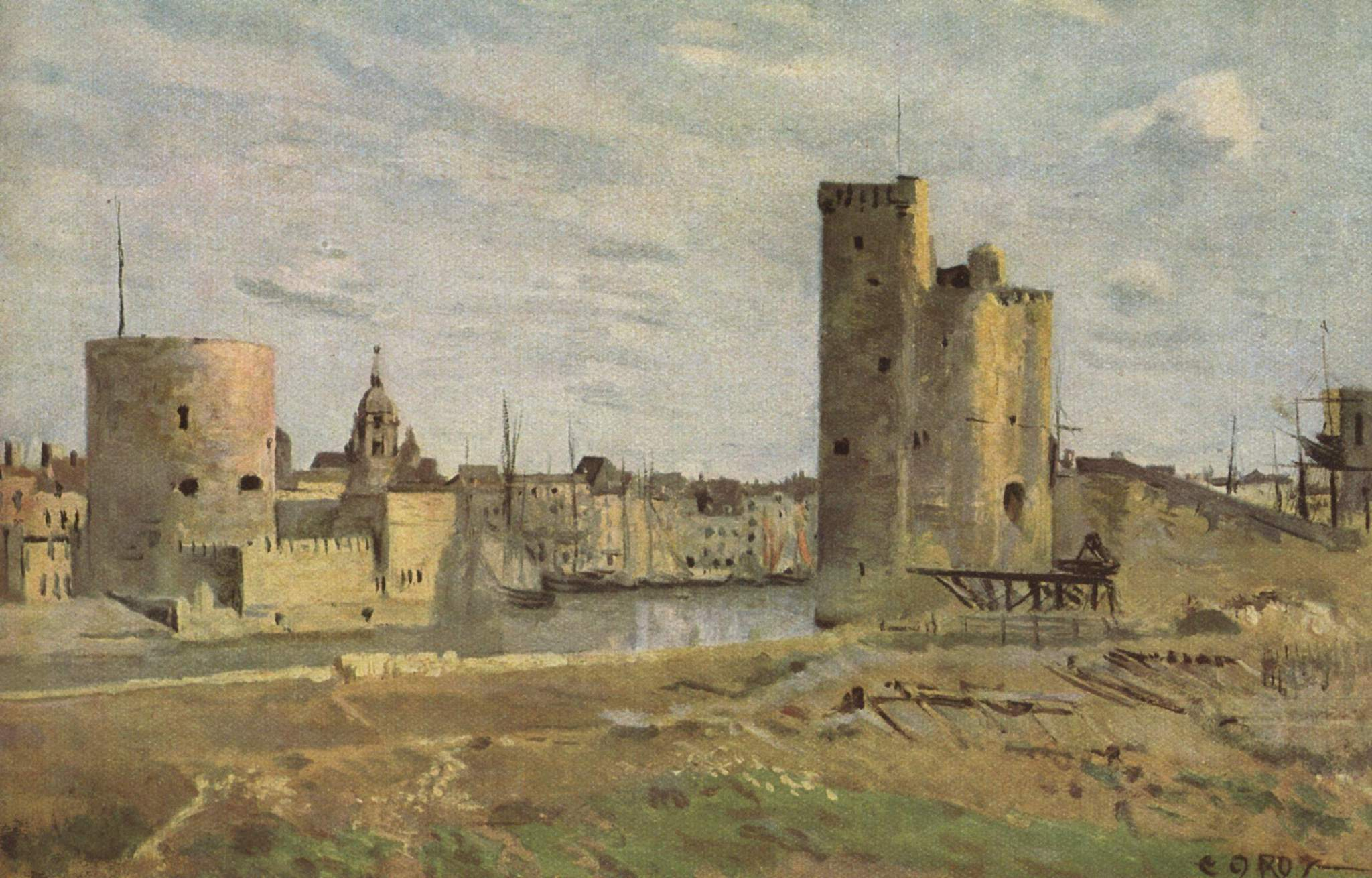
View of La Rochelle by Corot

Bishop de Champflour of La Rochelle on the Atlantic coast just to the west of Poitiers had been impressed with Montfort for some time. Based on the bishop's invitation to Montfort, in 1715 Trichet and Catherine Brunet left Poitiers for La Rochelle to open a free religious school there. In a short time, the free school, supported by the bishop and following the program and rules laid down by Montfort, had 400 students.

On 22 August 1715 Trichet and Brunet, along with Marie Valleau and Marie Régnier from La Rochelle received the approbation of Bishop de Champflour of La Rochelle to perform their religious profession under the direction of Montfort. At the ceremony Montfort told them: "Call yourselves the Daughters of Wisdom, for the teaching of children and the care of the poor."

=== Following the path of Montfort ===
In April 1716 Montfort had gone to Saint-Laurent-sur-Sèvre to preach, where he fell ill and died on 28 April 1716. The thirty-two-year-old Trichet thus had to assume the full responsibility for the foundation.

The Mother House at Saint-Laurent-sur-Sèvre

In 1719 the sisters went back to Poitiers and later managed to establish a Mother House in 1720 at Saint-Laurent-sur-Sèvre in the Maison Longue (the long house), now a museum devoted to her life and the Daughters of Wisdom. But they had to live in abject poverty for several years, at times living on black bread alone and occasionally an egg. In time with providence and the dowries provided by certain new novices, they acquired land that produced some revenue. As Montfort had predicted, in time more novices arrived and the organization grew.

In the thirty years that followed 1729 Trichet established thirty new charitable communities where the Daughters of Wisdom visited the poor, nursed the sick and taught children, with no payment, but supported by benefactors or parishioners. During the devastating famine of 1739 she begged the authorities to come to the rescue of the hungry.

In the houses of providence the Sisters lived with orphans, the aged, and the handicapped. At the general hospitals at La Rochelle, or at Niort in Deux-Sèvres their services were hired to introduce a minimal level of peace, joy and order to the prevailing filth and disorder.

=== Last years and death ===
When she was 66 years old, Trichet undertook a long journey on horseback to visit all her communities, talk with the Sisters and inspire them. She always told the Sisters: "Your real Superior is Mary; I am but her servant." That was her last trip, for upon returning to the Mother House at Saint-Laurent-sur-Sèvre she never left again. An accidental fall caused her months of suffering, followed by a final illness from which she did not recover. On her deathbed she called a benefactor to beg that the poor of the parish be cared for, after her death.

Trichet died at Saint-Laurent-sur-Sèvre in Vendée on 28 April 1759, the same day and location where Louis de Montfort had died 43 years earlier on 28 April 1716.

On Trichet's death, the congregation included 174 sisters distributed in 36 communities and the Mother House. After the persecutions during the French Revolution, the Daughters of Wisdom regrouped and grew again. They were awarded medals by the governments of France, Spain, Prussia, and Belgium for nursing the wounded or plague-stricken soldiers of those countries on many occasions.

== Legacy and beatification ==
Montfort and Trichet rest in adjacent tombs in the church of Saint-Laurent-sur-Sèvre. The Daughters of Wisdom have since grown into a multi-national organization.

On 16 May 1993 Trichet was beatified by Pope John-Paul II. In the process of examining her life prior to beatification, one cardinal wrote of her:

"She offers an example of how to work for the development of the whole human person in a spirit of sacrifice, looking for no reward, ever open to read the signs of the times with a serene and humble spirit."

On 19 September 1996 Pope John-Paul II came to meditate and pray on the tombs of Montfort and Trichet in Saint-Laurent-sur-Sèvre.

== Sources ==
- Jesus Living in Mary: Handbook of the Spirituality of St. Louis de Montfort, Litchfield, CT: Montfort Publications, 1994.
- Daughters of Wisdom http://www.daughtersofwisdom.org
- Montfortian https://web.archive.org/web/20071221234604/http://www.montfort.org/English/MLouiseE.htm
- Her life http://www.ewtn.com/library/Montfort/Handbook/Marloui.htm
