= Chrysostomos II Kioussis =

Greek archbishop

Chrysostomos II (Greek: Χρυσόστομος Β′; October 8, 1920 – September 19, 2010), born Athanassios Kioussis (Αθανάσιος Κιούσης), was an Archbishop of Athens and of all Greece of the Church of the Genuine Orthodox Christians of Greece from 1986 until his death.
