= Saint-Laurent-sur-Sèvre =

- Commune
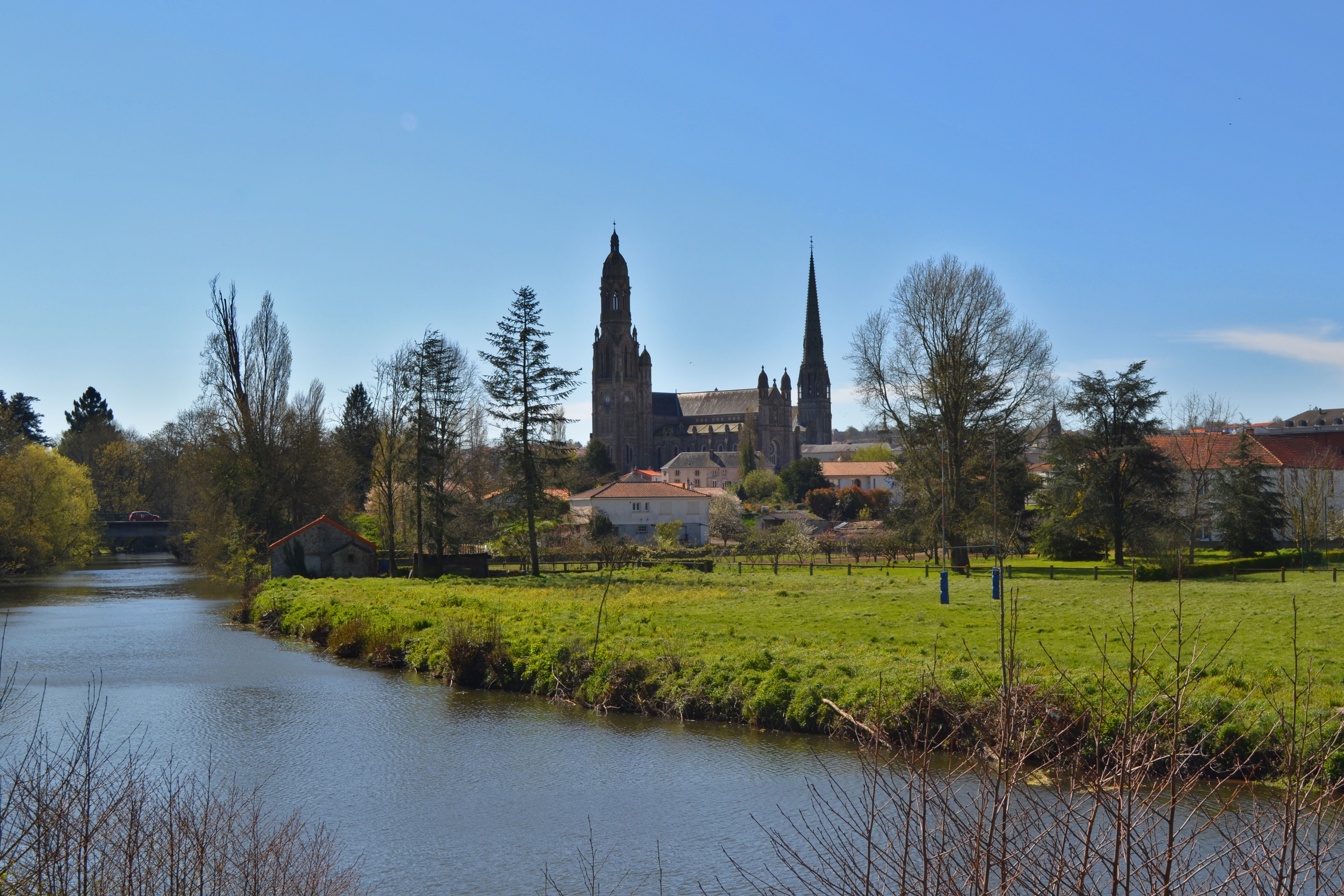
- View of Saint-Laurent-sur-Sèvre, with the pilgrimage church visible

- Coat of arms
- Location of Saint-Laurent-sur-Sèvre
- Location within France Location within Pays de la Loire
- Coordinates: 46°57′34″N 0°53′30″W
- Country: France
- Region: Pays de la Loire
- Department: Vendée
- Arrondissement: La Roche-sur-Yon
- Canton: Mortagne-sur-Sèvre
- Intercommunality: Pays de Mortagne

Government
  - Mayor (2020–2026): Éric Couderc
- Area^{1}: 15.79 km^{2} (6.10 sq mi)
- Elevation: 110 m (360 ft)
- Highest elevation: 199 m (653 ft)
- Lowest elevation: 98 m (322 ft)
- Population (2023): 3,550
  - Density: 225/km^{2} (582/sq mi)
- Time zone: UTC+01:00 (CET)
  - Summer (DST): UTC+02:00 (CEST)
- INSEE/Postal code: 85238 /85290
- ^{1} French Land Register data, which excludes lakes, ponds, glaciers > 1 km^{2} (0.386 sq mi or 247 acres) and river estuaries.

Saint-Laurent-sur-Sèvre (French pronunciation: [sɛ̃ loʁɑ̃ syʁ sɛvʁ], literally Saint-Laurent on Sèvre) is a commune in the Vendée department in the Pays de la Loire region in western France.

== Population ==
Historical population
Year	Pop.	±% p.a.
1968	2,545	—
1975	2,835	+1.55%
1982	3,208	+1.78%
1990	3,247	+0.15%
1999	3,307	+0.20%
2007	3,397	+0.34%
2012	3,535	+0.80%
2017	3,617	+0.46%
2023	3,550	−0.31%
Source: INSEE

== Pilgrimage ==
Some 25,000 visitors per year arrive at the town, for it is the burial place of two known Roman Catholic figures:

- Saint Louis de Montfort
- Blessed Marie Louise Trichet

The Basilica of Saint Louis de Montfort at Saint-Laurent-sur-Sèvre is a structure that attracts pilgrims each year.

On September 19, 1996, Pope John-Paul II visited the town to meditate and pray on the adjacent tombs of Saint Louis and Blessed Marie Louise. Pope John Paul II's strong Marian devotion was highly influenced by the Mariology of Saint Louis de Montfort. According to his Apostolic Letter Rosarium Virginis Mariae, the pontif's personal motto "Totus Tuus" was inspired by St. Louis' doctrine on total consecration to the Virgin Mary.

Claire Ferchaud was born in Saint-Laurent-sur-Sèvre.

== See also ==
- Communes of the Vendée department
