= God Alone =

Motto of Saint Louis de Montfort

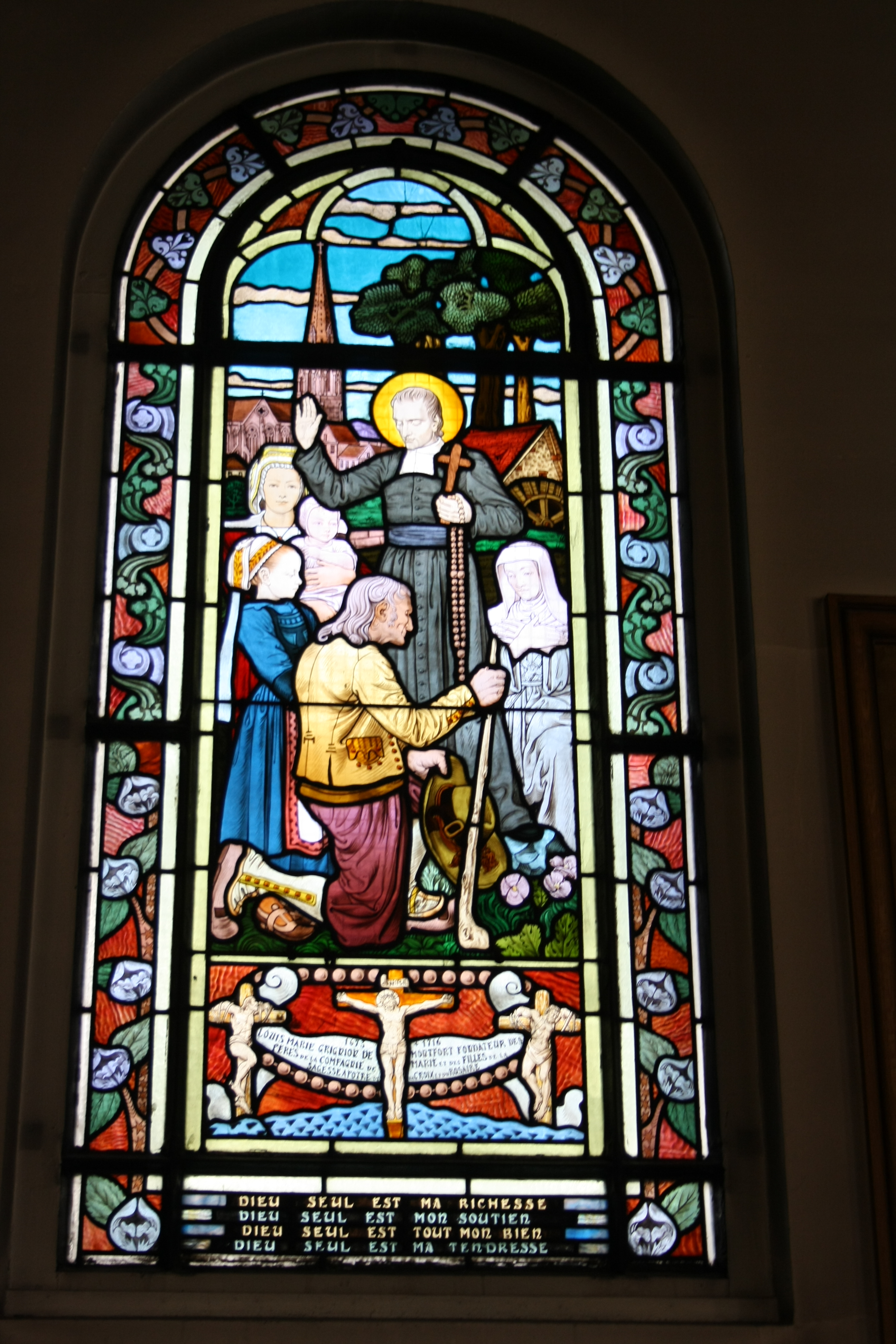
Stained glass of St. Louis de Montfort in Paris

God Alone was the motto and the title of the collected writings of Saint Louis de Montfort, one of the leading figures in the French school of spirituality and Roman Catholic Mariology.

Montfort wrote "God Alone" on all his correspondences and at the end of most of his hymns. The motto "God Alone" appears throughout his writings, almost as a refrain.

The motto and the message of the book summed up Montfortian spirituality in the formula, "To God Alone, by Christ's Wisdom, in the Spirit, in communion with Mary, for the reign of God."

== The motto ==
The book title is based on the fact that God Alone was the motto of Saint Louis de Montfort, and was repeated over 150 time in his writings. Through the influence of the French school of spirituality, and authors such as Henri Boudon, Montfort advocated a withdrawal from the world to seek God Alone.

When Pope Pius XII canonized Louis de Montfort on July 27, 1947, he said:

God alone was everything to him. Remain faithful to the precious heritage, which this great saint left you. It is a glorious inheritance, worthy, that you continue to sacrifice your strength and your life, as you have done until today.

Montfort was influenced by Boudon's book Dieu seul: Le Saint esclavage de l'admirable Mère de Dieu, (Only God, the Holy Slavery of the admirable Mother of God) and believed that all consecration, including Consecration to Mary was ultimately to God Alone.

== The book ==
The book provides five specific methods for praying the rosary with more devotion. These methods do not change the Our Father or Hail Mary prayers within the rosary, but interweave additional petitions, prayers and visualizations as the rosary is being prayed.

Although St Louis is perhaps best known for his Mariology and devotion to the Blessed Virgin Mary, his spirituality is founded upon the mystery of the Incarnation of Jesus Christ, and his Christian faith is centered on Christ as the focus of his religious devotion. The Virgin Mary, however, is also a key element in his spirituality.

The book summed up Montfortian spirituality in the formula "To God Alone, by Christ's Wisdom, in the Spirit, in communion with Mary, for the reign of God."

== See also ==
- Saint Louis de Montfort
- Mariology
- Secret of the Rosary
- Power of Catholic prayer
- The Power of the Rosary
- Methods of praying the rosary
- Saint Louis de Montfort's Prayer to Jesus

== Bibliography ==
- Saint Louis de Montfort, God Alone: The Collected Writings of St. Louis Marie De Montfort, Montfort Publications, 1995 ISBN 0-910984-55-7
- Saint Louis de Montfort, The Secret of the Rosary Tan Books & Publisher, 1976. ISBN 978-0-89555-056-9.
