= The Love of Eternal Wisdom =

- Author: St. Louis de Montfort
- Original title: L'Amour de la sagesse éternelle
- Language: French
- Subject: Christology, Catholic spirituality
- Genre: Theological treatise

The Love of Eternal Wisdom (French: L'Amour de la sagesse éternelle) is a foundational theological work written by Saint Louis de Montfort in the early 18th century. The book focuses on the theme of Christocentrism, presenting Jesus Christ as the incarnation of divine Wisdom. It forms the theological and spiritual basis for his later, more famous works, including the Treatise on True Devotion to the Blessed Virgin.

== Background ==
Saint Louis de Montfort wrote the book around 1703–1704 while residing in Paris, earlier than his best-known Marian writings. It was born out of his desire to preach the Gospel and his reflection on the contrast between the "wisdom of the world" and the "Wisdom of God" (as described in the Pauline epistles). The book draws heavily on the Wisdom literature of the Old Testament, particularly the Book of Wisdom, and applies these texts directly to Jesus Christ as the eternal Wisdom of God.

== Main themes ==
The central premise of the work is that Jesus Christ is the Eternal and Incarnate Wisdom of God, and that the ultimate goal of human life is to acquire, love, and possess this Wisdom.

The book contrasts the "false wisdom of the world" (which seeks worldly success, wealth, and comfort) with the "true Wisdom of God" (which embraces humility, charity, and the Cross). Montfort emphasizes that the highest expression of divine Wisdom is found in the crucifixion, famously stating that "Wisdom is the Cross, and the Cross is Wisdom."

== Means to acquire Wisdom ==
In the latter part of the book, Montfort outlines four principal means for a Christian to acquire and preserve this Eternal Wisdom:

1. An ardent desire – A sincere and constant longing for God.
2. Continuous prayer – Persistent communication with God.
3. Universal mortification – Embracing suffering, self-denial, and the "crosses" of daily life.
4. A tender devotion to the Blessed Virgin Mary – Montfort argues that because Mary is the Mother of the Incarnate Wisdom (Jesus), total consecration to her is the most effective and secure way to acquire and maintain the gift of divine Wisdom. This fourth point serves as the theological seed for his later detailed Marian theology found in the Treatise on True Devotion to the Blessed Virgin.

== Influence ==
The Love of Eternal Wisdom is essential for understanding Montfort's spirituality. While he is most widely known for his Marian devotion, this work demonstrates that his Mariology is entirely Christocentric—Mary is viewed strictly as the perfect means to arrive at Jesus, the Eternal Wisdom. This theological framework heavily influenced later Catholic thought and was praised by several popes, notably Pope John Paul II.

== See also ==
- Louis de Montfort
- The Admirable Secret of the Rosary
- The Secret of Mary
- Treatise on True Devotion to the Blessed Virgin

== Bibliography ==
- Louis-Marie Grignion de Montfort: The Love of Eternal Wisdom.
- René Laurentin: God Alone: The Collected Writings of St. Louis Marie de Montfort, Montfort Publications, 1987.
