= True Devotion to Mary =

Book by Louis-Marie Grignion de Montfort

True Devotion to Mary is a 1712 book by Saint Louis de Montfort on the Roman Catholic theme of devotion to the Blessed Virgin Mary. The original manuscript was discovered in 1842. The book was first published in 1843, more than a century following de Montfort's death in 1716.

The book was cited as an influence on the religious beliefs of Pope John Paul II, who borrowed his apostolic motto Totus Tuus from the book.

== History ==
Written in 1712, the manuscript remained practically unknown for more than a century, when it was discovered by chance in 1842, at the Motherhouse of the Missionaries of the Company of Mary at St. Laurent-sur-Sèvre, France. Published in 1843, the work became an instant success. It was first translated into English by Father William Faber The book complements de Montfort's other works the Secret of the Rosary and the Secret of Mary.

True Devotion to Mary attracted attention in the 20th century when in an address to the Montfort Fathers, Pope John Paul II said that reading this book had been a "decisive turning point" in his life. According to his Apostolic Letter Rosarium Virginis Mariae he borrowed his apostolic motto Totus Tuus from the book. In his 1987 encyclical, Redemptoris Mater the Pope cited Saint Louis Marie Grignion de Montfort as a teacher of Marian spirituality.

== See also ==
- Company of Mary
- Consecration and entrustment to Mary
- Daughters of Wisdom
