= Treatise on True Devotion to the Blessed Virgin =

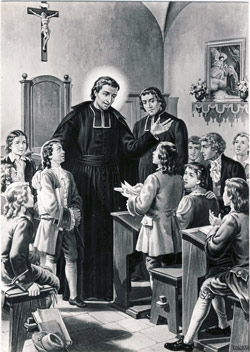
- Author: St. Louis de Montfort
- Original title: Traité de la vraie dévotion à la Sainte Vierge
- Language: French
- Subject: Mariology, Marian devotions
- Genre: Theological treatise, ascetical literature
- Published: 1843

Treatise on True Devotion to the Blessed Virgin (French: Traité de la vraie dévotion à la Sainte Vierge) is a classic work of Catholic spirituality and a foundational text in Mariology, written in 1712 by the French priest and missionary, Saint Louis-Marie Grignion de Montfort. The book presents the path of total consecration to Jesus Christ through the hands of Mary (a practice also known as "Marian slavery of love").

== History ==
The treatise was written by St. Louis in 1712. The author himself predicted within its pages that the manuscript would disappear into darkness for a long time, hidden from the world. This prediction came true – after his death in 1716, the manuscript was hidden in a chest, partly to protect it from destruction (especially during the unrest preceding the French Revolution).

The manuscript was accidentally discovered in the library of the missionaries from the Company of Mary (a congregation founded by Montfort) in 1842, more than a century after it was written. It was published in print a year later, in 1843, in France. Almost immediately after publication, it gained great acclaim, was translated into numerous languages, and achieved immense popularity among the faithful of the Catholic Church.

== Main message ==
The central premise of the Treatise is "total consecration to Jesus through Mary." In his work, Montfort demonstrates biblically and theologically that Mary is the shortest, simplest, and surest path to union with Christ.

The core practice described in the book is an act of personal consecration, which the author calls a voluntary "slavery of love." According to St. Louis, this form of devotion frees the believer from self-love and pride, allowing God to act more fully in their life. Montfort recommends that the faithful undergo a spiritual and ascetical preparation for this act (usually a 33-day period of reflection), followed by the wearing of a small chain as a physical sign of voluntary subjection. He also encourages constantly renewing the intention of acting "through Mary, with Mary, in Mary, and for Mary."

== Influence and legacy ==
The book has had a historical and indelible impact on Catholic spirituality and shaped Mariology in the 19th and 20th centuries. Popes have frequently referred to the teachings contained in the Treatise with approval, including Pius IX, Leo XIII (who beatified the author), Pius X, and Pius XII (who canonized Montfort in 1947).

This book held a special and very personal significance for Pope John Paul II. He read the Treatise during World War II while working as a laborer at the Solvay plant and considered it a complete turning point in his inner life. From St. Louis's work, the Polish Pope drew his famous episcopal and papal motto: Totus Tuus (Totally Yours). John Paul II later incorporated many ideas and motifs from this book into his Mariological encyclical Redemptoris Mater.

The teachings from the Treatise also inspired many other prominent figures in the Church, including Saint Maximilian Kolbe and the Primate of the Millennium, Cardinal Stefan Wyszyński.

Today, the Treatise (along with newer publications inspired by it) is widely used around the world as the basis for 33-day retreats preparing for the personal Act of Consecration to the Immaculate Heart of Mary.

== See also ==
- Louis de Montfort
- Totus Tuus
- Consecration and entrustment to Mary
- Company of Mary

== Bibliography ==
- Louis-Marie Grignion de Montfort: Treatise on True Devotion to the Blessed Virgin.
- René Laurentin: God Alone: The Collected Writings of St. Louis Marie de Montfort, Montfort Publications, 1987.
