= Alain Roche =

Alain Roche may refer to:

- Alain Roche (footballer)
- Alain Roche (pianist)

== See also ==
- Alanus de Rupe, also Alain de la Roche, Roman Catholic theologian
