= Methods of praying the rosary =

Five methods of praying the rosary are presented within the works of Louis de Montfort, a French Roman Catholic priest and writer of the early 18th century. Montfort was an early proponent of Mariology, and much of his work is devoted to the subjects of the Blessed Virgin Mary and the rosary. While the rosary contains a fixed set of prayers recited with the use of beads, Montfort proposed a number of methods to pray the rosary with more thorough devotion. Two of the methods are described in his book The Secret of the Rosary, in the fiftieth rose (chapter):

"In order to facilitate the exercise of the holy Rosary, here are several methods to recite it holily, with the meditation of the joyful, sorrowful and glorious mysteries of Jesus and Mary. You stop at that which is most to your liking: you can form yourself another particular method, as several saintly persons have done."

Three additional methods (i.e., five in total) are listed in the book God Alone, based on the collected writings of Montfort.

== The general approach ==
Montfort's first method does not change the Our Father or Hail Mary prayers within the rosary, but interleaves additional petitions or meditations as the rosary is being prayed. For instance, in the first method, Montfort provides specific additional prayers at the beginning of each decade: he requests detachment from material items, as follows:

"We offer Thee, O Child Jesus, this third decade in honor of Thy Blessed Nativity, and we ask of Thee through this mystery and through the intercession of Thy Blessed Mother, detachment from the things of this world, love of poverty and love of the poor."

Moreover, he adds a specific prayer after each decade. The following prayers are for the joyous mysteries:

- Grace of the mystery of the Incarnation, come down into my soul and make it truly humble.

- Grace of the mystery of the Visitation, come down into my soul and make it truly charitable.

- Grace of the mystery of the Nativity, come down into my soul and make me truly poor in spirit.

- Grace of the mystery of the Purification, come down into my soul and make it really wise and really pure.

- Grace of the mystery of the Finding of the Child Jesus in the Temple, come down into my soul and truly convert me.

Similar, but distinct, petitions are provided for the sorrowful and glorious mysteries.

== The Five Methods ==
Louis Montfort's The Secret of the Rosary has the first and second methods. The first method is described above. In the second method a word or two is added to each Hail Mary of the decade. The third method combined elements of the first and second, and was made for the use of the Daughters of Wisdom. The fourth method incorporates a small reflection for each bead, usually associated with the mystery of the decade. The fifth method focuses its reflections on the rosary itself: its power, history, and prayers; in what manner it ought to be said (slowly and calmly, etc.); and objections towards praying the rosary to beware of, such as, "One can be saved without praying the rosary."
