= Consecration and entrustment to Mary =

Catholic act of devotion

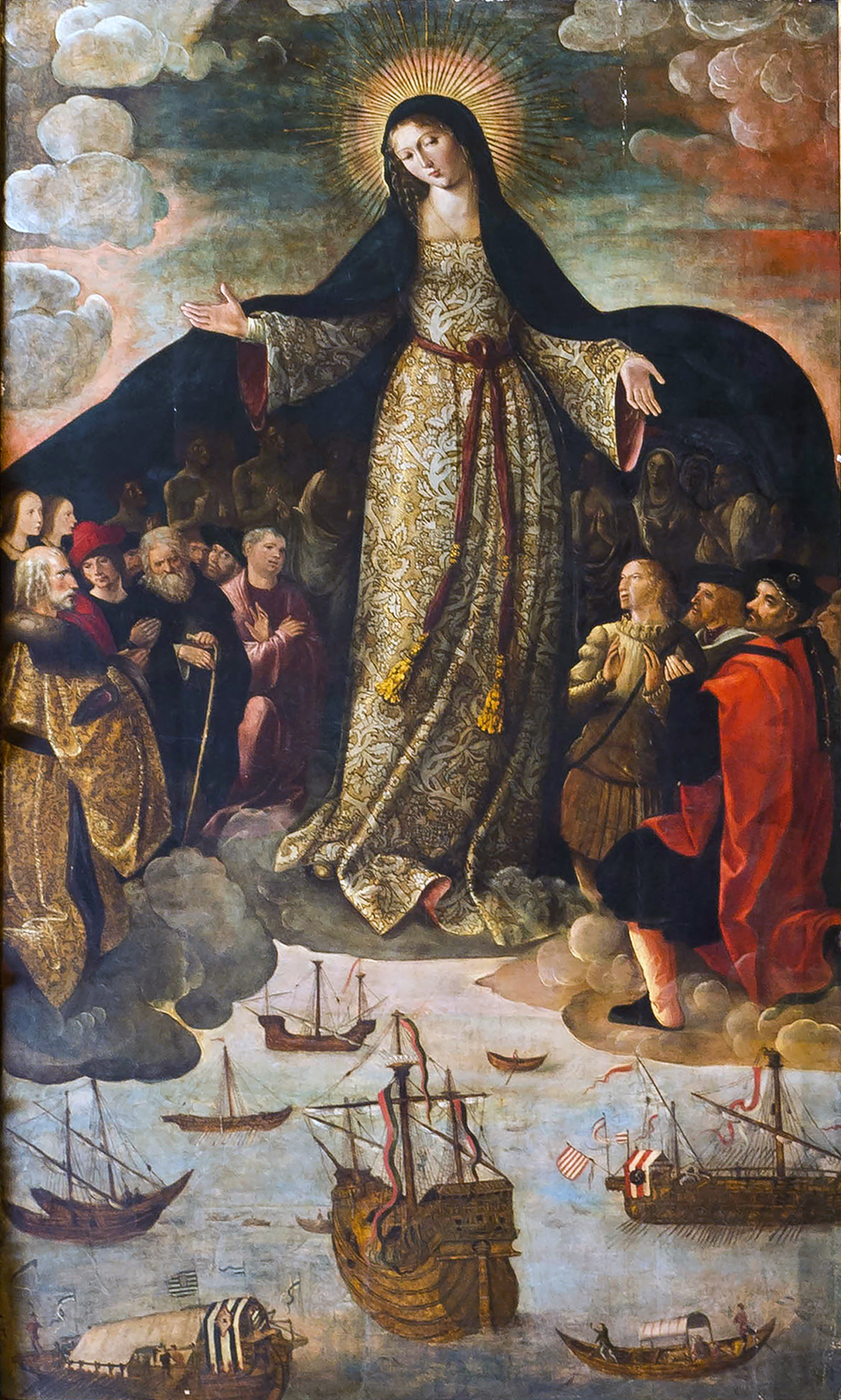
The Blessed Virgin Mary venerated as The Virgin of the Navigators, 1531–1536, with her protective mantle covering those entrusted to her

The consecration and entrustment to the Virgin Mary is a personal or collective act of Marian devotion among Catholics, with the Latin terms oblatio, servitus, commendatio and dedicatio being used in this context. Consecration is an act by which a person is dedicated to a sacred service, or an act which separates an object, location or region from a common and profane mode to one for sacred use. The Congregation for Divine Worship and the Discipline of the Sacraments clarifies that in this context, "It should be recalled, however, that the term "consecration" is used here in a broad and non-technical sense: the expression is use of 'consecrating children to Our Lady', by which is intended placing children under her protection and asking her maternal blessing for them".

Consecration to the Virgin Mary by Catholics has taken place from three perspectives: personal, societal and regional, and under a number of different titles: the Immaculate Conception, to the Immaculate Heart of Mary, or more recently to Mary, Mother of the Church. Early in the 20th century, Maximilian Kolbe, called the "Apostle of Consecration to Mary", began a vigorous programme of promoting consecration to the Immaculata. In Catholic teachings, consecration to Mary does not diminish or substitute the love of God, but enhances it, for all consecration is ultimately made to God. Theologian Garrigou-Lagrange designated personal consecration to Mary as the highest level among Marian devotions.

Pope John Paul II's motto, Totus Tuus ("totally yours"), reflected his personal consecration to Mary. He consecrated the entire world to the Immaculate Heart of Mary.

== History and development ==
The beginnings of the notion of "belonging to Mary" can be seen in the writings of Ephrem the Syrian in the 4th century, and a form of personal consecration to Mary dates back to the 5th century, where its practitioners were called "servants of Mary" and the practice was sometimes referred to as "holy servitude". However, the first consistent and repeated use of the concept of consecration to Mary was perhaps by Ildephonsus of Toledo in the 7th century, and Pope John VII also referred to it in the 8th century.

The notion that consecration to Mary is linked with consecration to Christ and has an ultimate Christocentric goal was already present in the 7th century writings of Ildephonsus, when he wrote: "What is delivered up to the Mother rebounds to the Son; thus passes to the King the honor that is rendered in the service of the Queen."

In the 8th century, John Damascene continued the theme of consecration to Mary, and when he wrote "to you we consecrate (anathemenoi) our minds, our souls and our bodies, in a word our very selves" he used the Greek term anathemenoi which indicates "the setting aside for sacred use".

The act of consecration of cities and regions dates back at least to the 9th century, when Abbo Cernuus of Saint-Germain-des-Prés composed a poem in which he attributed the failure of the Vikings in the Siege of Paris (885–886) to the consecration of the city to the Virgin Mary, and her protection over it. During the Medieval period, abbeys, towns and cities began to consecrate themselves to the Virgin Mary to seek her protection. In the 12th century Cîteaux Abbey in France used the motif of the "protective mantle" of the Virgin Mary which shielded the kneeling abbots and abbesses. In the 13th century Caesarius of Heisterbach was also aware of this motif, which eventually led to the iconography of the Virgin of Mercy.

Although previous saints had discussed the notion of consecration, it was only in 11th century France that Odilo at the Cluny Abbey began to spread the formal practice of personal consecration to Mary. In the 12th century, the Cistercian orders began consecrating themselves to Mary, first individually and then as a group, and this practice then spread to the Benedictines and the Carmelites.

The 17th century also saw the adoption of the custom of consecrating the month of May to the Blessed Virgin. During the 18th and 19th centuries the traditions of Marian consecration grew and by 1860 First Communion in France included an act of consecration to the Virgin Mary. By this time Marian consecrations had spread beyond continental Europe and in England Frederick Faber had composed a hymn of consecration to the Virgin Mary which included a petition to her motherly role.

Since the 19th century, devotions and consecrations to the Immaculate Heart of Mary have been encouraged by several popes including Pius IX, Pius XII and John Paul II.

== Personal consecration ==
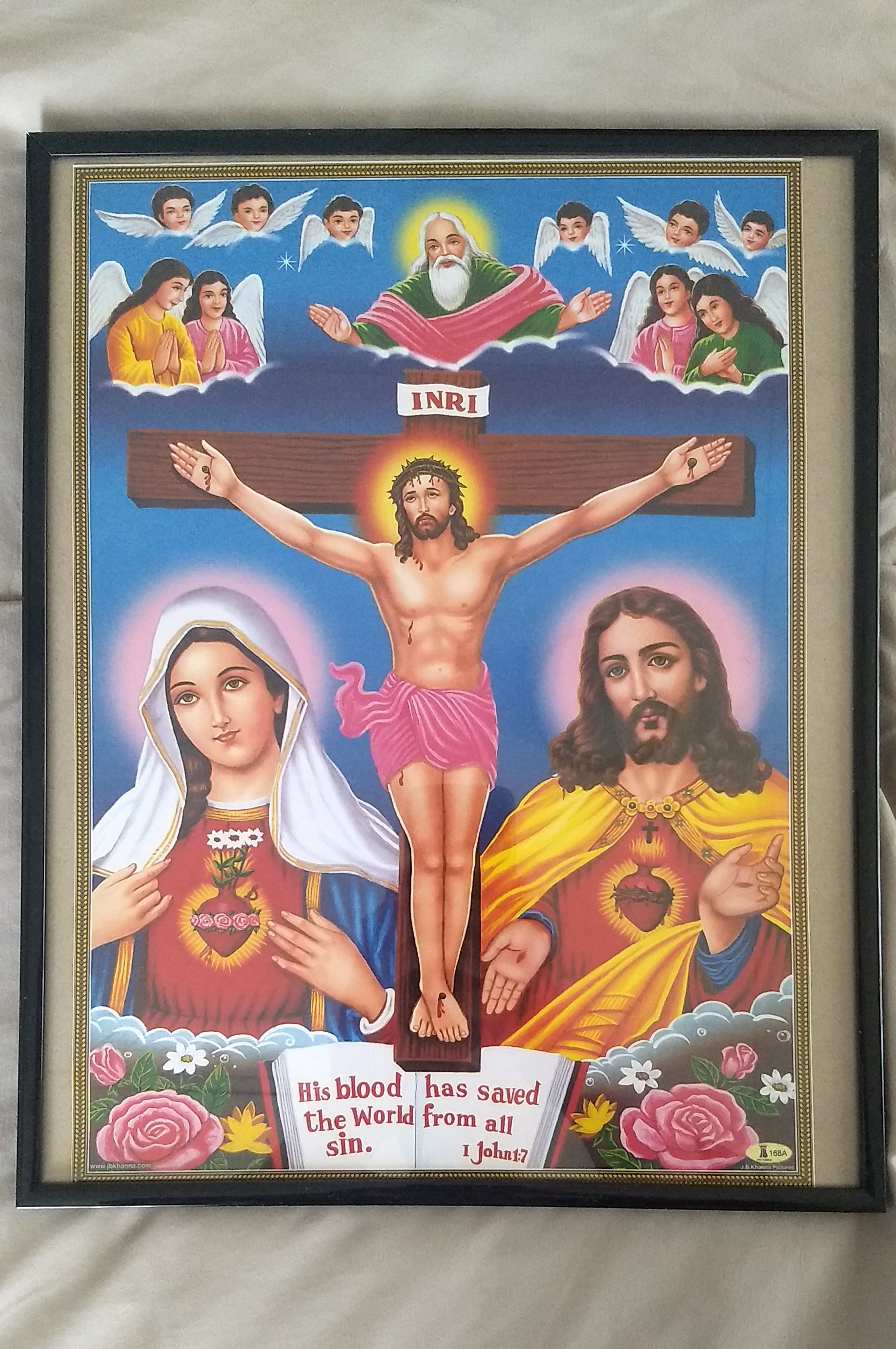
Sacred image used for the Consecration to the Sacred Heart of Jesus and the Immaculate Heart of Mary

Theologian Reginald Garrigou-Lagrange, a professor at the Angelicum, analyzed various forms and stages of Marian devotions. He designated personal consecration to Mary as the highest level among these devotions. In his theological analysis, Marian devotions are categorized into stages, from beginner to advanced, as follows:

- Occasional prayer, e.g. praying the Hail Mary from time to time.
- Regular and daily devotion, e.g. the devout recitation of the Rosary on a daily basis.
- A formal act of consecration to Mary, and living in habitual dependence on her, as a means of uniting with Christ.

The theology of personal consecration to Mary was further explained by Pope John Paul II in Redemptoris Mater where, building on John 19:27, he stated that the word "home" refers to the spiritual and inner life of believers, and "to take Mary into one's home" signifies a filial entrustment to her as mother in every aspect of life. John Paul II suggested the Apostle John as an example of how every Christian should respond to the gift of the spiritual motherhood of Mary.

=== Louis de Montfort's Total Consecration to Jesus through Mary ===
The practice of consecration to Jesus through Mary was further promoted in the 18th century following the rediscovery of the writings of the 17th century priest Louis de Montfort. The heart of Montfort's classic work True Devotion to Mary is a formal act of consecration to Mary, so through her, one can be consecrated to Christ. For Montfort, consecration begins a gradual process of sanctification in which a person's focus turns away from self-love and towards God through Mary. In Montfort's view different individuals reach different levels along this scale, depending on their efforts and purity of intentions. Montfort's classification of the multiple levels of spiritual progress is similar to the "spiritual dwelling places" described by Teresa of Avila in the Interior Castle. Yet Montfort's view differs from Teresa's contemporary, John of the Cross in that Montfort sees the Marian path to Jesus as far more positive, encouraging and smooth than the path followed by John in the poem Dark Night of the Soul.

Montfort's concept of consecration was influenced by Henri Boudon's book Dieu seul: le Saint esclavage de l'admirable Mère de Dieu (Only God, the Holy Slavery of the admirable Mother of God). By reading Boudon, Montfort concluded that any consecration is ultimately made to "God Alone", for only God merits the loving servitude of man. Later, "God Alone" became the motto of Montfort. Montfort's approach followed Boudon very closely, but differed on one element: while Boudon's consecration was founded on the Queenship of Mary, Montfort approach was based on the divine maternity.

Pope John Paul II stated that as a young seminarian he had read and reread Montfort many times and "understood that I could not exclude the Lord's Mother from my life without neglecting the will of God-Trinity".

=== The Immaculate Heart of Mary ===
Francis de Sales began to write on the "perfections of the Heart of Mary" as the model of love for God in the early parts of the 17th century and his work influenced Jean Eudes, who then developed the joint devotion to the Hearts of Jesus and Mary. Two factors that helped the rapid progress of the devotion were the introduction of the Miraculous Medal by Catherine Labouré in 1830 and the establishment at Notre-Dame-des-Victoires, Paris of the Archconfraternity of the Immaculate Heart of Mary, Refuge of Sinners. In 1838 Father Desgenettes, the pastor of Notre-Dame-des-Victoires, organized the Association in honor of the Holy and Immaculate Heart of Mary, which Pope Gregory XVI made a confraternity the same year. In July, 1855, the Congregation of Rites approved the Office and Mass for the Immaculate Heart.

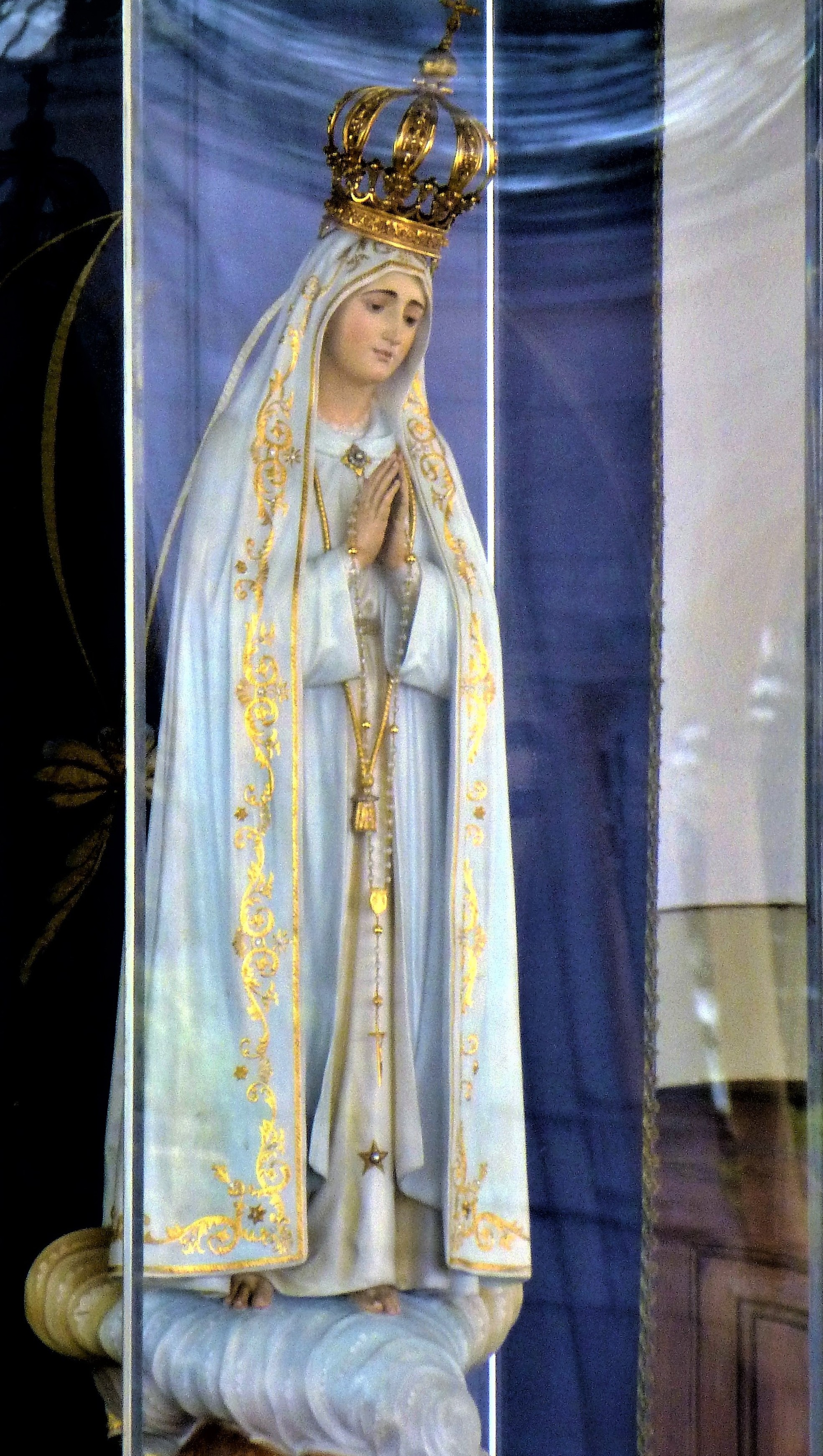
Our Lady of Fatima

Another driving force for devotions and consecrations to the Immaculate Heart of Mary appeared in the 1917 messages of Our Lady of Fátima. The three children who reported the messages of Marian apparitions at Fátima referred to the Immaculate Heart. The third apparition reported at Fátima on 13 July 1917, specifically encouraged devotions and consecrations for the triumph of the Immaculate Heart. Although the reports of the Fátima apparitions were initially met with skepticism, they grew in popularity and were approved by the Holy See in 1930.

On 13 May 1967, the 50th anniversary of Our Lady of Fatima, Pope Paul VI visited Fatima, Portugal, and issued the Apostolic Exhortation Signum Magnum ("a great sign") in which he asked "all sons of the Church to renew their consecration to the Immaculate Heart of Mary". In 1986, when addressing the participants in the 1986 International Theological Symposium on the Alliance of the Hearts of Jesus and Mary, Pope John Paul II stated: "Our act of consecration to the Immaculate Heart of Mary refers ultimately to the Heart of her Son, for as the Mother of Christ she is wholly united to his redemptive mission. As at the marriage feast of Cana, when she said 'Do whatever he tells you', Mary directs all things to her Son, who answers our prayers and forgives our sins."

=== The Immaculata ===
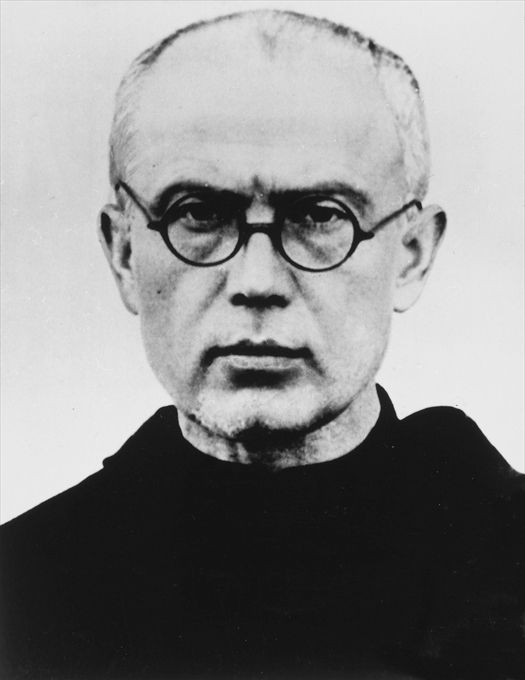
Fr. Maximilian Kolbe 1939

In 1854 Pope Pius IX defined the dogma of the Immaculate Conception of the Blessed Virgin Mary in the apostolic constitution Ineffabilis Deus. This greatly helped the spread of devotions and consecrations to the Immaculata.

In the early part of the 20th century, Maximilian Kolbe began his efforts to promote consecration to the Immaculata, partly relying on the 1858 messages of Our Lady of Lourdes. He argued that since Mary is Immaculate, by her very nature she is the perfect instrument of the Holy Spirit in the mediation of all graces, given that "every grace is a gift of the Father through his Son by the Holy Spirit".

Kolbe founded the monastery of Niepokalanów ("City of the Immaculate Mother of God") and published Militia Immaculatae in multiple languages, which eventually reached a circulation of 750,000 copies a month, until it was stopped when Kolbe was sent to the Auschwitz concentration camp. Kolbe's efforts in promoting consecration to the Immaculata made him known as the "Apostle of Consecration to Mary".

== Societal consecration ==
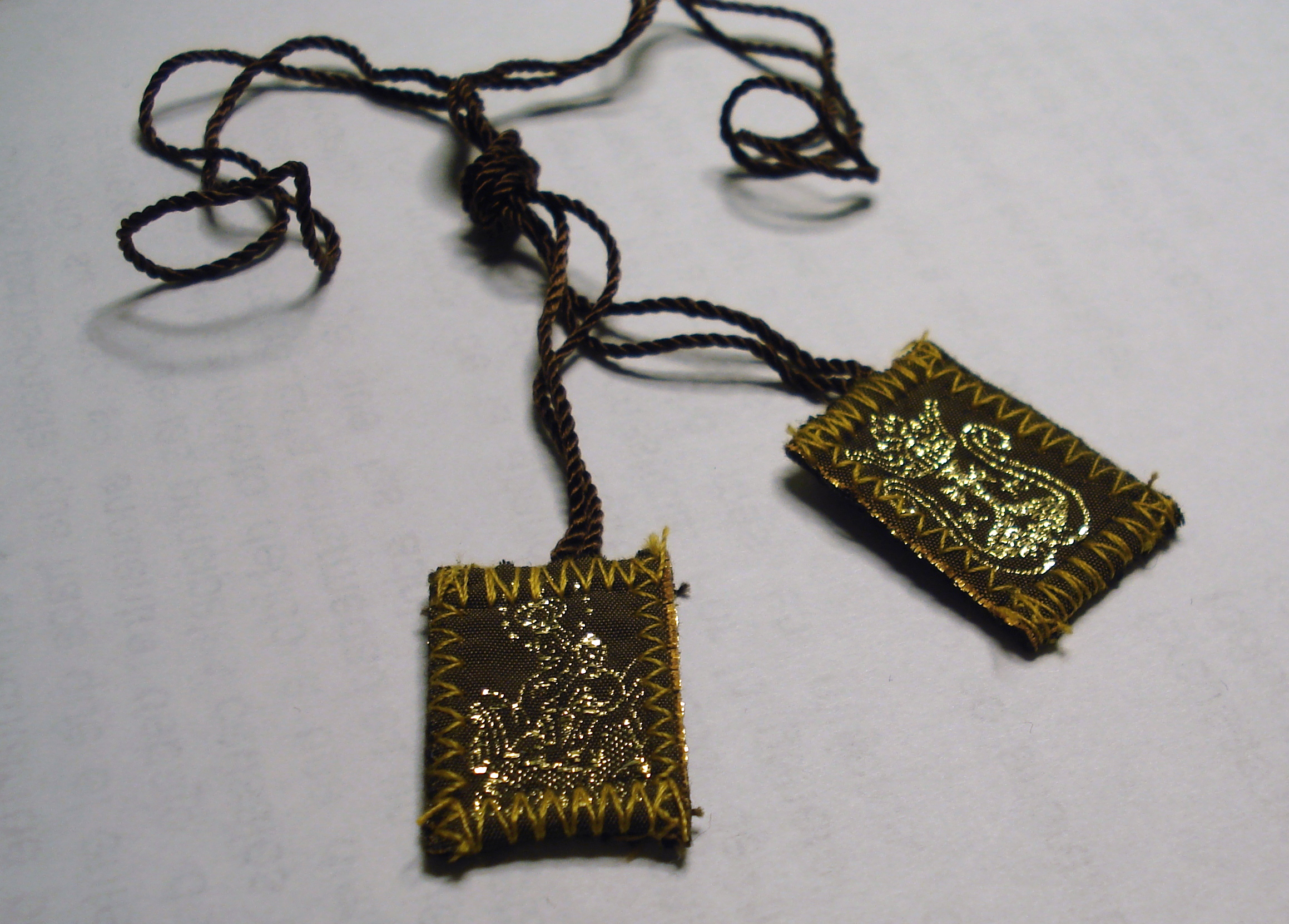
The Brown scapular has been worn by Carmelites for centuries as a sign of their consecration to Mary.

For many centuries, the Carmelites have worn the Brown Scapular as a sign of their consecration to Mary, and her protection over them. In the year 1304, the Servite Order (Servants of Mary), whose focus was on the sorrows of Mary, was approved by the Holy See.

Over the centuries, a number of Marian movements and societies have been consecrated to the Virgin Mary, e.g. the fourth vow taken by the Marianist Fathers, whose order was formed in the 18th century, during the French Revolution includes a consecration to the Virgin Mary. In the 1948 Apostolic Constitution Bis Saeculari Pope Pius XII encouraged Marian consecrations by the Marian societies such as Sodality of Our Lady.

On Sunday, 8 October 2000, upon the completion of the ceremonies for the Jubilee of the Bishops, Pope John Paul II and the bishops consecrated and entrusted themselves and the Catholic Church in the new millennium to Mary.

On 12 May 2010 at the Church of the Most Holy Trinity in Fátima, on the occasion of the 10th anniversary of the beatification of Jacinta and Francisco Marto Pope Benedict XVI consecrated all priests to the Immaculate Heart of Mary.

== Consecration of locations and regions ==
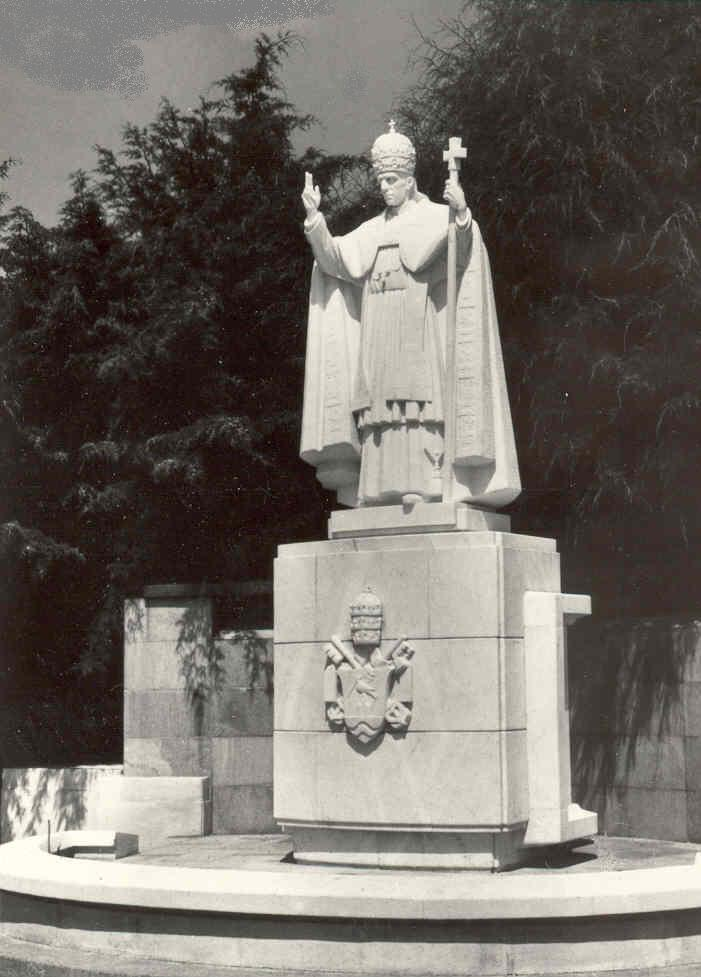
Statue of Pope Pius XII in Fátima, Portugal, representing the Marian consecration

The consecration of cities and regions to the Virgin Mary dates back at least to the 9th century, and during the feuding Medieval period, abbeys, towns and cities began to consecrate themselves to the Virgin Mary to seek her protection. In the 17th century France was consecrated to the Virgin Mary by Louis XIII and a number of other countries such as Portugal followed that trend.

In the 1917 purported apparitions of Our Lady of Fatima, the Virgin Mary is said to have specifically asked for the consecration of Russia to her Immaculate Heart.

On 31 October 1942, Pius XII made a solemn act of consecration of the Catholic Church and the whole world to the Immaculate Heart of Mary, joined by the bishops of Portugal, gathered at the Cathedral in Lisbon. The consecration was performed via a Portuguese radio broadcast, and then renewed on 8 December 1942, in Rome. In July 1952 Pope Pius XII specifically performed the Consecration of Russia to the Immaculate Heart of Mary via the Apostolic Letter Sacro Vergente.

According to author Edward Sri, given the emphasis Pius XII had placed on the Queenship of Mary, the consecration emphasized the importance Pius XII placed on the powerful role of Mary as an intercessor and a protector of humanity. Mariologist Gabriel Roschini wrote that the 1942 consecration of humanity to Mary can be viewed as an apex for Marian culture.

On 13 May 1982 in Fatima Portugal, Pope John Paul II again consecrated the world to the Immaculate Heart of Mary and said: "Consecrating the world to the Immaculate Heart of Mary means drawing near, through the mother's intercession, to the very fountain of life that sprang from Golgotha. This fountain pours forth unceasingly redemption and grace. In it reparation is made continually for the sins of the world. It is a ceaseless source of new life and holiness".

On 25 March 1984, Pope John Paul II again performed the solemn consecration of the world to the Immaculate Heart of Mary before the statue of the Virgin Mary of Fatima brought to Saint Peter's Square in Vatican City for the ceremony. In his "program of Marian consecration and entrustment" John Paul II considered consecration to the Immaculate Heart of Mary as Divinely intended to complement the consecration to the sacred Heart of Jesus.

Pope Pius XII's two consecrations were made in October 1942 and July 1952 and those of John Paul II in May 1982 and March 1984. This paralleled the consecration of the world to the Sacred Heart of Jesus by Pope Leo XIII, discussed in the encyclical Annum sacrum of May 1899.

On 28 June 2003 John Paul II entrusted Europe to the Virgin Mary, and renewed that entrustment again on 31 August 2003.

During the ongoing conflict, on 25 March 2022 Pope Francis consecrated Russia and Ukraine to the Immaculate Heart of Mary in union with bishops from all over the world to implore an end to the war.

=== Canada ===
Early Jesuit missionaries consecrated their missions to Mary Immaculate. In 2017, the Canadian Conference of Catholic Bishops suggested local ordinaries consecrate their respective dioceses to the Immaculate Heart of Mary on 1 July (or another date "that might better suit the local pastoral situation") to mark the 150th anniversary of the Canadian Confederation. Those taking part included:

- Archdiocese of Ottawa (1 July 2017, Abp. Terrence Thomas Prendergast)
- Bishop Gary Michael Gordon) of Victoria
- Archbishop Martin William Currie of Saint John's
- Archbishop Richard William Smith of Edmonton
- Bishop William Terrence McGrattan of Calgary
- Cardinal Thomas Christopher Collins) of Toronto
- Archbishop John Michael Miller of Vancouver
- Diocesan Administrator Kevin McGee of the Diocese of Saskatoon
- Cardinal Gérald Cyprien Lacroix of Québec (2 July 2017)
- Bishop Luc-André Bouchard of Trois-Rivières (15 August 2017)
- Bishop André Gazaille of Nicolet (8 December 2017)

All the bishops of Canada participated jointly in the consecration of the country to the Blessed Mother during the CCCB Plenary Assembly on 6 September 2017. On 1 May 2020, members of the CCCB consecrated Canada to Mary, under the title Mother of the Church. Bishops were invited to participate in a 1 May 2020 re-consecration of their dioceses. Among those participating was Bishop Mark Hagemoen of Saskatoon.

=== England and Wales ===
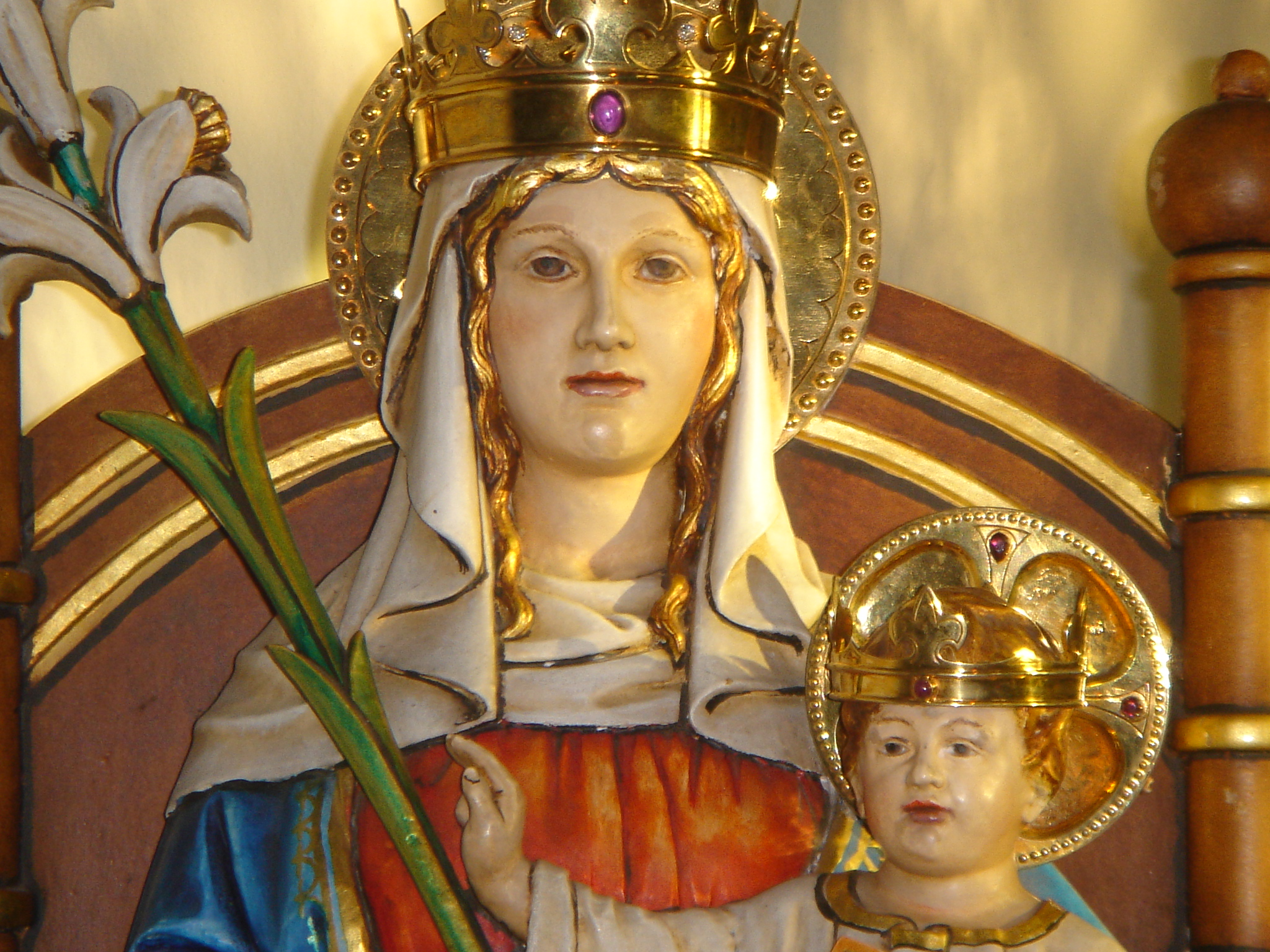
Our Lady of Walsingham

The title of "Mary's Dowry" as applied to England dates back to Edward the Confessor, and was formally proclaimed in 1399 by Archbishop of Canterbury Thomas Arundel. Eight years before, during the Peasants' Revolt of 1381, the fourteen-year-old King Richard II of England had entrusted his kingdom to the Virgin Mary in a ceremony at Westminster Abbey. The bishops of England consecrated the country to Mary in 1893. The re-dedication of England as the "Dowry of Mary" took place 29 March 2020 at the shrine of Our Lady of Walsingham.

=== Latin America and Caribbean and the Americas ===
"In 1945, at the urging of bishops from the U.S. and Canada, Ven. Pius XII bestowed on her the title Empress of the Americas." On Easter Sunday 2020, CELAM, the Latin American and Caribbean bishops’ conference, consecrated Latin America and the Caribbean to Our Lady of Guadalupe "asking her for health and an end to the pandemic."

- Ecuador -"the Most Holy Heart of Mary" (1892)

=== United States ===
In 1792, Bishop Carroll of Baltimore, consecrated the United States to Mary under the title of the Immaculate Conception. In 1846, bishops attending the Sixth Provincial Council in Baltimore chose Mary under that title as the country's patroness.

Like the Canadian bishops, on 1 May 2020, Archbishop José Horacio Gómez, president of the U.S. Conference of Catholic Bishops, led a "Renewal of the Consecration of the United States of America to the Blessed Virgin Mary" under the title "Mary, Mother of the Church" at Our Lady of the Angels Cathedral in Los Angeles. That same day, a rite of consecration was similarly held by Archbishop Gregory at the Basilica of the National Shrine of the Immaculate Conception in Washington.

Archbishop Gomez also sent a letter to the U.S. bishops inviting them to join in the consecration. Among those joining in the consecration to Mary, Mother of the Church was Bishop Glen Provost of the Diocese of Lake Charles, and Bishop Lawrence T. Persicoof the Roman Catholic Diocese of Erie.

On 6 May 2018, Bishop Gregory Parkes of the Diocese of Saint Petersburg renewed a dedication of the diocese to the Immaculate Heart of Mary previously done by Bishop Thomas Larkin on Friday, 13 May 1983 "in response to a request from the Holy Father, John Paul II."

Separately, Pope Pius XII gave the title "Empress of the Americas" to the apparition of Our Lady of Guadalupe on 12 October 1945, which naturally includes the United States of America. Pope Pius XII both in Spanish as well as in English clearly stated that she is Empress of the Americas, (for reference please read further) not just for Latin Americans or for any particular nation but for all people in the South and North American continents.

=== Consecration of Russia and Our Lady of Fatima ===
Pope Pius XII, Paul VI, Pope John Paul II, and Pope Francis have consecrated Russia to the Immaculate Heart.

=== Consecration of the Holy Land and the Middle East ===
During the Gaza war, on 29 October 2023 Cardinal Pierbattista Pizzaballa consecrated the Holy Land and the Middle East to the Immaculate Heart of Mary imploring the gift of peace

== Dioceses consecrated to the Immaculate Heart of Mary ==
=== Holy See ===
- Personal Ordinariate of the Chair of Saint Peter (15 October 2017, Bp. Steven J. Lopes)

=== North America ===
==== United States ====
- Archdiocese of Atlanta, Francis Edward Hyland 1956; Wilton Daniel Gregory, 12 December 2007.
- Diocese of Springfield-Cape Girardeau, Missouri (25 March 2010, Bp. James Vann Johnston)
- Diocese of Winona, Minnesota (8 September 2011, Bp. John M. Quinn)
- Archdiocese of Oklahoma City, Oklahoma (13 October 2013, Abp. Paul S. Coakley)
- Archdiocese of Portland, Oregon (28 June 2014, Abp. Alexander K. Sample)
- Diocese of Fort Wayne-South Bend, Indiana (15 August 2014, Bp. Kevin C. Rhoades)
- Diocese of Albany, New York (4 April 2016, Bp. Edward B. Scharfenberger)
- Archdiocese of Milwaukee, Wisconsin (7 October 2016, Abp. Jerome E. Listecki)
- Diocese of Madison, Wisconsin (7 October 2016, Bp. Robert Morlino)
- Diocese of La Crosse, Wisconsin (7 October 2016, Bp. William P. Callahan)
- Diocese of Superior, Wisconsin (7 October 2016, Bp. James P. Powers)
- Archdiocese of Detroit, Michigan (13 May 2017, Abp. Allen H. Vigneron)
- Diocese of Paterson, New Jersey (13 May 2017, Bp. Arthur J. Serratelli)
- Diocese of Fargo, North Dakota (13-14 May 2017, Bp. John T. Folda)
- Diocese of San Angelo, Texas (27 September 2017, Bp. Michael J. Sis)
- Diocese of Jackson, Mississippi (8 October 2017, Bp. Joseph Kopacz)
- Archdiocese of Louisville, Kentucky (8 October 2017, Abp. Joseph E. Kurtz)
- Archdiocese of Denver, Colorado (13 October 2017, Abp. Samuel J. Aquila)
- Archdiocese of Saint Paul and Minneapolis, Minnesota (13 October 2017, Abp. Bernard Hebda)
- Archdiocese of Philadelphia, Pennsylvania (15 October 2017, Abp. Charles J. Chaput)
- Diocese of Colorado Springs, Colorado (15 October 2017, Bp. Michael J. Sheridan)
- Diocese of Santa Rosa, California (8-12 December 2017, Bp. Robert Vasa)
- Diocese of Austin, Texas (10 December 2017, Bp. Joe S. Vásquez)
- Diocese of Venice, Florida (24 December 2017, Bp. Frank Joseph Dewane)
- Diocese of Kalamazoo, Michigan (8 December 2018, Bp. Paul J. Bradley)
- Diocese of Wilmington, Delaware (19 August 2019, Bp. William Francis Malooly)
- Diocese of Buffalo, New York (2 February 2020, Apostolic Administrator Edward B. Scharfenberger)
- Diocese of Salt Lake City, Utah (27 March 2020 – Bp. Oscar A. Solis)
- Diocese of Evansville, Indiana (12 September 2020 - Bp. Joseph M. Siegel)
- Archdiocese of New Orleans, Louisiana (27 March 2022 - Bp. Gregory Michael Aymond)

==== Canada ====
- Archdiocese of Montréal (23 November 2013, Abp. Christian Lépine)

==== Mexico ====
- Archdiocese of Monterrey (23 November 2013, Abp. Rogelio Cabrera López)
- Archdiocese of Mexico City (12 December 2014, Card. Juan Sandoval Íñiguez)

=== Europe ===
==== Poland ====
- All the 42 Polish dioceses (9 September 2017, Abp. Stanisław Gądecki together with all the bishops of Poland)

==== Netherlands ====
- All the Dutch dioceses (13 May 2017, Card. Willem J. Eijk together with all the bishops of the Netherlands)

==== Italy ====
- Diocese of Chioggia, Veneto (10 October 1954, Bp. Giovanni Battista Piasentini)
- Diocese of Reggio Emilia-Guastalla, Emilia-Romagna (13 May 2017, Bp. Massimo Camisasca)
- Diocese of Pavia, Lombardy (13 May 2017, Bp. Corrado Sanguineti)
- Diocese of Carpi, Emilia-Romagna (16 September 2017, Bp. Francesco Cavina)
- Diocese of Ischia, Campania (13 October 2017, Bp. Pietro Lagnese)
- Diocese of Cesena-Sarsina, Emilia-Romagna (8 December 2017, Bp. Douglas Regattieri)
- Diocese of Ariano Irpino-Lacedonia, Campania (8 December 2017, Bp. Sergio Melillo)
- Diocese of San Miniato, Tuscany (12 May 2017, Bp. Andrea Migliavacca)
- Archdiocese of Siracusa, Sicily (1 September 2018, Abp. Salvatore Pappalardo)
- Archdiocese of Vercelli, Piedmont (13 October 2018, Abp. Marco Arnolfo)
- Archdiocese of Potenza, Basilicata (30 ottobre 2018, Abp. Salvatore Ligorio)

==== France ====
- Diocese of Fréjus-Toulon (18 May 2008, Bp. Dominique Rey)
- Diocese of Bayonne, Lescar and Oloron (8 June 2014, Bp. Marc Aillet)
- Diocese of Angoulême (7 May 2017, Bp. Hervé Gosselin)
- Archdiocese of Bordeaux (13 May 2017, Card. Jean-Pierre Ricard)
- Archdiocese of Avignon (8 December 2017, Abp. Jean-Pierre Cattenoz)
- Archdiocese of Aix-en-Provence and Arles (8 December 2017, Abp. Christophe Dufour)
- Diocese of Vannes (8 December 2017, Bp. Raymond Centène)
- Diocese of Perpignan-Elne (8 December 2017, Bp. Norbert Turini)
- Diocese of Tulle (30 September 2018, Bp. Francis Bestion)
- Diocese of Nevers (8 September 2018, Bp. Thierry Brac de la Perrière)
- Diocese of Séez (13 May 2018, Bp. Jacques Habert)

==== Spain ====
- Diocese of Alcalá de Henares (12 June 2010, Bp. Juan Antonio Reig Plá)
- Diocese of Cuenca (8 December 2015, Bp. José María Yanguas Sanz)
- Archdiocese of Valladolid (10 June 2017, Abp. Luis Javier Argüello García)
- Diocese of San Sebastián (14 May 2017, Bp. José Ignacio Munilla)
- Archdiocese of Valencia (28 June 2018, Card. Antonio Cañizares Llovera)
- Diocese of Getafe (7 December 2018, Bp. Ginés Ramón García Beltrán)

==== Germany ====
- Archdiocese of Freiburg (15 August 2017, Abp. Stephan Burger)

==== Austria ====
- Diocese of Linz (8 December 2015, Bp. Ludwig Schwarz)

==== England ====
- Diocese of Shrewsbury (13 October 2013, Bp. Mark Davies)

==== Scotland ====
- Archdiocese of Saint Andrews and Edinburgh (20 October 2017, Abp. Leo Cushley)
- Roman Catholic Diocese of Motherwell (20 May 2017) Consecration performed by Bishop Joseph Toal at the Cathedral of Our Lady of Good Aid, Motherwell.

==== Finland ====
- Diocese of Helsinki (8 December 2005, Bp. Józef Wróbel)

=== South America ===
==== Venezuela ====
- Archdiocese of Maracaibo (13 October 2017, Abp. Ubaldo Ramón Santana Sequera)
- Diocese of Machiques (8 December 2017, Bp. Ramiro Díaz)

==== Colombia ====
- Archdiocese of Barranquilla (9 June 2018, Abp. Pablo Emiro Salas Anteliz)

==== Uruguay ====
- Archdiocese of Montevideo (8 October 2017, Card. Daniel Sturla)

==== Brazil ====
- Diocese of São Luiz de Cáceres (22 May 2016, Bp. Antônio Emídio Vilar)

==== Argentina ====
- Archdiocese of Rosario (1 August 2019, Bp. Eduardo Eliseo Martín)

=== Oceania ===
==== Australia ====
- Archdiocese of Hobart, Tasmania (13 May 2017, Abp. Julian Porteous)

==== New Zealand ====
- Archdiocese of Wellington (8 December 2016, Card. John Atcherley Dew)

==== Samoa ====
- Archdiocese of Samoa-Apia (7 December 2007, Abp. Alapati Lui Mataeliga)

=== Asia ===
==== Philippines ====
- All the 89 Filipino dioceses (4 May 2018, Card. Romulo Valles together with all the bishops of Philippines)

==== India ====
- Archdiocese of Bombay (13 May 2017, Card. Oswald Gracias)
- Archdiocese of Goa and Daman (13 May 2017, Abp. Filipe Neri Ferrão)

=== Africa ===
==== Angola ====
- Diocese of Uíje (23 April 2017, Bp. Emílio Sumbelelo)

== Prayers of consecration ==
A number of different prayers may be used as part of the consecration to the Virgin Mary. The "Act of Consecration to the Immaculate Heart of Mary" appears in the official Raccolta book of indulgenced prayers.

The prayer originally composed by Louis de Montfort is as follows:

Today, I, a faithless sinner, renew in your hands my Baptismal vows; I renounce Satan forever, his pomps and works; and I give myself entirely to Jesus Christ, the Incarnate Wisdom, and will carry my cross after Him all the days of my life, and will be more faithful to Him than I have ever been. With the entire heavenly court as my witness, I choose you this day for my Mother. I deliver and consecrate myself to you, my body and soul, myself, both interior and exterior, and the worth of my good actions, past, present and future; leaving to you the total right of disposing of me, and all that belongs to me, according to your wish, for the greater glory of God in time and in eternity.

The prayer used by Pope John Paul II as his act of entrustment of all Bishops to Mary was considerably longer. It began with John 19:26 and included the entrustment as follows: "Here we stand before you to entrust to your maternal care ourselves, the Church, the entire world. Plead for us with your beloved Son that he may give us in abundance the Holy Spirit, the Spirit of truth which is the fountain of life."

== See also ==
- Catholic devotions
- Marian devotions
- Mother of God (Roman Catholic)
- Act of Consecration to the Sacred Heart of Jesus
- The Consecration to St. Joseph created by Father Donald Calloway

== Sources ==
- Joseph Jaja, 2005, The Mystical Experience and Doctrine of St. Louis-Marie Grignion de Montfort, Ignatius Press. ISBN 978-88-7839-030-0
