= Secret of Mary =

Secret of Mary is a book by Saint Louis de Montfort on the Roman Catholic theme of devotion to the Blessed Virgin Mary.

== Description ==
The book is published by Tan Books but is also available free online. It complements de Montfort's other books, Secret of the Rosary and True Devotion to Mary.

Saint Louis de Montfort's books attracted attention in the 20th century when in an address to the Montfortian Fathers, Pope John Paul II said that reading one of de Montfort's books had been a "decisive turning point" in his life.

== See also ==
- Saint Louis de Montfort
- Company of Mary
- Daughters of Wisdom
