= Liesse-Notre-Dame =

- Commune
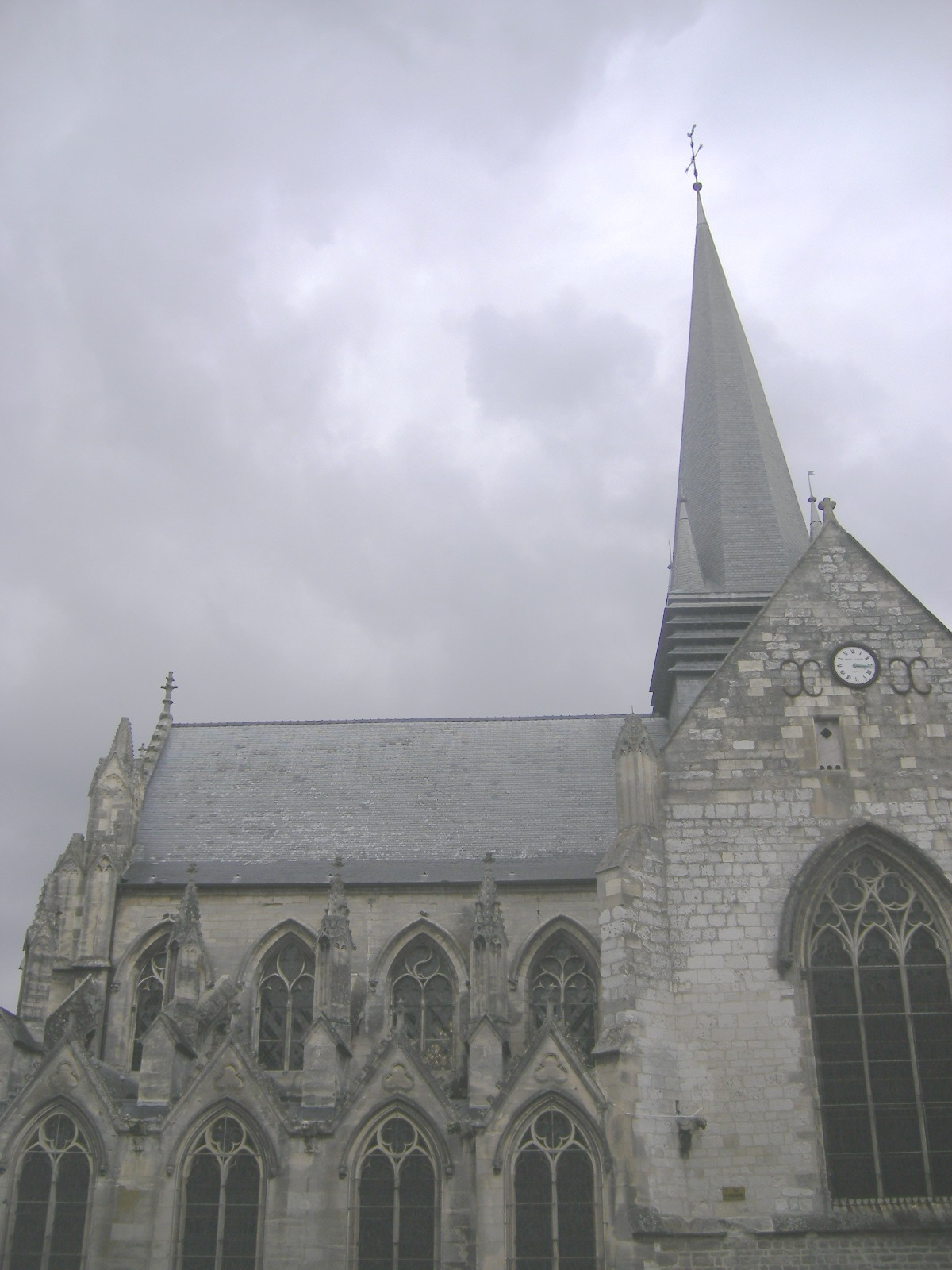
- The church of Liesse-Notre-Dame

- Coat of arms
- Location of Liesse-Notre-Dame
- Location within France Location within Hauts-de-France
- Coordinates: 49°36′37″N 3°48′18″E
- Country: France
- Region: Hauts-de-France
- Department: Aisne
- Arrondissement: Laon
- Canton: Villeneuve-sur-Aisne
- Intercommunality: Champagne Picarde

Government
  - Mayor (2026–32): Pascal Becquet
- Area^{1}: 9.96 km^{2} (3.85 sq mi)
- Elevation: 73 m (240 ft)
- Highest elevation: 87 m (285 ft)
- Lowest elevation: 68 m (223 ft)
- Population (2023): 1,264
  - Density: 127/km^{2} (329/sq mi)
- Time zone: UTC+01:00 (CET)
  - Summer (DST): UTC+02:00 (CEST)
- INSEE/Postal code: 02430 /02350
- ^{1} French Land Register data, which excludes lakes, ponds, glaciers > 1 km^{2} (0.386 sq mi or 247 acres) and river estuaries.

Liesse-Notre-Dame (French pronunciation: [ljɛs nɔtʁ dam], before 1988: Liesse) is a commune in the Aisne department in Hauts-de-France in northern France. In the Middle Ages, the village near Laon developed around the cult of the Black Virgin, known as Notre-Dame de Liesse (Our Lady of Liesse, which happens to be French for Joy/Jubilation). Pope Pius IX granted the Marian image a decree of canonical coronation on 18 August 1857.

== Basilica of Notre-Dame de Liesse ==
The basilica was built during the late thirteenth and early fourteenth centuries. According to ancient documents, the first shrine of Liesse was built by the pious Bartholomew of Vir, with the stones left over from the construction of Laon Cathedral. The portal and façade were constructed in the fifteenth century by Bishop of Laon, Charles of Luxembourg (1473–1509), son of the Count of Saint Pol, Constable of France under Louis XI. Formerly one of the portal stones were engraved with the inscription:

As a monument of their piety and their gratitude to the Virgin Mary, this holy temple was built in 1134 by the knights of Eppes. It was rebuilt in 1384 and enlarged in 1480."

In November 1568, the troops of the Protestant Prince of Orange looted the village and its church, and having broken the statues and removed the bells, set fire to the church, reducing the bell tower to ashes. Restoration commenced nine years later.

At a young age, Madame Acarie was brought to Liesse in 1572 by her parents, as was the child Henri Boudon. It was a favorite shrine of Princess Henrietta Maria of France. Jean-Jacques Olier visited in 1632. In 1686, after Trinity Sunday, 1686, after Jean-Baptiste de La Salle and the Brothers took their first vows, they made a pilgrimage to Liesse, walking all through the night, and again pronounced the vows before at the statue of Our Lady of Joy above the main altar). The church is now a minor basilica. Benedict Labre made a pilgrimage to Liesse in 1770.

Prior to the Revolution, pilgrimages supported the economy of the village. There were a number of hostelries to provide accommodations for pilgrims. The manufacture and sale of religious souvenirs was a dominant activity. The shrine was destroyed during the French Revolution, and later rebuilt.

== Notre-Dame de Liesse ==
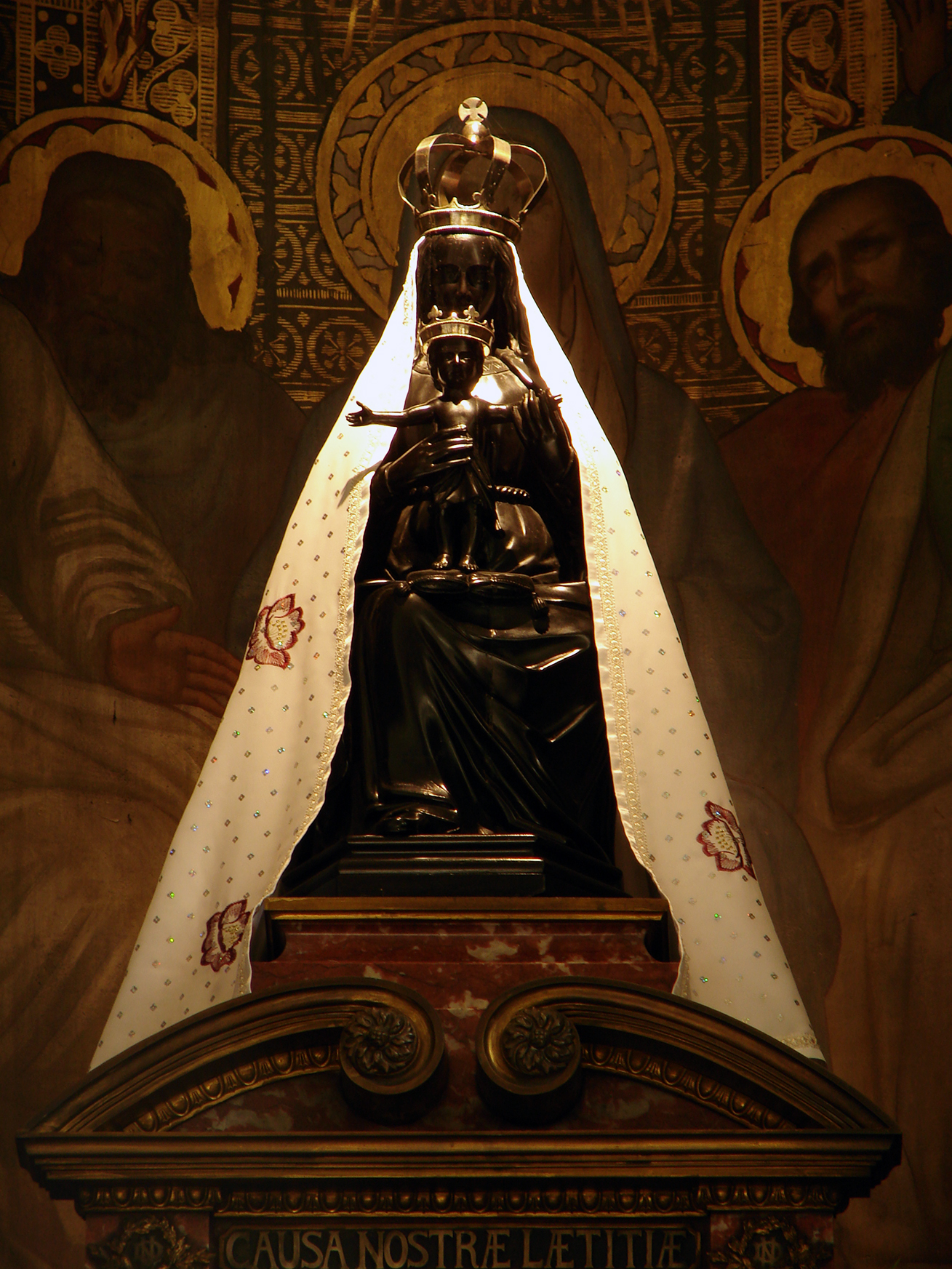
Basilique Notre-Dame de Liesse

Liesse was a favorite destination for royal pilgrimages, visited by Louis VII, Charles VI, Charles VII, and others. Devotion to Our Lady of Joy spread throughout France, particularly to Normandy where there are a number of churches dedicated to Mary under this title. An annual pilgrimage used to be held in Aude to a is in Fleury sanctuary refounded in the seventeenth century by an archbishop of Narbonne named Louis Vervins. Our Lady of Liesse is also honored in Belgium, Canada, and Malta. Jesuits spread their devotion to Africa.

Notre-Dame de Liesse is the patroness of the Diocese of Soissons.

The present site contains a pilgrim shelter that is intended primarily to accommodate pilgrims and gatherings of parishes in the diocese of Soissons, but it is open also to families and associations.

=== Legends ===
The statue is said to have been brought to Liesse by three Knights Hospitaller. The three were brothers and members of the noble house of Eppes in Picardya. Sometime in the twelfth century, while protecting the fortress of Bersabee, near Ascalon, they were captured in a Saracene ambush and taken to the Sultan of Egypt. The knights refused to convert to Islam, despite theological arguments and promises of gold and honor. Angels brought the three imprisoned knights a small statue of Our Lady for consolation. The Sultan decided to send his daughter Ismeria to the dungeon to convert the three knights. But the knights preferred to talk about what unites people of different religions. She learns about the Christian god and is prompted to assist in the brothers' escape. During their flight all four fall asleep, and during their sleep are miraculously transported to Northern France. Awakening close to the Eppes’ castle in Picardy, their joy and that of their family is immense. Ismeria receives baptism in the cathedral of Laon. The knights preserved the statue of the Madonna, and built a handsome church to receive Our Lady of Liesse. According to a sixteenth century tradition, the knights were the sons of William, sire of Eppes. Their names were Jean, Hector, and Henri.

A second story recounts how in 1139 a thief had recourse to Notre-Dame de Liesse and she saved him from hanging.

== Grand Marais ==
The Grand Marais consists of about twenty hectares of marshland with mainly bog ponds, wet wood and reed beds.In the eighteenth century, the march was mainly used for grazing and for cutting peat for heating. The Great Swamp is home to over 232 species of plants, birds and dragonflies native to Picardy. The local municipal council works with the Conservatory of Natural Sites of Picardie to preserve the site.

== Population ==
Historical population
Year	Pop.	±% p.a.
1968	1,396	—
1975	1,326	−0.73%
1982	1,464	+1.42%
1990	1,395	−0.60%
1999	1,327	−0.55%
2007	1,194	−1.31%
2012	1,319	+2.01%
2017	1,298	−0.32%
2023	1,264	−0.44%
Source: INSEE

== See also ==
- Communes of the Aisne department
