= Alanus de Rupe =

Catholic Priest, Theologian, and Mystic

Blessed Alan de la Roche OP
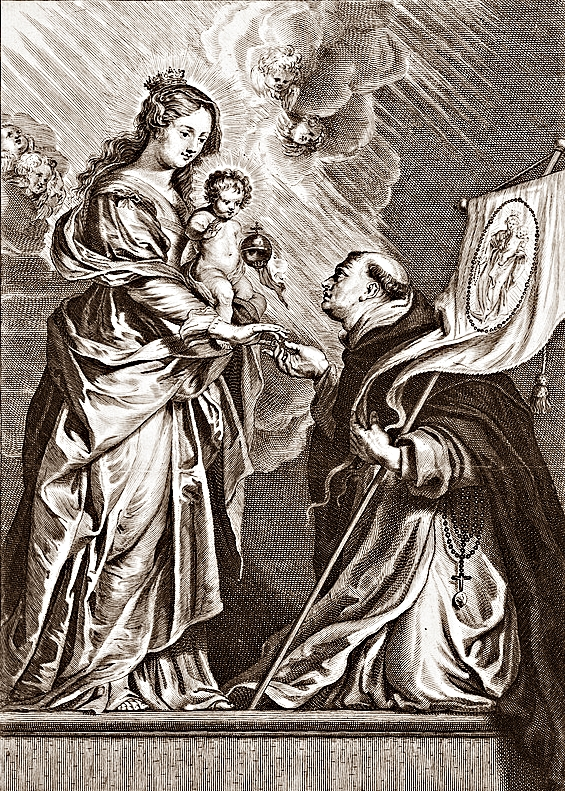
- Print depicting the mystical marriage of Alan to the Blessed Virgin Mary.

Apostle of the Rosary
- Born: 1428; Dinan, Brittany
- Died: 8 September 1475 (aged 46–47); Zwolle, Netherlands
- Venerated in: Catholic Church
- Feast: 8 September (Traditional Dominican calendar)
- Attributes: The Rosary, Banner of the Confraternity of the Holy Rosary

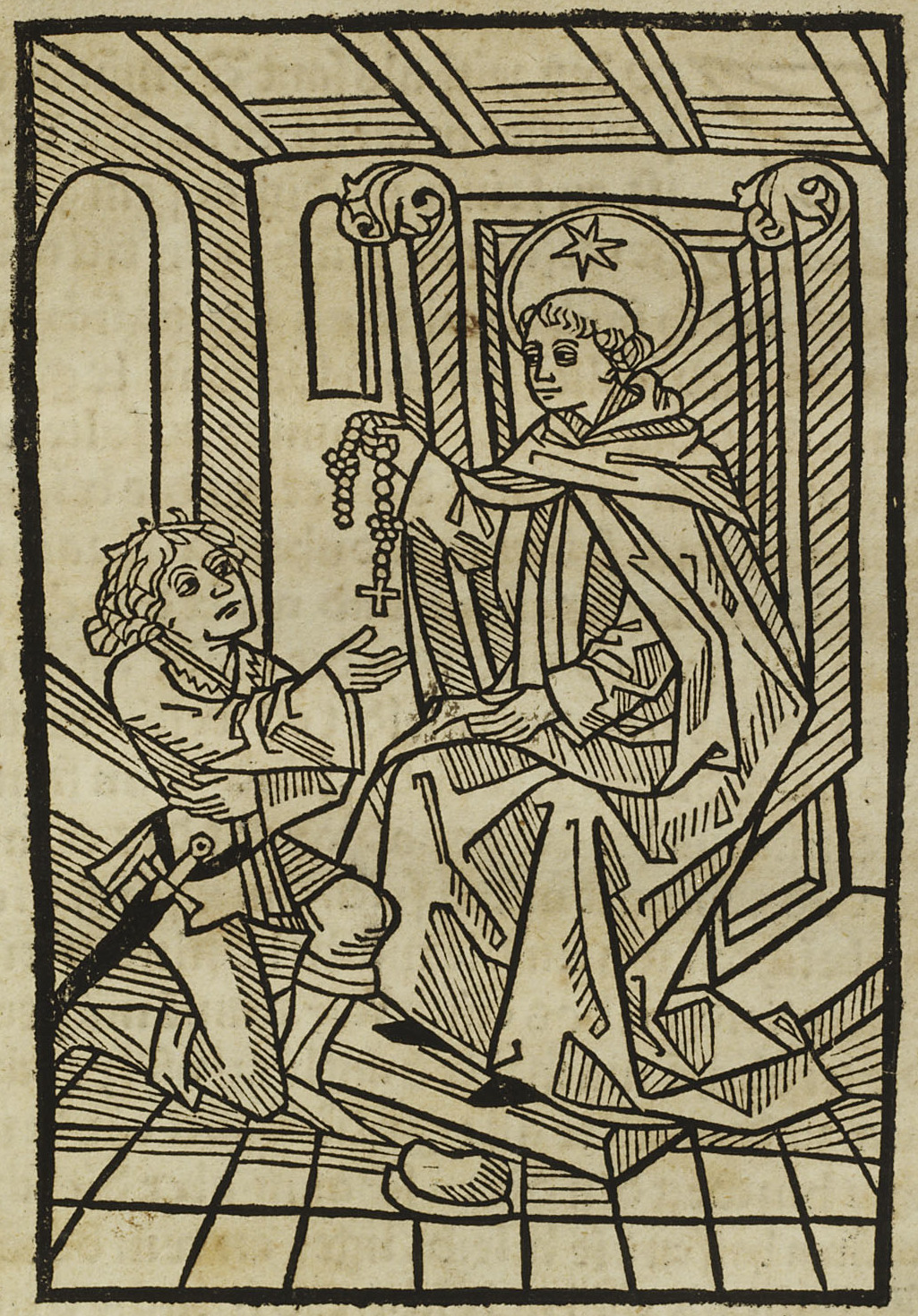
Woodblock in the Alanus Psalter, 1492

Alan de la Roche OP (Ecclesiastical Latin: Alanus de Rupe; French: Alain c. 1428 – 8 September 1475), commonly referred to simply as Blessed Alan, was a Breton Dominican friar and priest, theologian, and mystic. He is known for restoring the devotion of the Rosary, which, according to tradition, had been forgotten in most of Europe in the centuries after the death of Saint Dominic in 1221.

== Life ==
Born in Dinan, Brittany in around 1428, he entered the Dominican Order in 1459 at age thirty-one. While pursuing his studies at Saint Jacques, Paris, he distinguished himself in philosophy and theology. From 1459 to 1475 he taught almost uninterruptedly at Paris, Lille, Douay, Ghent, and Rostock in Germany, where, in 1473, he was made Master of Sacred Theology. During his sixteen years of teaching he became a most renowned preacher. He was indefatigable in what he regarded as his special mission, the preaching and re-establishment of the Rosary, which he did with success throughout northern France, Flanders, and the Netherlands. He established a Confraternity of the Psalter of the Glorious Virgin Mary, around 1470 which was instrumental in disseminating the rosary throughout Europe. Some writers claim him as a native of Germany, others of Belgium; but his disciple, Cornelius Sneek, says that he was born in Brittany. He died at Zwolle.

Alan published nothing during his lifetime, but immediately after his death the brethren of his province were commanded to collect his writings for publication. These were edited at different times and have occasioned some controversy among scholars. A list of writings attributed to Alan was compiled by J. G. T. Graesse in Trésor des livres rares et précieux (1859).

== Alan's Works ==
=== Works ===
At the time of Alan's death, nothing by him had been committed to print. In the year following his death, the Provincial Chapter of the Congregation of Dominicans of Holland, ordered that all priors make a diligent inquiry concerning Alan's books, treatises, or compilations. They also ordered that whatever was found, either in originals, transcripts, or copies, should be transmitted as quickly as possible to the Vicar General. This order, however, was repealed two years later at the following Chapter in 1478. What works were attributed to him were written on paper and multiplied in small numbers; And none of Alan's original manuscripts survive today. The first known collection of his works was printed in a Carthusian Monastery of Sweden in 1498 under the name Sponsus Novellus. Of this text the English Jesuit Father Herbert Thurston remarks that "the form of the Sponsus Novellus shows that it was not left for publication as it stands by Alan himself. It is obviously a collection, made by somebody else, of his miscellaneous papers, revelations, sermons, anecdotes, &c. Much of the supplementary matter inserted at the close of the volume is suggestive of a Carthusian origin, and this, seeing that the book was printed in a Carthusian monastery, is not at all unlikely." He also states that he believes that much of what we possess is originally from notes taken at Alan's spoken discourses. Noting these difficulties, at the beginning of the 17th century the Dominican Father Johann Coppenstein published his own version of Alan's writings, which he divided into five parts, under the title Beatus Alanus de Rupe, redivivus. He states in the preface to the work, that although the matter is Alan's, the form is his. Coppenstein adds that he attempted to remove what was scattered and added to the work by a posthumous collector.

The works of Alan were published by Coppenstein in the following order,

- Apology to Ferricus, Bishop of Tournai.
- Relations, Revelations, and Visions Regarding the Rosary.
- The sermons of St. Dominic Revealed to Alan.
- Sermons and Short Treatises of Alan.
- Examples or Miracles of the Rosary.

Besides these, other works attribute to Alan include an exposition of the Rule of St. Augustine and a work on the Confraternity of the Psalter of Our Lady.

=== Authenticity ===
On these grounds the authenticity of the works attributed to Alan has been debated. The Dominican Father Antonin Danzas complains that we have been given a pseudo-Alan. In one text attributed to Alan; relating one-hundred and fifty articles the Blessed Virgin was supposed to have given him for meditation; a posthumous editor states that some of the articles were not to his taste, some appearing too long or too short, and therefore he changed and suppressed what did not appear authentic to him. And that he also added himself several things from the writings of the holy doctors. The Dominican Father Denys Mézard states that it is known with certainty that Alan's writings have been altered, falsified and interpolated; that the texts published under his name are at contradiction with one another. He goes on further to say that the works of Alan have come down to us under a triple-filter: That of the listeners, that of the posthumous editor, and that of Fr. Coppenstein. He makes an exception for Alan's Apology to the Bishop of Tournai, which, because there existed at least another copy held by the Bishop, would not have been as easy to modify.

== Alan on Dominic and the Rosary ==
According to an old Dominican tradition, in the early 13th century, Dominic de Guzmán was distressed at his lack of success in his preaching against the Albigensians and prayed to the Virgin Mary for help. She reportedly appeared to him and told him to use her psalter in conjunction with his preaching. This psalter, a custom of praying 150 Hail Marys rather than Psalms, developed into the Rosary.

This traditional origin for the Rosary was generally accepted, including by many popes and figures such as Louis De Montfort, until the 17th century, when Bollandists concluded that the account originated with Alan, writing over two hundred years after Dominic's life. Alan attributed his descriptions of Dominic to a 1460 vision; later authors have suggested that he may have invented them to enliven sermons. John T. McNicholas, a Catholic bishop, held that Alan's accounts should not be regarded as historical. Herbert Thurston, while describing Alan as pious and earnest, argued that he was full of delusions and that his revelations were based on the imaginary testimony of nonexistent writers. Although historical evidence for Dominic's role in the origin of the Rosary is lacking and has been questioned by scholars such as the Bollandists, several popes after the 17th century, including Pope Leo XIII and Pope Pius XI, continued to attribute its origin to Dominic in official documents such as encyclicals.

== Fifteen Rosary promises ==
According to Alan, Mary made fifteen specific promises through Dominic de Guzmán to those who faithfully pray the Rosary. The fifteen Rosary promises range from protection from misfortune to meriting a high degree of glory in heaven.
