= Cornelius Sneek =

Cornelius Sneek (1455–1534) was a 15th–16th century Dominican priest and a member of the Congregation of Holland.

He was a student of Alanus de Rupe and wrote one of the early works on the rosary. Sneek taught the Summa Theologica at Rostock.

== Literature ==
- Karl Ernst Hermann Krause (1892). "Snêken, Cornelius van" . Allgemeine Deutsche Biographie (in German). Vol. 34. Leipzig: Duncker & Humblot. pp. 500–502.
- Gerhard Schlegel: Sneek, Cornelius Henrici von, in: Sabine Pettke (Hg.): Biographisches Lexikon für Mecklenburg. Vol. 2, Rostock: Schmidt-Römhild 1999 (publication of the Historic Commission for Mecklenburg) ISBN 3-7950-3711-5, pp. 238–242
- Grewolls, Grete (2011). Wer war wer in Mecklenburg und Vorpommern. Das Personenlexikon (in German). Rostock: Hinstorff Verlag. p. 9485. ISBN 978-3-356-01301-6.
