= The Power of the Rosary =

Book on rosary prayer by Albert Shamon

- Author: Reverend Albert J. M. Shamon
- Publication date: 1 July 1997
- Pages: 43
- ISBN: 9781891280108

The Power of the Rosary is a book on Catholic themes by Reverend Albert J. M. Shamon.

The book revolves around the topic of Catholic beliefs on the power of prayer via the rosary. It builds on the fifteen rosary promises and extends the discussion to the present day. It discusses that the rosary has been featured prominently in the context of several Marian apparitions such as those in Međugorje and Our Lady of Fatima. It also recounts many anecdotal incidents regarding the rosary, ranging from religious and political prisoners in China to every day Catholics.

== See also ==
- Secret of the Rosary
- Rosary devotions and spirituality
- Catholic beliefs on the power of prayer
