= Fifteen Rosary promises =

Roman Catholic prayer

The Fifteen Promises is a tradition held by the Order of Preachers (also known as Dominicans) that the Blessed Virgin Mary made fifteen specific promises through Dominic de Guzmán and Alan de Rupe, to those who faithfully pray the Rosary. The fifteen stated promises range from protection from misfortune to meriting a high degree of glory in heaven.

== History ==
According to the Dominican tradition, Alanus de Rupe recorded 15 promises that the Virgin Mary had allegedly given to Dominic de Guzmán through private revelation for those who devoutly pray the Rosary.

Similar to the tradition of Dominic's role in the origin of the Rosary, the earliest documentation about the Fifteen Promises appears in the 15th century, when they were popularized by Alanus de Rupe. The Fifteen Promises are considered private revelation, and Catholics are free to accept or reject them.

== Fifteen Rosary Promises ==
1. Those who faithfully serve me by the recitation of the Rosary shall receive signal graces.
2. I promise my special protection and the greatest graces to all those who shall recite the Rosary.
3. The Rosary shall be a powerful armor against hell. It will destroy vice, decrease sin, and defeat heresies.
4. The recitation of the Rosary will cause virtue and good works to flourish. It will obtain for souls the abundant mercy of God. It will withdraw the hearts of men from the love of the world and its vanities, and will lift them to the desire of eternal things. Oh, that souls would sanctify themselves by this means.
5. The soul which recommends itself to me by the recitation of the Rosary shall not perish.
6. Those who recite my Rosary devoutly, applying themselves to the consideration of its sacred mysteries, shall never be conquered by misfortune. In his justice, God will not chastise them; nor shall they perish by an unprovided death, i.e., be unprepared for heaven. Sinners shall convert. The just shall persevere in grace and become worthy of eternal life.
7. Those who have a true devotion to the Rosary shall not die without the sacraments of the Church.
8. Those who faithfully recite the Rosary shall have, during their life and at their death, the light of God and the plenitude of his graces. At the moment of death, they shall participate in the merits of the saints in paradise.
9. I shall deliver from purgatory those who have been devoted to the Rosary.
10. The faithful children of the Rosary shall merit a high degree of glory in heaven.
11. By the recitation of the Rosary you shall obtain all that you ask of me.
12. Those who propagate the holy Rosary shall be aided by me in their necessities.
13. I have obtained from my Divine Son that all the advocates of the Rosary shall have for intercessors the entire celestial court during their life and at the hour of their death.
14. All who recite the Rosary are my beloved children and the brothers and sisters of my only Son, Jesus Christ.
15. Devotion for my Rosary is a great sign of predestination.

== See also ==
- Prayer in the Catholic Church
- Alanus de Rupe
- Dominic de Guzmán
- Order of Preachers
