= Henri Boudon =

French abbot

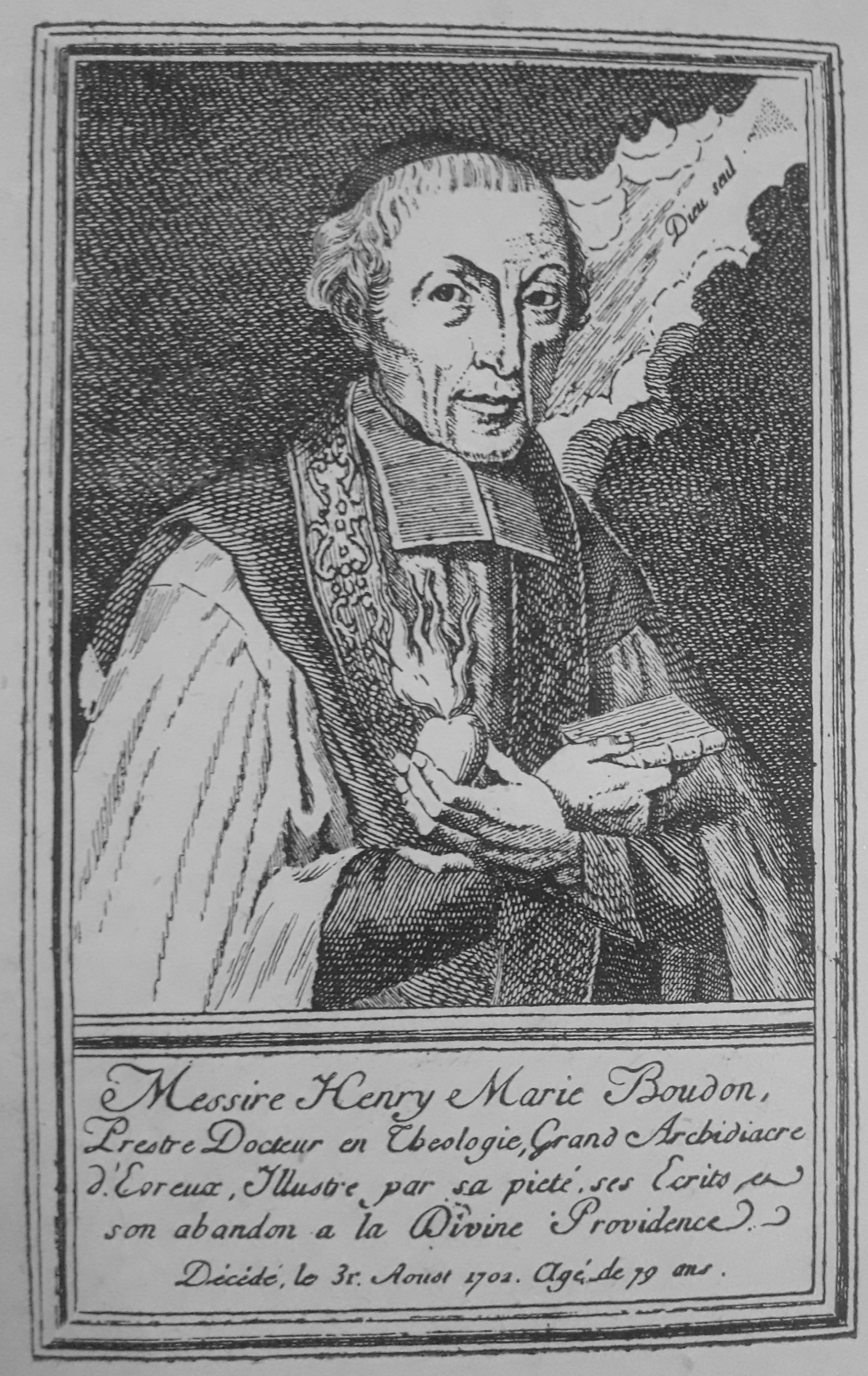

Henri-Marie Boudon (14 January 1624 – 31 August 1702) was a 17th-century Roman Catholic French abbot and spiritual author.

== Life ==
Boudon was born in La Fère in Picardy to Jean and Antoinette Jourdin Boudon. His father was lieutenant of the citadel. After 15 years of childless marriage his mother prayed for a child, which prayers became only more intense with the death of their first born shortly after birth. The town of Liesse-Notre-Dame is situated about 28 miles (45 km) northwest of Reims. Liesse-Notre-Dame (Our Lady of Joy) is a center of Marian pilgrimage, and was a favorite shrine of Princess Henrietta Maria of France. On her way to Liesse, in company with her mother, Marie de' Medici, and sister-in-law, Anne of Austria, she happened to pass through La Fère on the day of the infant Boudon's christening. The princess agreed to be the child's godmother and he was baptised Henri-Marie.

Not long after his christening, his parents made a pilgrimage to Liesse, where his mother dedicated the child to Mary, Queen of Angels and invoked her protection of him. His father died shortly thereafter, and his mother soon remarried. At the age of eleven Henri-Marie was sent to attend the Jesuit college at Rouen. Later he studied at the Sorbonne.

He was ordained in January, 1655. Boudon served as Archdeacon of Evreux and given with the authority of Vicar-General. During his visitations to various ecclesiastical sites, the Archdeacon was particularly dismayed at the deplorable conditions he found in many domestic chapels of the chateaux of the privileged. His criticism was not well-received and made many enemies, as did his efforts to reform a disinterested and self-indulgent clergy.

Boudon was a key figure in the French school of spirituality. A recurring theme in Boudon's work, characteristic of the French school, was the idea that the search for God requires detachment from all creatures. "God Alone" was his motto. His book Dieu seul: Le Saint esclavage de l'admirable Mère de Dieu, (Only God, the Holy Slavery of the Admirable Mother of God) was praised warmly by Jacques-Bénigne Bossuet, and was a key influence on Saint Louis de Montfort.

== Works ==
- Dieu Inconnu
- Dieu seul: Le Saint esclavage de l'admirable Mère de Dieu, (Only God, the Holy Slavery of the Admirable Mother of God)
- Règne de Dieu dans l'Oraison Mentale
- Devotion to the Nine Choirs of Angels
- Les Saintes Voies de la Croix, (The Holy Ways of the Cross)

== Bibliography ==
- Henri-Marie Boudon, Dieu seul: Le Saint esclavage de l'admirable Mère de Dieu, Paris 1674.
- Henri-Marie Boudon, The Holy Ways of the Cross St Athanasius Press, 2010 ISBN 0-9769118-7-6.
- Henri-Marie Boudon, Devotion to the Nine Choirs of Angels TAN Books, 2026 ISBN 9781505135305.
