= Signum Magnum =

Signum Magnum (Latin for a great sign) is an apostolic exhortation on consecration to the Blessed Virgin Mary by Pope Paul VI. It was released on May 13, 1967 in Saint Peter's Basilica in Rome, on the 50th anniversary of Our Lady of Fátima, to coincide with the Pope's visit to the Sanctuary of Fátima, in Cova da Iria, Portugal.

== Content ==
The title refers to Revelation 12:1 "A great sign appeared in the sky, a woman clothed with the sun, with the moon under her feet, and on her head a crown of twelve stars."

Signum Magnum begins by asserting that honor is accorded to Mary throughout history, and states, "Mary's spiritual motherhood transcends the boundaries of time and space. It is part of the Church's history for all times, because she never ceases to exercise her maternal office or to help us."

Signum Magnum repeatedly quotes Lumen gentium and extends the teaching on Virgin Mary, Mother of the Church. Addressed to the Catholic bishops of the world, Paul exhorts "all the sons of the Church to renew personally their consecration to the Immaculate Heart of the Mother of the Church".

== Chant ==
Signum Magnum is also the title of the Gregorian Chant for the Introit of the Feast of the Assumption of Virgin Mary, on August 15. It is similar to Puer Natus, the chant used for the Introit for Christmas Day. Joyous, while observing the solemnity of the feast, Signum Magnum is drawn from the opening of Revelation 12 in Sacred Scripture (Revelation 12:1).

== Sources ==
- Pope Paul IV (May 13, 1967). "Signum magnum". Libreria Editrice Vaticana.
