= Totus tuus =

"All yours", Latin motto used by Pope John Paul II

Totus tuus is a Latin greeting which was routinely used to sign off letters written in Latin, meaning "all yours", often abbreviated as "t.t." (a variation was ex asse tuus). In recent history Totus tuus was used by Pope John Paul II as his personal motto to express his personal Consecration to Mary based on the spiritual approach of Louis de Montfort and the Mariology in his works. The pontiff explained the meaning further in his 1994 book Crossing the Threshold of Hope where he defines it as not only an expression of piety but also of devotion that is deeply rooted in the Mystery of the Blessed Trinity.

== Description ==
Coat of arms of Karol Józef Wojtyła as a cardinal. It bears the motto.

According to his Apostolic Letter Rosarium Virginis Mariae he borrowed the motto from the Marian consecrating prayer found in the 1712 book True Devotion to Mary by Louis de Montfort. The complete text of the prayer in Latin is:

Totus tuus ego sum, et omnia mea tua sunt. Accipio te in mea omnia. Praebe mihi cor tuum, Maria. ("I belong entirely to you, and all that I have is yours. I take you for my all. O Mary, give me your heart")

Pope John Paul II once recalled how as a young seminarian he "read and reread many times and with great spiritual profit" some writings of Louis de Montfort and that:

"Then I understood that I could not exclude the Lord's Mother from my life without neglecting the will of God-Trinity."

== Indulgence ==
The 2004 Enchiridion Indulgentiarum (Indulgences Handbook) grants the indulgence for the prayer of Saint Louis-Marie Grignion de Montfort.

== Musical settings ==
Dana's song "Totus Tuus", commemorating John Paul II's 1979 visit to Ireland, topped the Irish Singles Chart the following year; she sang it at papal masses in 1987 and at World Youth Day 1993.

In 1987, Henryk Górecki composed a choral piece (Totus Tuus Op. 60) to celebrate the Pope's third pilgrimage to his native Poland that summer. While the motet opens with the same words as the apostolic motto, the piece actually uses a poem by Maria Boguslawska for its text.

== See also ==
- Consecration and entrustment to Mary
- Roman Catholic Mariology
- Totus Tuus (Górecki)
