= Redemptoris Mater =

1987 papal encyclical by Pope John Paul II

Redemptoris Mater Latin for 'Mother of the Redeemer' Encyclical of Pope John Paul II
- Signature date: 25 March 1987
- Subject: The Blessed Virgin Mary in the Life of the Pilgrim Church
- Pages: 95
- Number: 6 of 14 of the pontificate
- Text: In Latin; In English

Redemptoris Mater (Latin: Mother of the Redeemer) is an encyclical by Pope John Paul II delivered on March 25, 1987 in Saint Peter's Basilica in Rome. Subtitled On the Blessed Virgin Mary in the life of the Pilgrim Church, the text addresses a number of topics in Mariology.

== Background ==
Redemptoris Mater, which the Pope called his "reflection on the role of Mary in the mystery of Christ and on her active and exemplary presence in the life of the Church" was promulgated by John Paul II in connection with the Marian year declared for 1987/88.

== Contents ==
The encyclical starts by discussing the special place of the Blessed Virgin Mary in the plan of salvation and continues to focus on Mary's role in the Mystery of Christ in Part I of the encyclical.

Part II discusses Mary's role as the Mother of God at the centre of the Pilgrim Church. "The Mother of that Son, therefore, mindful of what has been told her at the Annunciation and in subsequent events, bears within herself the radical "newness" of faith: the beginning of the New Covenant." This is built on later in Part III where Pope John Paul II confirmed the title, Mother of the Church, proclaimed by Pope Paul VI at the Second Vatican Council on November 21, 1964. This encyclical states:

Mary embraces each and every one in the Church, and embraces each and every one through the Church. In this sense Mary, Mother of the Church, is also the Church's model.

Part III also deals with Maternal Mediation and the role of the Virgin Mary as a Mediatrix. The pontiff said:

Thus there is a mediation: Mary places herself between her Son and mankind in the reality of their wants, needs and sufferings. She puts herself "in the middle," that is to say she acts as a mediatrix not as an outsider, but in her position as mother. She knows that as such she can point out to her Son the needs of mankind, and in fact, she "has the right" to do so. Her mediation is thus in the nature of intercession: Mary "intercedes" for mankind.

The Pope notes the special honor in which Mary is held by the Orthodox Church and the ancient Churches of the East, and mentions the extensive artistic tradition which depicts her as the god-bearing Theotokos; the Hodegetria, "she who shows the way"; and the Eleusa, or Virgin of Tenderness.

== Influences ==
This encyclical reflects the influence of Saint Louis de Montfort's Marian teachings on Pope John Paul II. The pontiff singled out Saint Louis (who also inspired the pontiff's motto Totus Tuus) in this encyclical, saying that:

I would like to recall, among the many witnesses and teachers of this spirituality, the figure of Saint Louis Marie Grignion de Montfort who proposes consecration to Christ through the hands of Mary, as an effective means for Christians to live faithfully their baptismal commitments.

The seeds of this encyclical may be traced to the statement by Pope John Paul II that as a young seminarian he "read and reread many times and with great spiritual profit" a work of Saint Louis de Montfort and that:

"Then I understood that I could not exclude the Lord's Mother from my life without neglecting the will of God-Trinity"

In the conclusion to the encyclical the pontiff stated: "The Church sees the Blessed Mother of God in the saving mystery of Christ and in her own mystery".

== See also ==
- Marialis Cultus
- Catholic Mariology
- Mariological papal documents
- Redemptoris custos
- Lumen gentium
