= The Secret of the Rosary =

Book by Louis de Montfort

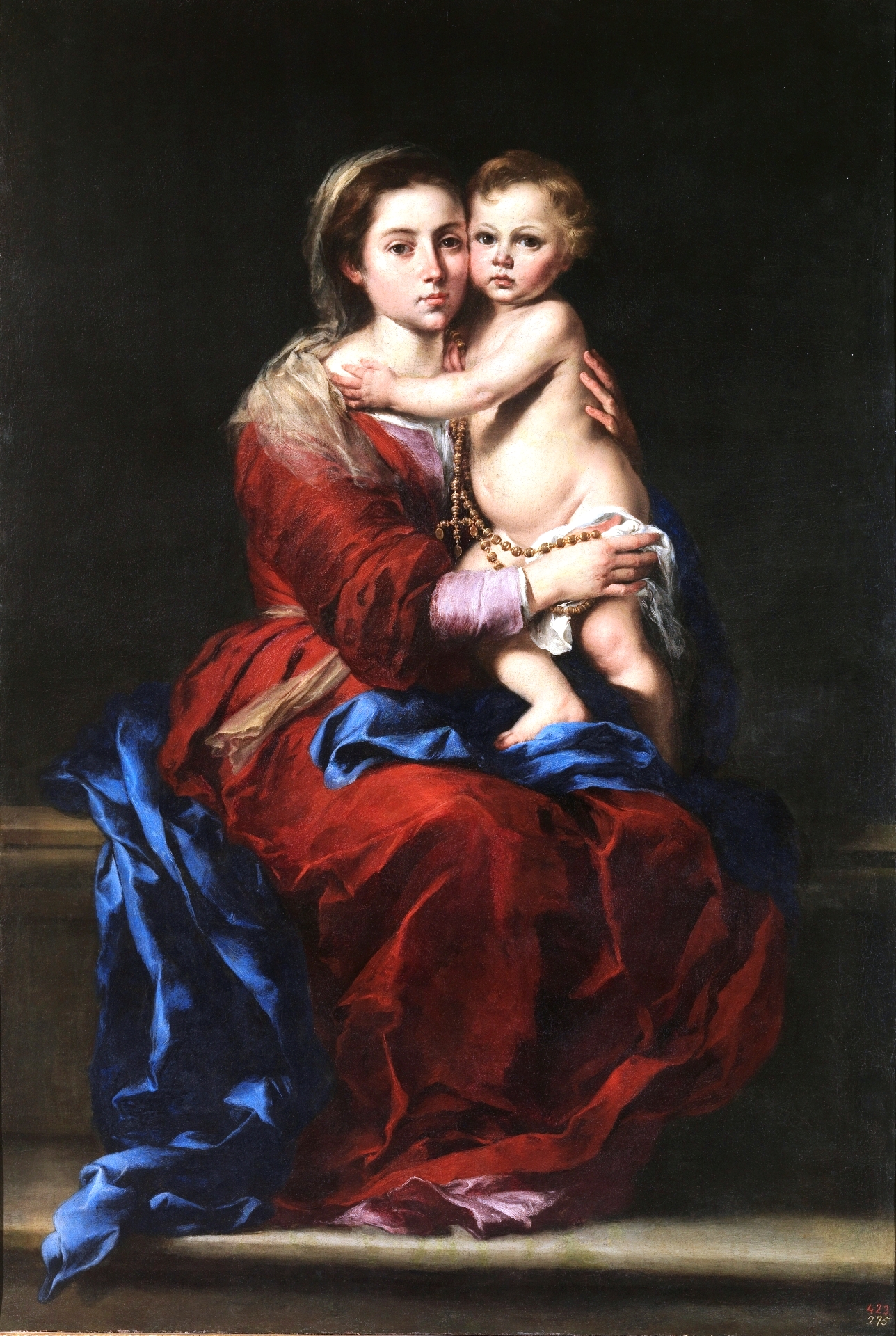
Madonna with the Rosary by Murillo, 1650.

The Secret of the Rosary (le Secret admirable du très saint Rosaire pour se convertir et se sauver) is a book about the Holy Rosary written by Louis de Montfort, a French priest and Catholic saint who died in 1716. The English translation of the book bears the Imprimatur of Archbishop Thomas E. Molloy of the Roman Catholic Diocese of Brooklyn. It is said to be the earliest extant book describing the modern way in which the Rosary is prayed.

Secret of the Rosary has been felt by some to be the greatest book ever written on the Rosary. Pope John Paul II called de Montfort’s book an excellent work on the rosary in Rosarium Virginis Mariae, paragraph 8.

The book revolves around the views of the rosary and the power of the rosary and consists of a number of short sections called Roses each being about one or two pages long. Each Rose discusses a separate viewpoint about the Rosary and may be addressed to a different cross section of the audience, e.g. priests versus lay people.

This book discusses two different methods of praying the rosary, while three additional methods (i.e. five altogether) are listed in the book God Alone, based on the collected writings of St. Louis.

The book consists of an introduction, plus two main parts. Part I: “What the Rosary is” and Part II: “How to Recite it”. The book is structured in terms of 53 Roses, i.e. sections. The introduction consists of three Roses, Part I embodies the First Rose to the Fortieth Rose and Part II includes the Fiftieth Rose.

The introduction has three Roses: The White Rose for priests, the Red Rose for sinners, and the Mystical Rose Tree for devout souls. These three Roses epitomize the multi-view approach taken by the book. The advice to priests about using the Rosary to save sinners directly relates to the advice given to sinners on how to use the Rosary for salvation. This theme continues throughout the book, each Rose gently leading to another, in the process gradually revealing various “secrets” on how to approach the Rosary, how to recite and how to use it for optimal spiritual benefits.

An example of the multi-perspective, yet pragmatic, method with which the book deals with the Rosary is the way the concepts of focus and respect are conveyed through a set of Roses. This starts with the Forty First Rose called “Purity of Intention”. This Rose points out that it is not the length of a prayer that matters, but the fervor, purity and respect with which it is said, e.g. a single properly said Hail Mary is worth many that are badly said. This Rose is followed by the two Roses “Attention” and “Fighting Distractions”. These provide advice for achieving the proper mindset for saying the Rosary. The topic then concludes with the Rose “With Reverence” which returns to respect. Although each of these is a separate Rose, they are cleverly inter-related to present multiple dimensions for focus and respect.

Hence, although the book is highly readable and unassuming on the surface, it is based on a well structured “multi-perspective analysis” of the Rosary. The fifty three sections are intricately connected and clearly thought out. Hence the term “secret” is quite becoming, for the book reveals these interconnections in terms of a coherent theme. But the typical reader need not be concerned with the analyses because the flow of the text is natural, pure and pious and appeals to laymen as well as priests. The book has been read by Catholics worldwide for over two centuries and continues to be a great spiritual resource.

== See also ==
- Methods of Praying the Rosary
- Mariology
- Our Lady's Rosary Makers
- Power of Catholic prayer
- The Power of the Rosary
