= Louis de Montfort =

French Catholic priest and saint (1673–1716)

Saint Louis-Marie Grignion de Montfort SMM
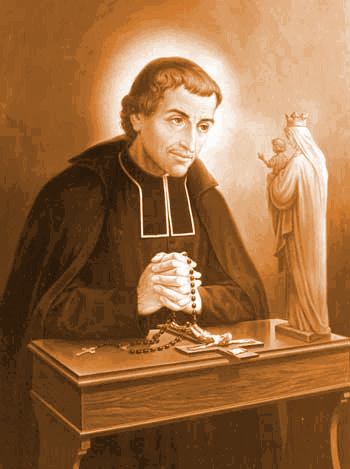

Confessor
- Born: 31 January 1673; Montfort-sur-Meu, France
- Died: 28 April 1716 (aged 43); Saint-Laurent-sur-Sèvre
- Venerated in: Catholic Church
- Beatified: 1888 by Pope Leo XIII
- Canonized: 20 July 1947 by Pope Pius XII
- Feast: 28 April
- Patronage: Preachers; those devoted to the Virgin Mary and the rosary

Louis-Marie Grignion de Montfort, SMM (French pronunciation: [lwi maʁi ɡʁiɲɔ̃ də mɔ̃fɔʁ]; 31 January 1673 – 28 April 1716) was a French Catholic priest known for his influence on Catholic Mariology. He wrote a number of books that went on to become classic Catholic titles, including Secret of the Rosary and True Devotion to Mary, and influenced several popes. He also founded several religious communities, including the Company of Mary.

Pope Pius XII canonised him on 20 July 1947. A "founder's statue" created by Giacomo Parisini is located in an upper niche of the south nave of St. Peter's Basilica.

== Early years ==
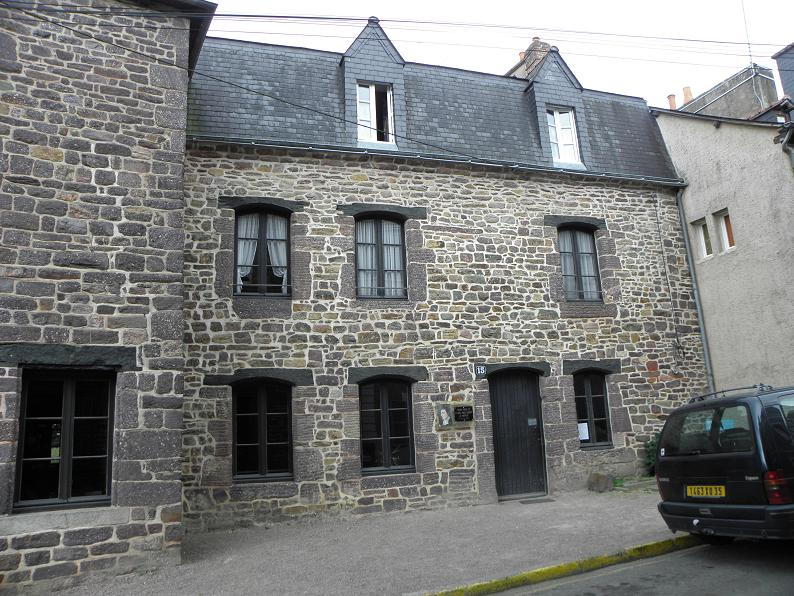
Montfort's birthplace in Montfort-sur-Meu

Montfort was born in 1673 in Montfort-sur-Meu, the eldest surviving child of eighteen born to Jean-Baptiste and Jeanne Robert Grignion. His father was a notary. Louis-Marie passed most of his infancy and early childhood in Iffendic, a few kilometers from Montfort, where his father had bought a farm. At the age of 12, he entered the Jesuit College of St. Thomas Becket in Rennes, where his uncle was a parish priest. At the end of his ordinary schooling, he began his studies of philosophy and theology, still at St. Thomas in Rennes.

Listening to the stories of a local priest, the Abbé Julien Bellier, about his life as an itinerant missionary, Montfort was inspired to preach missions among the very poor. Bellier was propagating among his students a consecration and entrustment to Mary. Under the guidance of Bellier and other priests, de Montfort began to develop his strong devotion to the Blessed Virgin Mary.

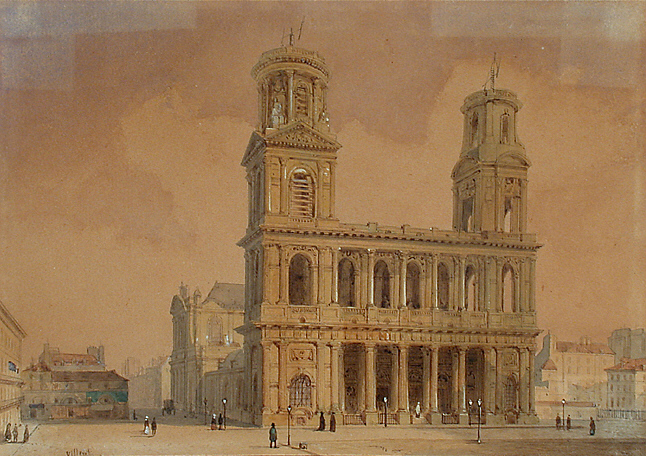
19th century depiction of St Sulpice where Montfort had earlier studied for the priesthood

Through a benefactor, opportunity arose to go to Paris to study at the renowned Seminary of Saint-Sulpice towards the end of 1693. When Montfort arrived in Paris, it was to find that his benefactor had not provided enough money for him, so he lodged in a succession of boarding houses, living among the very poor, in the meantime attending the Sorbonne University for lectures in theology. After less than two years, he became very ill and had to be admitted to hospital. He survived this, despite the blood letting that was common practice at that time.

Leaving hospital, he was surprised to find his place had been kept open for him at the Little Saint-Sulpice, which he entered in July 1695. This seminary had been founded by Jean-Jacques Olier, one of the leading experts of what came to be known as the French school of spirituality. He was appointed the seminary's librarian, which gave him the opportunity to study most of the available works on spirituality and, in particular, on the Virgin Mary's place in the Christian life. This later led to his focus on the Holy rosary and Montfort's acclaimed book, The Secret of the Rosary.

=== Devotion to the angels ===
Even as a seminarian in Paris, Montfort was known for his veneration of angels: he "urged his confreres to show marks of respect and tenderness to their guardian angels" and often ended his letters with a salutation to the guardian angel of the person to whom he was writing. When, later, he arrived in Nantes, he saluted all the angels of the city. Apparently, this was something he repeated whenever he entered a village or town.

One reason behind Montfort's showing such devotion to angels is that veneration of the pure spirits was an integral part of his training, and also of his culture. His college teachers, all Jesuits, were known for their zeal in propagating devotion to the angels. Montfort's seminary training under the Sulpicians brought him into contact with the thought of Cardinal de Bérulle and Olier, both of whom had deep veneration for the angels. During the seventeenth and eighteenth centuries, manuals of piety and treatises on the pure spirits abounded.

== From priest to preacher ==
Louis was ordained a priest in June 1700, and assigned to Nantes. His great desire had been the foreign missions, preferably in the new French colony of Canada, but his spiritual director advised against it. Letters of this period show he felt frustrated by the lack of opportunity to preach as he felt he was called to.

In November 1710 he joined the Third Order of Saint Dominic and asked permission not only to preach the rosary, but also to form rosary confraternities. He began to consider forming a small company of priests to preach missions and retreats under the standard and protection of the Blessed Virgin. This was to eventually lead to the founding of the Company of Mary.

Around this time, Louis de Montfort was appointed chaplain of the hospital in Nantes. This was when he was first introduced to Marie Louise Trichet, a meeting that launched her 34 years' service to the poor. During Louis de Montfort's time, France was beginning to face a mounting economic crisis: a rapidly growing population was outpacing the food supply.

Desiring to be a missionary, Montfort made a pilgrimage to Rome to ask the advice of Pope Clement XI. The Pope recognized his real vocation and, telling him there was plenty of opportunity for its exercise in France, sent him back with the title of Apostolic Missionary. On his return from his long pilgrimage to Rome, Montfort made a retreat at Mont Saint Michel "to pray to this archangel to obtain from him the grace to win souls for God, to confirm those already in God's grace, and to fight Satan and sin". These occasions gave him time to think, contemplate and write.

For several years he preached in missions from Brittany to Nantes. As his reputation as a missioner grew, he became known as "the good Father from Montfort". At Pontchateau he attracted hundreds of people to help him in the construction of a huge calvary. However, on the very eve of its blessing, the Bishop, having heard it was to be destroyed on the orders of the King of France under the influence of members of the Jansenist school, forbade its benediction. It is reported that upon receiving this news, he simply said, "Blessed be God."

== Final years ==
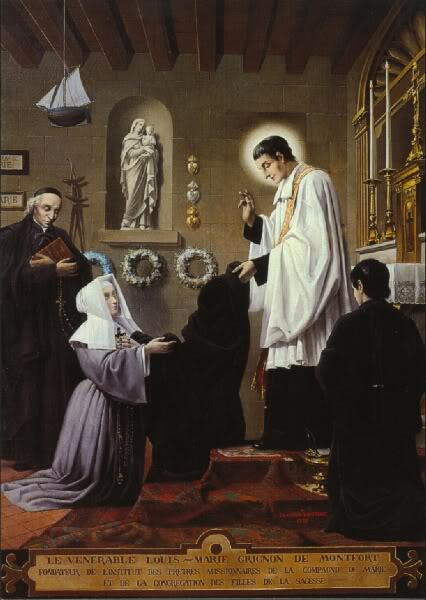
Depiction of Montfort with Marie Louise Trichet, at the foundation of the congregation of the Daughters of Wisdom, 19th century

Montfort left Nantes and the next several years were extraordinarily busy for him. He was constantly occupied in preaching missions, always walking between one and another. Yet he found time also to write his True Devotion to Mary, The Secret of Mary and the Secret of the Rosary, rules for the Company of Mary and the Daughters of Wisdom, and many hymns. His missions made a great impact, especially in the Vendée. The heated style of his preaching was regarded by some people as somewhat strange and he was poisoned once. Although it did not prove fatal, it caused his health to deteriorate. Yet he continued, undeterred. He went on preaching and established free schools for the poor boys and girls.

=== Daughters of Wisdom ===
The bishop of La Rochelle had been impressed with Montfort for some time and invited him to open a school there. Montfort enlisted the help of his follower Marie Louise Trichet, who was then running the General Hospital in Poitiers. In 1715 Marie Louise and Catherine Brunet left Poitiers for La Rochelle to open the school there and in a short time it had 400 students.

On 22 August 1715 Trichet and Brunet, along with Marie Valleau and Marie Régnier from La Rochelle, received the approbation of Bishop de Champflour of La Rochelle to make their religious vows under the direction of Montfort. At the ceremony Montfort told them: "Call yourselves the Daughters of Wisdom, for the teaching of children and the care of the poor." The Daughters of Wisdom grew into an international organization and the placing of Montfort's founders statue in Saint Peter's Basilica was based on that organization.

=== Death and burial ===
Montfort's 16 years of priesthood include many months of solitude, perhaps as many as a total of four years; at the cave of Mervent, amidst the beauty of the forest, at the hermitage of Saint Lazarus near the village of Montfort, and at the hermitage of Saint Eloi in La Rochelle.

Worn out by hard work and sickness, he finally came in April 1716 to Saint-Laurent-sur-Sèvre to begin the mission which was to be his last. During it, he fell ill and died on 28 April of that year. He was 43 years old, and had been a priest for only 16 years. His last sermon was on the tenderness of Jesus and the Incarnate Wisdom of the Father. Thousands gathered for his burial in the parish church, and very quickly there were stories of miracles performed at his tomb.

Exactly 43 years later, on 28 April 1759, Marie Louise Trichet also died in Saint-Laurent-sur-Sèvre and was buried next to Montfort. On 19 September 1996 Pope John Paul II (who beatified Trichet) came to the same site to meditate and pray at their adjacent tombs.

== Spirituality ==
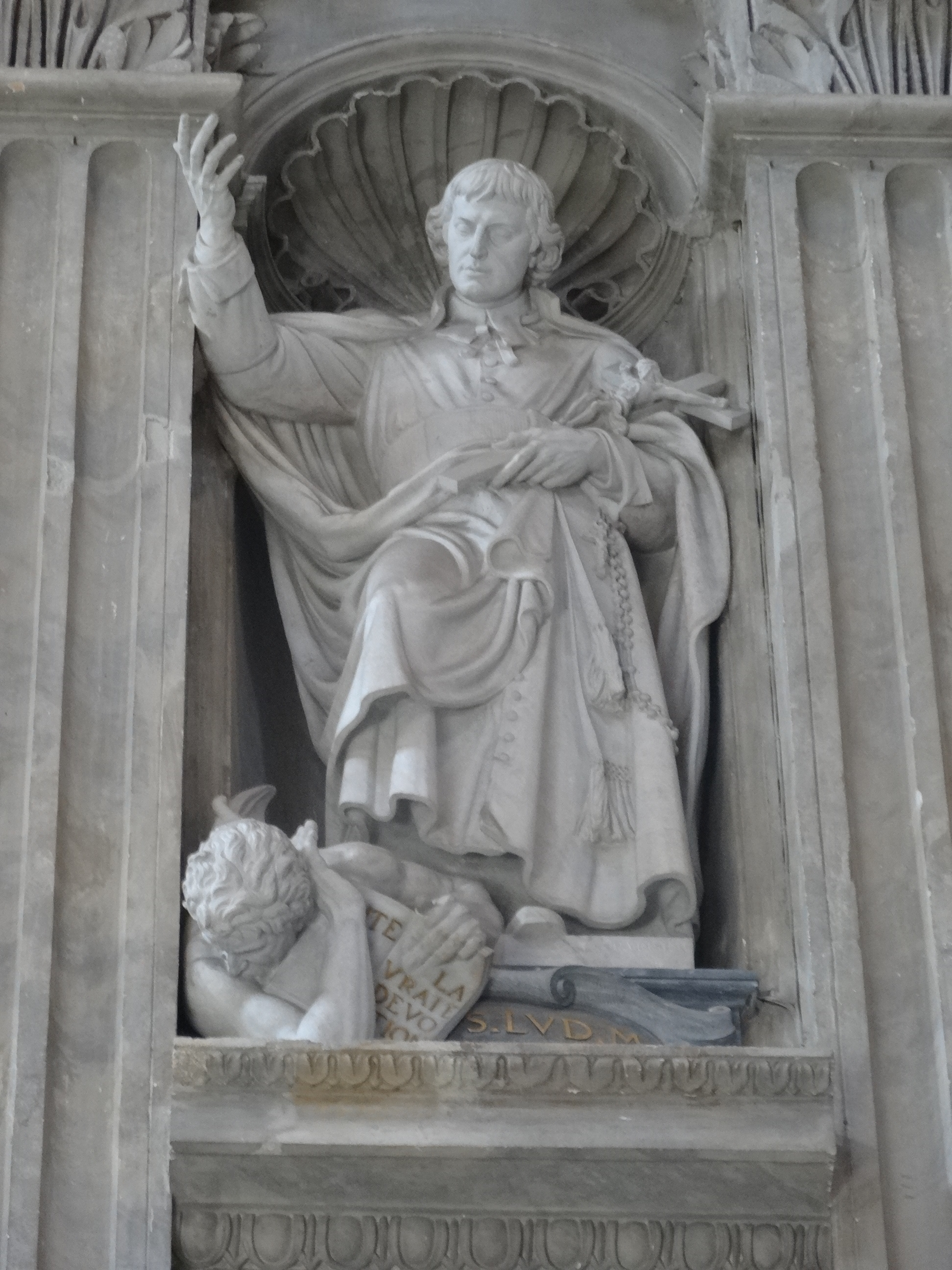
Statue of Louis de Montfort at Saint Peter's Basilica

- "God Alone" was the motto of Montfort and is repeated over 150 times in his writings.
- The Incarnation: "The Incarnation of the Word is for him the absolute central reality."
- Love of the Blessed Virgin Mary
- Fidelity to the Cross
- Missionary Zeal

=== Total consecration to Jesus through Mary ===
In Montfort's approach to Marian consecration, Jesus and Mary are inseparable. He views "consecration to Jesus in Mary" as a special path to being conformed to, united and consecrated to Christ, given that

... of all creatures the one most conformed to Jesus Christ, it follows that among all devotions that which most consecrates and conforms a soul to our Lord is devotion to Mary, his Holy Mother, and that the more a soul is consecrated to her the more will it be consecrated to Jesus Christ.

God the Father made an assemblage of all the waters, and He named it the sea (mare). He has made an assemblage of all His graces, and He has called it Mary (Maria).

According to Montfort, "Mary is the safest, easiest, shortest, and most perfect way of approaching Jesus".

Montfort's process of "total consecration" has seven elements and effects: knowledge of one's unworthiness, sharing in Mary's faith, the gift of pure love, unlimited confidence in God and Mary, communication of the Spirit of Mary, transformation into the likeness of Jesus, and bringing more glory to Christ. His practice of consecration to Mary has both internal and external components. The internal components focus on surrendering oneself as a slave to Mary and to Jesus through her, and performing all actions "with Mary, in Mary, through Mary and for Mary". The suggested exterior practices include enrolment in Marian societies, or joining Marian religious orders, making Marian privileges known and appreciated, and giving alms in honor of Mary.

Louis de Montfort influenced a number of popes. In the 19th century, Pope Pius IX considered it the best and most acceptable form of Marian devotion, while Pope Leo XIII granted indulgences for practicing Montfort's method of Marian consecration. Leo beatified Montfort in 1888, selecting for Montfort's beatification the day of his own Golden jubilee as a priest. In the 20th century Pope Pius X acknowledged the influence of Montfort's writings in the composition of his encyclical Ad diem illum. Pope Pius XI stated that he had practiced Montfort's devotional methods since his early youth. Pope Pius XII declared Montfort a saint and stated that Montfort is the guide "who leads you to Mary and from Mary to Jesus". Pope John Paul II once recalled how as a young seminarian he "read and reread many times and with great spiritual profit" a work of de Montfort and that: "Then I understood that I could not exclude the Lord's Mother from my life without neglecting the will of God-Trinity." According to his Apostolic Letter Rosarium Virginis Mariae, the pontiff's personal motto was "Totus Tuus." The thoughts, writings, and example of Louis de Montfort were also singled out by Pope John Paul II's encyclical Redemptoris Mater as a distinctive witness of Marian spirituality in the Roman Catholic tradition.

== Works ==
Saint Louis de Montfort's writings were compiled and published in their entirety in the collection God Alone: The Collected Writings of St. Louis Marie de Montfort (Montfort Publications, 1987). His principal works include:

- Letters of St. Louis Marie
- The Love of Eternal Wisdom
- Letter to the Friends of the Cross
- The Admirable Secret of the Rosary
- Methods for Saying the Rosary
- The Secret of Mary
- Treatise on True Devotion to the Blessed Virgin
- Prayer for Missionaries
- Manuscript Rule of the Company of Mary
- Letter to the Members of the Company of Mary
- The "Wisdom Cross" of Poitiers
- Original Rule of the Daughters of Wisdom
- Letter to the Inhabitants of Montbernage
- Rules for Various Groups
- The Will of St. Louis Marie
- Morning and Night Prayers

== Priest and poet ==
While Montfort is best known for his spiritual writings, he was also a poet and during his missions managed to compose more than 20,000 verses of hymns. Montfort's hymns and canticles were, for the most part, meant to be sung in village churches and in the homes of the poor. Some authors argue that a reading of Montfort's hymns is essential for an understanding of him as a man and for appreciating his approach to spirituality.

Based on the analysis of Bishop Hendrik Frehen of the Company of Mary, Montfortian hymns fall into two major categories "inspired" and "didactic". The inspired canticles flow spontaneously, on the occasion of a pilgrimage to a Marian shrine, or on the occasion of a joyful celebration. The didactic hymns took more effort and time to compose, and focus on instructional and informative qualities: they teach the audience through the use of a moral and a theme. After Montfort's death, the Company of Mary (which continued his work of preaching parish renewals) made great use of his hymns and used them as instruments of evangelization.

He is also said to have carved at least three statues depicting the Madonna and Child.

== Congregations de Montfort ==
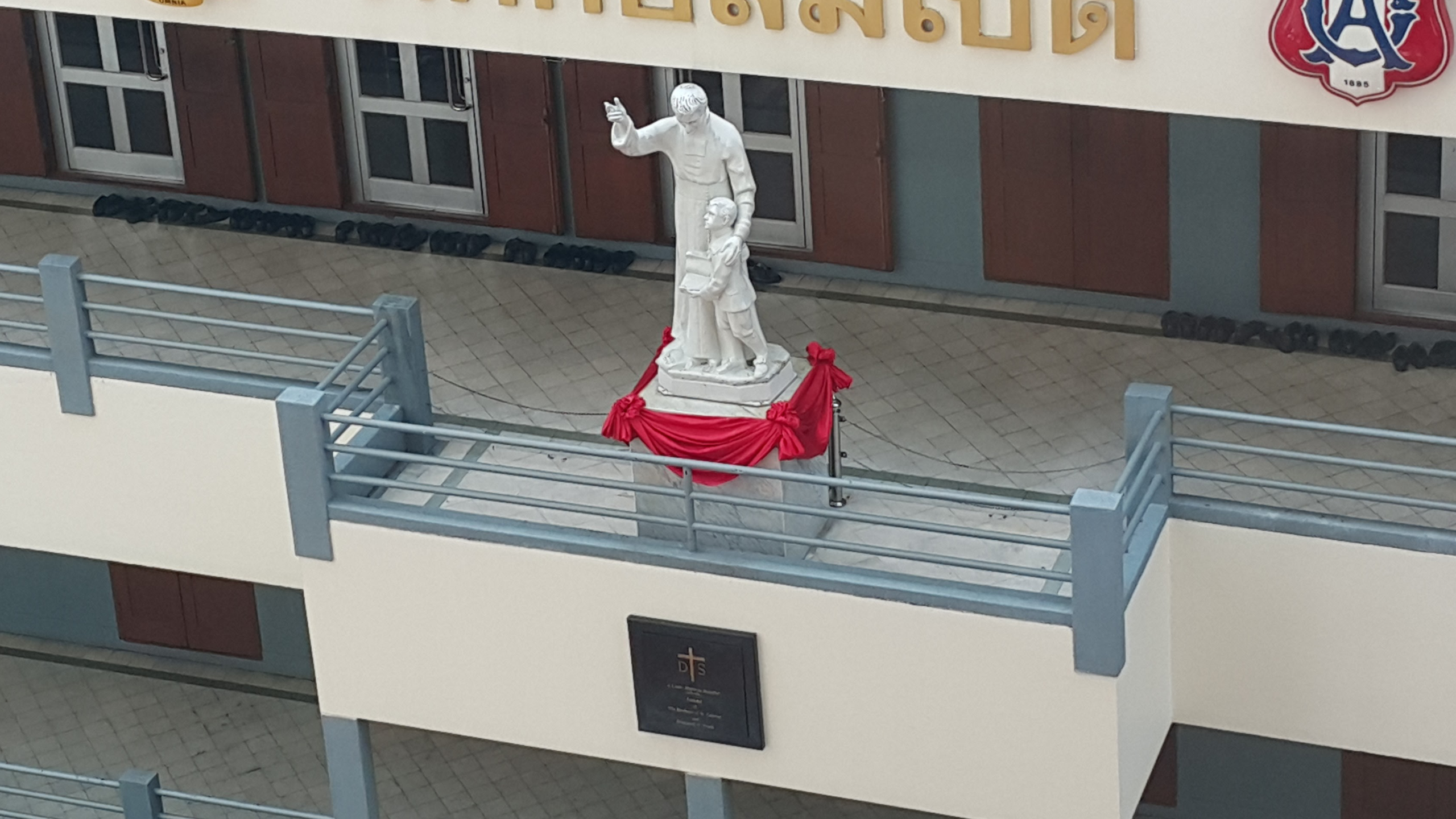
Louis de Montfort sculpture on a building of Assumption College Bangkok, Thailand

The congregations Montfort left behind, the Company of Mary, the Daughters of Wisdom, and the Brothers of Saint Gabriel (which congregation developed from a group of lay-brothers gathered around him), grew and spread, first in France, then throughout the world.

The Servants of the Lord and the Virgin of Matará follow the spirituality of Louis de Montfort.

Montfort's birthplace and tomb are now sites of pilgrimages with about 25,000 visitors each year. The house in which he was born is at No 15, Rue de la Saulnerie in Montfort-sur-Meu. It is now jointly owned by the three Montfortian congregations he formed. The Basilica of Saint Louis de Montfort at Saint-Laurent-sur-Sèvre attracts a number of pilgrims each year.

Montfort is the patron saint of a number of prestigious schools that educate youths from all walks of life, including St. Gabriel's Secondary School and Montfort Secondary School in Singapore, the Assumption College In Thailand, and the Montfort Academy, a private secondary school in Mount Vernon, New York.

== Biographies ==
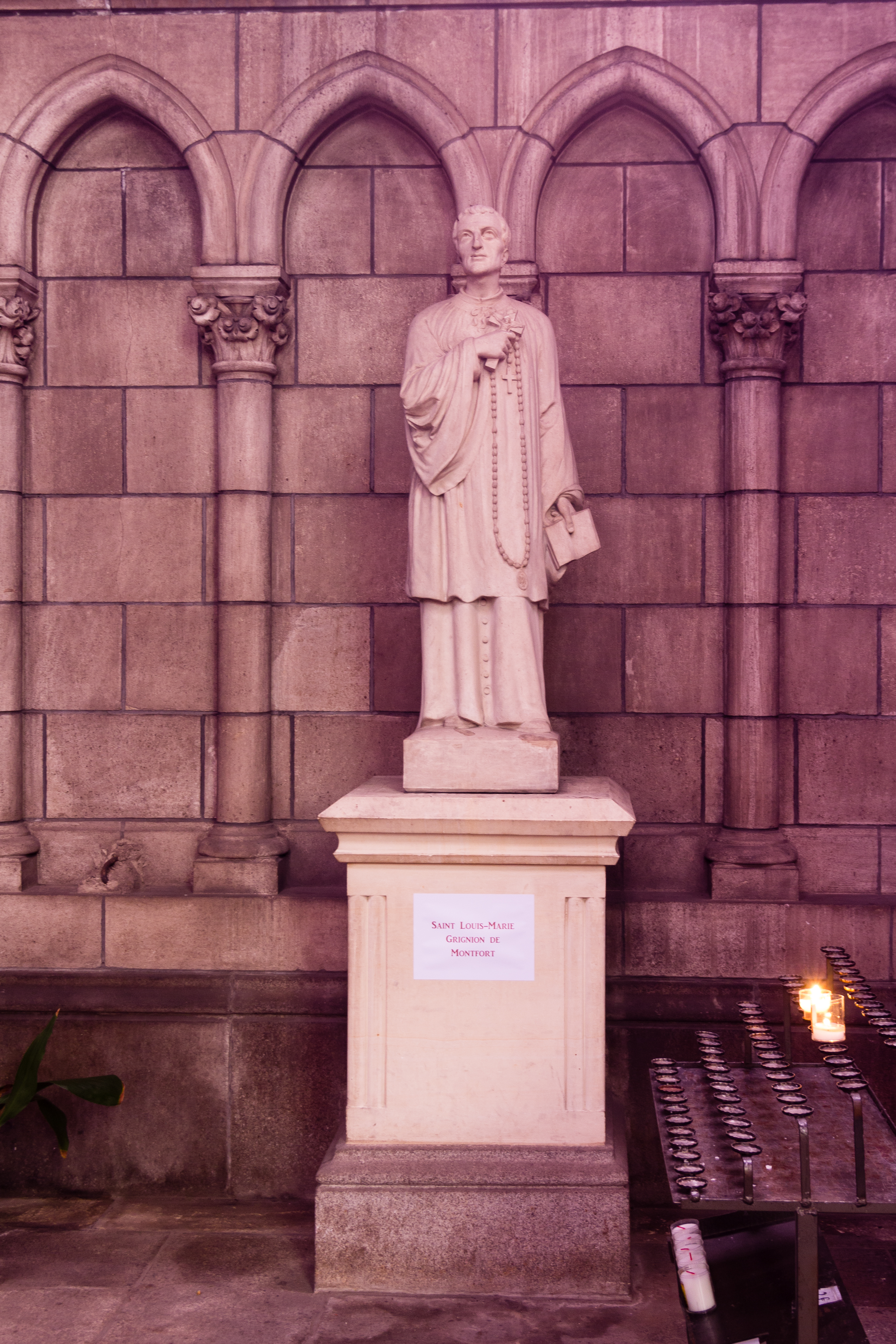
Statue of Montfort at the basilica of Notre-Dame-de-Bonne-Nouvelle in Rennes

There are more than a hundred biographies written of Montfort. They differ in how they reflect the ecclesial and cultural milieu within which each was written.

The first four biographies of Montfort, by Grandet, Blain, Besnard, and Picot de Clorivières, were all written in the eighteenth century. They reflect the hagiographical method current then—the devotional biography. Such an approach reflected little of the critical sensibility that had dominated most of the seventeenth century through the works of the Bollandists, the memorialists of Port-Royal, and Jean de Launoy. They sought to edify, praise, eulogize, and idealize. Such early biographies are filled with anachronism, incoherence, and over-generalization. Despite such limitations, Montfort's early biographers provide valuable material. They have preserved eyewitness accounts and original documents, and they offer a solid historical foundation for reconstructing many of the truths of Montfort's life.

The nineteenth century's "romanticized" conception of history influenced hagiography in two main ways: Although a biography should relive the outer events of a saint's past, it was more important to describe the interior drama of his soul. The nineteenth-century biographies of Montfort reflect this historiographic orientation. Two biographies were prepared for the Montfort's beatification, one by Fonteneau and the other by Persiani. The latter is almost a translation of the former (1887). They limited themselves to recounting the events that took place and did not go into Montfort's psychology. On the other hand, Pauvert (1875) published a collection of Montfort's unpublished letters and established a chronology of the first years of his priesthood. A. Crosnier's biography (1927) was also influenced by nineteenth-century romanticism. Just before Montfort's canonization appeared De Luca (1943). The author took into account the literary and spiritual milieu of seventeenth-century France and attempted to introduce his readers to Montfort's spiritual life, pointing out "phases" in Montfort's growth and development.

Of the different genres of biography that purport to describe the events of someone's life, the "realistic" biography is popular with some today. Such a method is apparent in the four works dedicated by Louis Perouas to Grignion de Montfort (1966, 1973, 1989, 1990). The author separated himself from his predecessors by describing Montfort, his life, and his pastoral work using a historical-critical and psycho-sociological approach. Perouas held that the Breton saint's path was a "tormented journey" because he had difficulty dealing with a strained relationship with his father, who was known for his violent temper. His long and arduous journey toward a balanced life came to a "certain maturation for Father de Montfort when he was in his forties". Generally more acceptable than Perouas' Freudian psychological interpretation is his understanding of Montfort's ministry in the context of the sociological and pastoral realities of his times.

== See also ==
- Saint Louis de Montfort's Prayer to Jesus
