= Outline of the history of Western civilization =

Overview of and topical guide to the history of Western civilization

The following outline is provided as an overview of and topical guide to the history of Western civilization:

History of Western civilization – record of the development of human civilization beginning in Ancient Greece and Ancient Rome, and generally spreading westwards.

Ancient Greek science, philosophy, democracy, architecture, literature, and art provided a foundation embraced and built upon by the Roman Empire as it swept up Europe, including the Hellenic world in its conquests in the 1st century BC. From its European and Mediterranean origins, Western civilization has spread to produce the dominant cultures of modern North America, South America, and much of Oceania, and has had immense global influence in recent centuries.

== Nature of Western civilization ==
- Western world – The first civilizations made various unique contributions to the western civilizations. These contributions, which are likewise the achievements of antiquated civilizations, incorporate certain things in the zones of philosophy, art and engineering, and math and science. The antiquated civilizations were a momentous civilization in that they have made every one of these contributions and achievements while at the same time battling. The most imperative regions of Greek achievement were math and science. They accomplished a wide range of things in the territories of brain science, astronomy, geometry, science, material science, and physics.

In philosophy, first civilizations had made numerous powerful contributions to western civilization. Greek philosophers were capable thinkers who were resolved to look for truth to a specific subject or question regardless of where it drove them. The well-known philosophers trusted that life was not worth living unless it was inspected and the truth about existence was searched out. With a specific end goal to solve problems in life, Socrates created a method for taking care of these problems called the Socratic Method. On the planet today this method is generally known as the Scientific method and is utilized broadly in the region of science. Plato additionally had numerous equitable thoughts which he communicated through his book. Ultimately, Aristotle accepted unequivocally that human reason was critical. These thoughts alongside the thoughts of human thinking, norms for justice, and a majority rules system are as yet utilized as a part of Western civilization. The Western world, also known as the West and the Occident, is a term referring to different nations depending on the context.

  - Western culture – Western culture, sometimes equated with Western civilization or European civilization, is a term used very broadly to refer to a heritage of social norms, ethical values, traditional customs, religious beliefs, political systems, and specific Cultural artifacts and technologies.

== Antiquity: before 500 ==
- Ancient Greek philosophy – Ancient Greek philosophy dealt with a wide variety of subjects, including political philosophy, ethics, metaphysics, ontology, logic, biology, rhetoric, and aesthetics.
- Alexander the Great – Alexander III of Macedon, commonly known as Alexander the Great, was a king of Macedon, a state in northern ancient Greece.
- Ancient Rome – Ancient Rome was a thriving civilization that began growing on the Italian Peninsula as early as the 8th century BCE.
- Roman Empire – The Roman Empire was the post-Roman Republican period of the ancient Roman civilization, characterised by an autocratic form of government and large territorial holdings in Europe and around the Mediterranean.
- Migration Period – The Migration Period, also known as the Barbarian Invasions, was a period of intensified human migration in Europe from about 400 to 800.
- Invasion of the Huns, Attilla the Hun – from 370 to 500; invasion extended into what is now modern France and Germany.

=== Rise of Christendom ===
- Outline of Judaism – Judaism – "religion, philosophy, and way of life" of the Jewish people, based on the ancient Mosaic Law.
- Outline of Christianity – Christianity – monotheistic religion centered on the life and teachings of Jesus of Nazareth as presented in the New Testament.
- History of Christianity – The history of Christianity concerns the Christian religion, its followers and the Church with its various Christian denominations, from the Christianity in the 1st century to the Christianity in the present.
- Western Roman Empire – The Western Roman Empire refers to the western half of the Roman Empire.

== The Middle Ages ==
=== Early Middle Ages: 500–1000 ===
- Saint Patrick – Saint Patrick was a Romano-Briton and Christian missionary, who is the most generally recognized patron saint of Ireland or the Apostle of Ireland, although Brigid of Kildare and Colmcille are also formally patron saints.
- Skellig Michael – literate monks became some of the last preservers in Western Europe of the poetic and philosophical works of Western antiquity. Skellig Michael, also known as Great Skellig, is a steep rocky island in the Atlantic Ocean about 14.5 kilometres from the coast of County Kerry, Republic of Ireland.
- Clovis I – Clovis or Chlodowech was the first King of the Franks to unite all the Frankish tribes under one ruler, changing the leadership from a group of royal chieftains, to rule by kings, ensuring that the kingship was held by his heirs.
- Islam – first preached c. 610 – Islam is a monotheistic and Abrahamic religion articulated by the Qur'an, a Religious text considered by its adherents to be the verbatim word of God in Islam, and by the teachings and normative example of Muhammad, considered by them to be the last prophet of Allah. (Note: There are ten pronunciations of Islam in English, differing in whether the first or second syllable has the stress, whether the s is /z/ or /s/, and whether the a is pronounced /ɑː/, /æ/ or (when the stress is on the first syllable) /ə/ (Merriam Webster). The most common are /ˈɪzləm, ˈɪsləm, ɪzˈlɑːm, ɪsˈlɑːm/ (Oxford English Dictionary, Random House) and /ˈɪzlɑːm, ˈɪslɑːm/ (American Heritage Dictionary).) (Note: /ʔiˈslaːm/: Arabic pronunciation varies regionally. The first vowel ranges from [i]~[ɪ]~[e]. The second vowel ranges from [æ]~[a]~[ä]~[ɛ]. At some geographic regions, such as Northwestern Africa they don't have stress.)
- Al-Andalus (711–1492) – the Islamic empire in southwestern Europe, particularly Spain, Portugal and South France – The term caliphate, "dominion of a caliph ", refers to the first system of government established in Islam and represented the leaders unity of the Muslim Ummah.
- Charles Martel – in 732, stopped Islamic advance into Europe. Charles Martel, also known as Charles the Hammer, was a Frankish military and political leader, who served as Mayor of the Palace under the Merovingian kings and ruled de facto during an interregnum at the end of his life, using the title Duke and Prince of the Franks.
- Charlemagne – Charlemagne also known as Charles the Great, was King of the Franks from 768 and Holy Roman Emperor from 800 to his death in 814.
- Alfred the Great – Alfred the Great was King of Wessex from 871 to 899.
  - Norse colonization of the Americas – The Norse colonization of the Americas began as early as the 10th century, when Norse sailors explored and settled areas of the North Atlantic, including the northeastern fringes of North America.

=== High Middle Ages: 1000–1300 ===
- Holy Roman Empire in Germany and central Europe, established in 962 (survives until 1806)
- Feudalism – Feudalism was a set of legal and military customs in medieval Europe that flourished between the 9th and 15th centuries, which, broadly defined, was a system for structuring society around relationships derived from the holding of land in exchange for service or labour.
- Catholic Church – The Catholic Church, also known as the Roman Catholic Church, is the world's largest Christian church, with more than one billion members.
  - Franciscans – Most Franciscans are members of Roman Catholic religious orders founded by Saint Francis of Assisi in 1209.
  - Dominican Order – The Order of Preachers, after the 15th century more commonly known as the Dominican Order or Dominicans, is a Roman Catholic religious order founded by Saint Dominic and approved by Pope Honorius III on 22 December 1216 in France.
  - Devotion to the Virgin Mary – Roman Catholic Mariology is theology concerned with the Virgin Mary, the mother of Jesus Christ as developed by the Catholic Church.
- Chivalry – Chivalry, or the chivalric code, is the traditional code of conduct associated with the medieval institution of knighthood.
- Crusades – The Crusades were a series of religious expeditionary wars blessed by the Pope and the Catholic Church, with the stated goal of restoring Christian access to the holy places in and near Jerusalem.
- Cathedral schools – began in the Early Middle Ages as centers of advanced education, some of them ultimately evolving into medieval universities. Some of these institutions continued into modern times.
- Scholasticism – Scholasticism is a method of critical thought which dominated teaching by the academics of medieval universities in Europe from about 1100–1500, and a program of employing that method in articulating and defending orthodoxy in an increasingly pluralistic context.
- Scientific method – Scientific method refers to a body of Scientific techniques for investigating phenomena, acquiring new knowledge, or correcting and integrating previous knowledge.
- Saint Anselm – Anselm of Canterbury is called the founder of scholasticism and is famous as the originator of the ontological argument for the existence of God.
- Walk to Canossa – The Walk to Canossa refers to both the trek itself of Henry IV of the Holy Roman Empire from Speyer to the fortress at Canossa in Emilia Romagna and to the events surrounding his journey, which took place in and around January 1077.
- Magna Carta – Magna Carta, also called Magna Carta Libertatum, is an English charter, originally issued in the year 1215 and reissued later in the 13th century in modified versions.
- Battle of Agincourt – The Battle of Agincourt was a major English victory against a numerically superior French army in the Hundred Years' War.
- Parliament of England – The Parliament of England was the legislature of the Kingdom of England.
- University – A university is an institution of higher education and research which grants academic degrees in a variety of subjects and provides both undergraduate education and postgraduate education.
- Mongol invasion of Russia, Hungary, and other areas, 13th century.

=== Late Middle Ages: 1300–1500 ===
- Western Schism – The Western Schism or Papal Schism was a split within the Catholic Church from 1378 to 1417.
- Hundred Years War – An extremely protracted conflict between England and France lasting from 1337 to 1453.
- Ottoman Turks – The Ottoman Turks were the Turkish-speaking population of the Ottoman Empire who formed the base of the state's military and ruling classes.
- Fall of Constantinople – The Fall of Constantinople was the capture of Constantinople, the capital of the Byzantine Empire, which occurred after a siege by the Ottoman Empire, under the command of 21-year-old Ottoman Sultan Mehmed II, against the defending army commanded by Byzantine emperor Constantine XI Palaiologos.
- Middle class – The middle class is a class of people in the middle of a societal hierarchy, also known as bourgeoisie, or burghers.
- Black Death – Kills between 1/3 to 1/2 of Europe's population.

== Renaissance and reformation ==
=== The Renaissance: 14th to 17th Century ===
- Italian Renaissance – The Italian Renaissance was the earliest manifestation of the general European Renaissance, a period of great cultural change and achievement that began in Italy around the end of the 13th century and lasted until the 16th century, marking the transition between medieval and Early Modern Europe.
- Johannes Gutenberg – Johannes Gensfleisch zur Laden zum Gutenberg was a German blacksmith, goldsmith, printer, and publisher who introduced printing to Europe.
- Desiderius Erasmus – Desiderius Erasmus Roterodamus, known as Erasmus of Rotterdam, was a Dutch Renaissance humanist, Roman Catholic priest, social critic, teacher, and theologian.
- Thomas More – Sir Thomas More, known by Catholics as Saint Thomas More since 1935, was an English lawyer, social philosopher, author, statesman, and noted Renaissance humanist.
- Christopher Columbus – Christopher Columbus was an explorer, colonizer, and navigator, born in the Republic of Genoa, in what is today northwestern Italy.
- Leonardo da Vinci – Leonardo di ser Piero da Vinci was an Italian Renaissance polymath: painter, sculptor, architect, musician, scientist, mathematician, engineer, inventor, anatomist, geologist, cartographer, botanist, and writer whose genius, perhaps more than that of any other figure, epitomized the Renaissance humanist ideal.
- Vasco da Gama – Vasco da Gama, 1st Count of Vidigueira, was a Portuguese explorer, one of the most successful in the Age of Discovery and the commander of the first ships to sail directly from Europe to India.
- liberation of Spain – The Reconquista was a period of almost 800 years in the Middle Ages during which several Christian kingdoms succeeded in retaking the Muslim-controlled areas of the Iberian Peninsula broadly known as Al-Andalus.
- Siege of Vienna – The Siege of Vienna in 1529 was the first attempt by the Ottoman Empire, led by Suleiman the Magnificent, to capture the city of Vienna, Austria.
- Nicolaus Copernicus – Nicolaus Copernicus was a Renaissance astronomer and the first person to formulate a comprehensive heliocentric cosmology which displaced the Earth from the center of the universe.

== The reformation: 1500–1650 ==
- Protestantism – a denomination of Christianity formed by Martin Luther, which split from Catholicism in the early 16th Century, causing much conflict and strife.
- Reformation – a term referring to the process by which Protestantism emerged and gained supporters.
- Counter Reformation – the backlash to the Reformation by Catholicism, resulting in a great deal of fighting, most notably the 30 Years War.
  - 30 Years War – a conflict fought mainly in the Germanic states involving virtually all countries in Europe, fought over religious preeminence.

== Rise of Western empires: 1500–1800 ==
- Age of Discovery – The Age of Discovery, also known as the Age of Exploration and the Great Navigations, was a period in history starting in the early 15th century and continuing into the early 17th century during which Europeans engaged in intensive exploration of the world, establishing direct contact with Africa, the Americas, Asia and Oceania and mapping the planet.
- Colonial empire – The Colonial empires were a product of the European Age of Exploration that began with a race of exploration between the then most advanced maritime powers, Portugal and Spain, in the 15th century.
- Mercantilism – Mercantilism is the economic doctrine in which government control of foreign trade is of paramount importance for ensuring the prosperity and military security of the state.

=== Enlightenment ===
- Divine right of kings – The divine right of kings, or divine-right theory of kingship, is a political and religious doctrine of royal and political legitimacy.
- Age of Enlightenment – The period during which superstitions were rejected in favor of science and logic, typically thought of as the dawn of modern science.

=== Revolution: 1770–1815 ===
- United States Declaration of Independence – The Declaration of Independence was a statement adopted by the Second Continental Congress on July 4, 1776, which announced that the thirteen American colonies, then at war with Great Britain, regarded themselves as independent states, and no longer a part of the British Empire.
  - American Revolution – The American Revolution was the political upheaval during the last half of the 18th century in which the Thirteen Colonies in North America collaborated to break free from the British Empire, combining to become the United States of America.
- French Revolution – The French Revolution, was a period of radical social and political upheaval in France that had a major impact on France and indeed all of Europe.

=== Napoleonic Wars ===
- First French Empire – The First French Empire, also known as the Greater French Empire or Napoleonic Empire, was the empire of Napoleon I of France|Napoleon I of France.
  - French invasion of Russia – A disastrous military campaign in which Napoleon, with his armies, attempted to seize Russia. Instead of fighting conventionally, Russian forces merely retreated, taking all of the food with them, resulting in Napoleon reaching Moscow but his armies dying of hunger.
  - Kingdom of Spain (Napoleonic) – The Kingdom of Spain was a short-lived client state of the French Empire that briefly existed during the Peninsular War, a contest between France and the allied powers of Spain, the United Kingdom, and Portugal for control of the Iberian Peninsula during the Napoleonic Wars.

== 1815–1870 ==
=== Rise of the English-speaking world: 1815–1870 ===
- Industrial Revolution – The Industrial Revolution was a period from 1750 to 1850 where changes in agriculture, manufacturing, mining, transportation, and technology had a profound effect on the social, economic and cultural conditions of the times.
  - Luddite – The Luddites were a social movement of 19th-century English textile artisans who protested – often by destroying mechanized looms – against the changes produced by the Industrial Revolution, that replaced them with less skilled, low wage labour, and which they felt were leaving them without work and changing their way of life.

==== United Kingdom and British Empire: 1815–1870 ====
- British Empire – The British Empire comprised the dominions, Crown colonies, protectorates, League of Nations mandates and other territories ruled or administered by the United Kingdom.
- Pax Britannica – Pax Britannica was the period of relative peace in Europe and the world during which the British Empire controlled most of the key maritime trade routes and enjoyed unchallenged sea power.
- Constitutional monarchy – Constitutional monarchy is a form of government in which a monarch acts as head of state within the parameters of a constitution, whether it be a written, uncodified, or blended constitution.
- Abolitionism – Abolitionism is a movement to end slavery.
- Canada – Canada is a North American country consisting of ten provinces and three territories.
- Australia – The history of Australia from 1788 to 1850 covers the early colonies period of Australia's history, from the arrival of the First Fleet of British ships at Sydney to establish the penal colony of New South Wales in 1788 to the European exploration of the continent and establishment of other colonies and the beginnings of autonomous democratic government.
- New Zealand – New Zealand is an island country located in the southwestern Pacific Ocean.

==== United States: 1815–1870 ====
- Louisiana Purchase – The Louisiana Purchase was the acquisition by the United States of America of France's claim to the territory of Louisiana in 1803.
- Oregon Country – The Oregon Country was a predominantly American term referring to a disputed ownership region of the Pacific Northwest of North America.
- Abraham Lincoln – Abraham Lincoln was the 16th President of the United States, serving from March 1861 until his assassination in April 1865.
- Confederate States of America – The Confederate States of America was a government set up from 1861 to 1865 by eleven Southern slave states that had declared their secession from the United States.
- Emancipation Proclamation – The Emancipation Proclamation is an executive order issued by United States President Abraham Lincoln on January 1, 1863, during the American Civil War using his war powers.
- Alaska – also known as Seward's Folly, the Alaska territory was purchased by the United States from Russia in 1867.

=== Fall of the Spanish Empire: 1833–1898 ===
- Spanish American wars of independence from death of Ferdinand VII (1833) to 1898
- Spanish–American War

=== Continental Europe: 1815–1870 ===
- Decline and modernization of the Ottoman Empire – The decline of the Ottoman Empire is the period that followed after the stagnation of the Ottoman Empire in which the empire experienced several economic and political setbacks.
- Austria-Hungary or Austro-Hungarian Empire, formed in 1867, ends during World War I.
- North German Confederation – The North German Confederation was a federation of 22 independent states of northern Germany, with nearly 30 million inhabitants.
- German Empire – common name given to the state officially named the Deutsches Reich, designating Germany from the unification of Germany and proclamation of Wilhelm I as German Emperor on 18 January 1871, to 1918, when it became a federal republic after defeat in World War I and the abdication of the Kaiser Wilhelm II.

== Culture, arts and sciences 1815-1914 ==
- Concordat of 1801 – The Concordat of 1801 was an agreement between Napoleon and Pope Pius VII, signed on 15 July 1801.
- Congress of Vienna – The Congress of Vienna was a conference of ambassadors of European states chaired by Austrian statesman Klemens Wenzel von Metternich, and held in Vienna from September 1814 to June 1815.
- United Kingdom of Great Britain and Ireland – The United Kingdom of Great Britain and Ireland was the formal name of the United Kingdom during the period when it included the territory now known as the Republic of Ireland.
- Louis Pasteur – Louis Pasteur was a French chemist and microbiologist born in Dole. His body lies beneath the Institute Pasteur in Paris in a spectacular vault covered in depictions of his accomplishments in Byzantine mosaics.
- Joseph Lister – A pioneer of antiseptic surgery, who greatly reduced the mortality rate for many operations.
- Periodic table – The periodic table is a tabular display of the chemical elements, organized on the basis of their properties.
- Neoclassicism – Neoclassicism is the name given to Western Cultural movements in the decorative and visual arts, literature, theatre, music, and architecture that draw inspiration from the "classical" art and culture of Ancient Greece or Ancient Rome.
- Romanticism – Romanticism was an artistic, literary, and intellectual movement that originated in Europe toward the end of the 18th century and in most areas was at its peak in the approximate period from 1800 to 1840.
- Realism – In philosophy, Realism, or Realist or Realistic are terms that describe manifestations of philosophical realism, the belief that reality exists independently of observers.
- Impressionism – Impressionism was a 19th-century art movement that originated with a group of Paris-based artists whose independent art exhibition|exhibitions brought them to prominence during the 1870s and 1880s in spite of harsh opposition from the art community in France.

== New imperialism: 1870–1914 ==
- Scramble for Africa – The Scramble for Africa, also known as the Race for Africa or Partition of Africa, was a process of invasion, occupation, colonization and annexation of African territory by European powers during the New Imperialism period, between 1881 and World War I in 1914.
- Opium Wars – The Opium Wars, also known as the Anglo-Chinese Wars, divided into the First Opium War from 1839 to 1842 and the Second Opium War from 1856 to 1860, were the climax of disputes over trade and diplomatic relations between China under the Qing Dynasty and the British Empire.
- Boxer Rebellion – The Boxer Rebellion, also known as Boxer Uprising or Yihetuan Movement, was a proto-Chinese nationalist movement by the "Righteous Harmony Society" in China between 1898 and 1901, opposing foreign imperialism and Christianity.
- Russo-Turkish War (1877–1878) – A short lived conflict over several territories in the Caucasus, most notably Armenia, in reaction to a Turkish massacre of Armenians.
- Antarctica – The last continent to be discovered, and the outlet for much Imperial ambition, until it was realised that the remoteness of the continent made a settlement impossible.

== Great powers and the First World War: 1870–1918 ==
=== United States: 1870–1914 ===
- Reconstruction – The period following the Civil War during which African Americans were granted status equal to Caucasians. After several years of this, a backlash reversed many of these reforms.
- Jim Crow laws enforcing racial segregation in the U.S. are enacted in states and localities from 1876 until the modern Civil Rights Movement of the 1960s.

=== Europe: 1870–1914 ===
- Franco-Prussian War – The Franco-Prussian War or Franco-German War, often referred to in France as the 1870 War, was a conflict between the Second French Empire and the Kingdom of Prussia.
- German Empire – The German Empire is the common name given to the state officially named the Deutsches Reich, designating Germany from the unification of Germany and proclamation of Wilhelm I as German Emperor on 18 January 1871, to 1918, when it became a federal republic after defeat in World War I and the abdication of the Kaiser Wilhelm II.

=== British dominions: 1870–1914 ===
- Constitution Act, 1867 – The Constitution Act, 1867, is a major part of Canada's Constitution, that created the Dominion of Canada from colonies of the former British North America.
- Dominion of New Zealand – The Dominion of New Zealand is the former name of the Realm of New Zealand.

=== New alliances ===
- Triple Alliance – a militaristic alliance made between Germany, Austria-Hungary, and Italy. In World War I, these countries (with the exception of Italy) fought against those in the Triple Entente.
- Triple Entente – an alliance between Britain, France, and Russia. This alliance, supplemented with others, was a counterbalance to the Triple Alliance.

=== World War I (1914-1918) ===
- Archduke Franz Ferdinand of Austria – Franz Ferdinand was an Archduke of Austria-Este, Austro-Hungarian and Royal Prince of Hungary and of Bohemia, and from 1889 until his death, heir presumptive to the Austro-Hungarian throne.
- Western Front – Western Front was a term used during the First and Second World Wars to describe the contested armed frontier between lands controlled by Germany to the east and the Allies to the west.
- Artificial explosives – after all of the German supplies of natural explosives such as saltpeter were blockaded by the British Navy, Germany pioneered artificial explosives, ironically made from American fertilizer.
- League of Nations – The League of Nations, was an intergovernmental organisation founded as a result of the Paris Peace Conference that ended the First World War.

== Inter-war years: 1918–1939 ==
- Women's rights movement succeeds in securing the right for women to vote in national elections in many Western countries following World War I, including in Great Britain, Canada, Australia, New Zealand, and the United States.

=== United States in the inter-war years ===
- Great Depression – The Great Depression was a severe worldwide economic depression in the decade preceding World War II.
- Dust Bowl – The Dust Bowl, or the Dirty Thirties, was a period of severe dust storms causing major ecological and agricultural damage to American and Canadian prairie lands in the 1930s, particularly in 1934 and 1936.

=== Europe in the inter-war years ===
- War reparations – Following World War I, the League of Nations saddled the former Triple Alliance countries with massive amounts of war reparations in repayment for their aggressive actions. These, along with the Depression greatly reduced quality of life in these countries.

=== British dominions in the inter-war years ===
- Balfour Declaration – The Balfour Declaration was a letter from the United Kingdom's Foreign Secretary Arthur James Balfour to Walter Rothschild, Baron Rothschild, a leader of the British Jewish community, for transmission to the Zionist Federation of Great Britain and Ireland.

=== Rise of totalitarianism ===
- Lateran Treaty – The Lateran Treaty is one of the Lateran Pacts of 1929 or Lateran Accords, agreements made in 1929 between the Kingdom of Italy and the Holy See, and ratified June 7, 1929, ending the "Roman Question".
  - Vatican City – Vatican City, or Vatican City State, in Italian officially Stato della Città del Vaticano, is a landlocked sovereign city-state whose territory consists of a walled enclave within the city of Rome, Italy.
  - Adolf Hitler – Adolf Hitler was an Austrian-born German politician and the leader of the National Socialist German Workers Party, commonly referred to as the Nazi Party.
- Spanish Civil War – The Republicans, who were loyal to the democratic, left-leaning and relatively urban Second Spanish Republic, in an alliance of convenience with the Anarchists, fought against the Nationalists, a Falangist, Carlist, and largely aristocratic conservative group led by General Francisco Franco, from 1936 to 1939.
  - Francisco Franco – Francisco Franco y Bahamonde, better known under the name of Franco, was a Spanish general, dictator and the leader of the Nationalist military rebellion in the Spanish Civil War, and totalitarian head of state of Spain, from October 1936 until his death in November 1975.

== Second World War and its aftermath: 1939–1950 ==
- Allies – The countries fighting against the Axis powers during World War II.
- Battle of Britain – The Battle of Britain is the name given to the World War II air campaign waged by the German Air Force against the United Kingdom during the summer and autumn of 1940.
- Pearl Harbor – Pearl Harbor, known to Hawaiians as Puuloa, is a lagoon harbor on the island of Oahu, Hawaii, west of Honolulu, Hawaii.
- Pacific War – The Pacific War, also sometimes called the Asia-Pacific War refers broadly to the parts of World War II that took place in the Pacific Ocean, its islands, and in East Asia, then called the Far East.
  - Sandakan Death Marches – The Sandakan Death Marches were a series of forced marches in Borneo from Sandakan to Ranau, Malaysia which resulted in the deaths of more than 3,600 Indonesian civilian slave labourers and 2,400 Allied prisoners of war held captive by the Empire of Japan during the Pacific campaign of World War II at prison camps in North Borneo.
  - Battle of Midway – The Battle of Midway is widely regarded as the most important naval battle of the Pacific Campaign of World War II.
- The Holocaust – The Holocaust, also known as the Shoah, was the genocide of approximately six million European Jews and 5 million other people during World War II, a programme of systematic state-sponsored murder by Nazi Germany, led by Adolf Hitler, throughout Nazi-occupied territory.
- United Nations – The United Nations, is an international organization whose stated aims are facilitating cooperation in international law, international security, economic development, social progress, human rights, and achievement of world peace.
- West Germany – West Germany is the common English name for the Federal Republic of Germany or FRG in the period between its creation in May 1949 to German reunification on 3 October 1990.
- East Germany – The German Democratic Republic, informally known as East Germany, was a socialist state established by the USSR in 1949 in the Soviet zone of occupied Germany, including East Berlin of the Allied-occupied capital city.

== Fall of the Western empires: 1945–1980 ==
- List of countries that gained independence from the United Kingdom
- List of national independence days
- First Indochina War – France loses southeast Asian territories from 1946 to 1954.
- Indian Independence Act 1947
- Partition of India (1947)
- Belgian Congo (1908 to 1960)

== Cold War: 1945–1991 ==
- Satellite states – Small, relatively powerless countries supported by larger ones. Examples include North Korea (supported by China and the Soviet Union.
- Chinese Civil War – The Chinese Civil War was a civil war fought between the Kuomintang, the governing party of the Republic of China, and the Chinese Communist Party, for the control of China which eventually led to China's division into two Chinas, Republic of China in Taiwan and People's Republic of China in the mainland.
- Cuban Missile Crisis – The Cuban Missile Crisis, known as the October Crisis in Cuba and the Caribbean Crisis in the USSR was a thirteen-day confrontation between the Soviet Union and Cuba on one side and the United States on the other; the crisis occurred in October 1962, during the Cold War.
- Vietnam War – A war that occurred in Vietnam, Laos, and Cambodia from 1 November 1955 to the fall of Saigon on 30 April 1975. It was the second of the Indochina Wars and was officially fought between North Vietnam and the government of South Vietnam. The North Vietnamese army was supported by the Soviet Union, China and other communist allies and the South Vietnamese army was supported by the United States, South Korea, Australia, Thailand and other anti-communist allies.
- Afghanistan – Afghanistan, officially the Islamic Republic of Afghanistan, is a landlocked sovereign country located in the centre of Asia, forming part of South Asia, Central Asia, and Greater Middle East, it is also considered to be part of a broader West Asia.
- Détente – Détente is the easing of strained relations, especially in a political situation.
- Revolutions of 1989 – The Revolutions of 1989 were the revolutions which overthrew the communist regimes in various Central and Eastern European countries.

== Western countries: 1945–1980 ==
- Sexual revolution – Liberal western views on sexual morality and premarital sex since the legalization and widespread use of the contraceptive pill in the 1960s.

=== North America: 1945–1980 ===
- Middle class – The middle class is a class of people in the middle of a societal hierarchy.
- Civil Rights Act – Civil Rights Act may refer to several Acts of Congress in the history of civil rights in the United States, including:
- Voting Rights Act – The Voting Rights Act of 1965 is a landmark piece of national legislation in the United States that outlawed discriminatory voting practices that had been responsible for the widespread disenfranchisement of African Americans in the U.S.
- Vietnam War – A highly controversial conflict in which the United States sided with South Vietnam in resistance to the Communist north, ruled by the Viet Cong.
- Stonewall riots – 1969 riot spurs the modern gay rights movement in the United States.
- Roe v. Wade – landmark decision legalizing abortion on demand in the United States; it has a liberalizing influence on laws in other Western countries.

=== Europe ===
- Charles de Gaulle – Charles André Joseph Marie de Gaulle was a French general and statesman who led the Free French Forces during World War II.
- Provisional Irish Republican Army – The Provisional Irish Republican Army is an Irish republican paramilitary organisation whose aim was to remove Northern Ireland from the United Kingdom and bring about a socialist republic within a united Ireland by force of arms and political persuasion.
- ETA – ETA, an acronym for Euskadi Ta Askatasuna is an armed Basque nationalist and separatist organization.
- European Economic Community – The European Economic Community was an international organisation created by the 1957 Treaty of Rome.
  - European Union – The European Union is an economic and political union or confederation of 27 member states which are located primarily in Europe.

=== Australia and New Zealand: 1945–1980 ===
- ANZUS – The Australia, New Zealand, United States Security Treaty collective security military alliance

=== Western culture: 1945–1980 ===
- Second Vatican Council – The Second Vatican Council addressed relations between the Roman Catholic Church and the modern world.
- Counterculture of the 1960s – The counterculture of the 1960s refers to a cultural event that mainly developed in the United States and United Kingdom and spread throughout much of the western world between 1960 and 1973.
- Conservatism – Conservatism is a political and social philosophy that promotes the maintenance of traditional institutions and supports, at the most, minimal and gradual change in society.
- Political repression – Political repression is the persecution of an individual or group for political reasons, particularly for the purpose of restricting or preventing their ability to take political life of society.
- institutional racism – Institutional racism describes any kind of system of inequality based on race.

== Western nations: 1980–Continuing ==
- World Trade Organization – The World Trade Organization is an organisation that intends to supervise and liberalize international trade.
- North American Free Trade Agreement – The North American Free Trade Agreement is an agreement signed by the governments of Canada, Mexico, and the United States, creating a trilateral trade bloc in North America.
- African National Congress – The African National Congress is South Africa's governing political party, supported by its tripartite alliance with the Congress of South African Trade Unions and the South African Communist Party, since the establishment of non-racial democracy in April 1994.
- World Trade Center – The original World Trade Center was a complex with seven buildings featuring landmark twin towers in Lower Manhattan, New York City, United States.
- Funeral of Pope John Paul II – The funeral of Pope John Paul II was held on 8 April 2005, six days after his death on 2 April.
- German reunification (1990)
- Maastricht Treaty (1993) – establishes the European Union in its current form of an economic union

=== Western nations and the world ===
- al-Qaeda – al-Qaeda is a global militant Islamist organization founded by Osama bin Laden in Peshawar sometime between August 1988 and late 1989.
- September 11 attacks – The September 11 attacks were a series of four suicide attacks that were committed in the United States on September 11, 2001, coordinated to strike the areas of New York City and Washington, D.C. (Note: 9/11 is pronounced "nine eleven". The slash is not part of the pronunciation. The name is frequently used in British English as well as American English even though the dating conventions differ: "9/11" in British English would normally refer to 9 November.)

=== Western society and culture (since 1980) ===
- Same-sex marriage – The struggle for gay rights which began in the 1970s culminates in the ongoing fight for the recognition of same-sex marriages. By the mid-2000s (decade), several western nations (Netherlands, Denmark, Canada, and Spain) had given full legal recognition to married gay or lesbian couples.

== Western Civilization: Future (2001-Present) ==
- Globalization – The 21st century gives rise to the Information Age, and with it a new stage in the evolution of society. The United States of America along with other nations, western and eastern, helping to transition into a society beyond the polarization of beliefs. Creating a new, more interconnected world, with technological achievements such as the internet continuing to lead the way.

== Western civilization publications ==
- Greek Ways: How the Greeks Created Western Civilization by Bruce Thornton, Encounter Books, 2002
- How the Irish Saved Civilization: The Untold Story of Ireland's Heroic Role from the Fall of Rome to the Rise of Medieval Europe by Thomas Cahill, 1995.
- Atlas of World Military History, edited by Richard Brooks. New York: HarperCollins, 2000.
- A Military History of the Western World. Three Volumes. By J.F.C. Fuller. New York: Da Capo Press, 1987 and 1988.
- The History of the Decline and Fall of the Roman Empire – the original was published between 1776 and 1789 in six volumes by the firm of Strahan & Cadell, in the Strand, London.

== See also ==
- Outline of history
- History of Europe
