= Mariology of the saints =

Contributions of Roman Catholic saints to Mariology

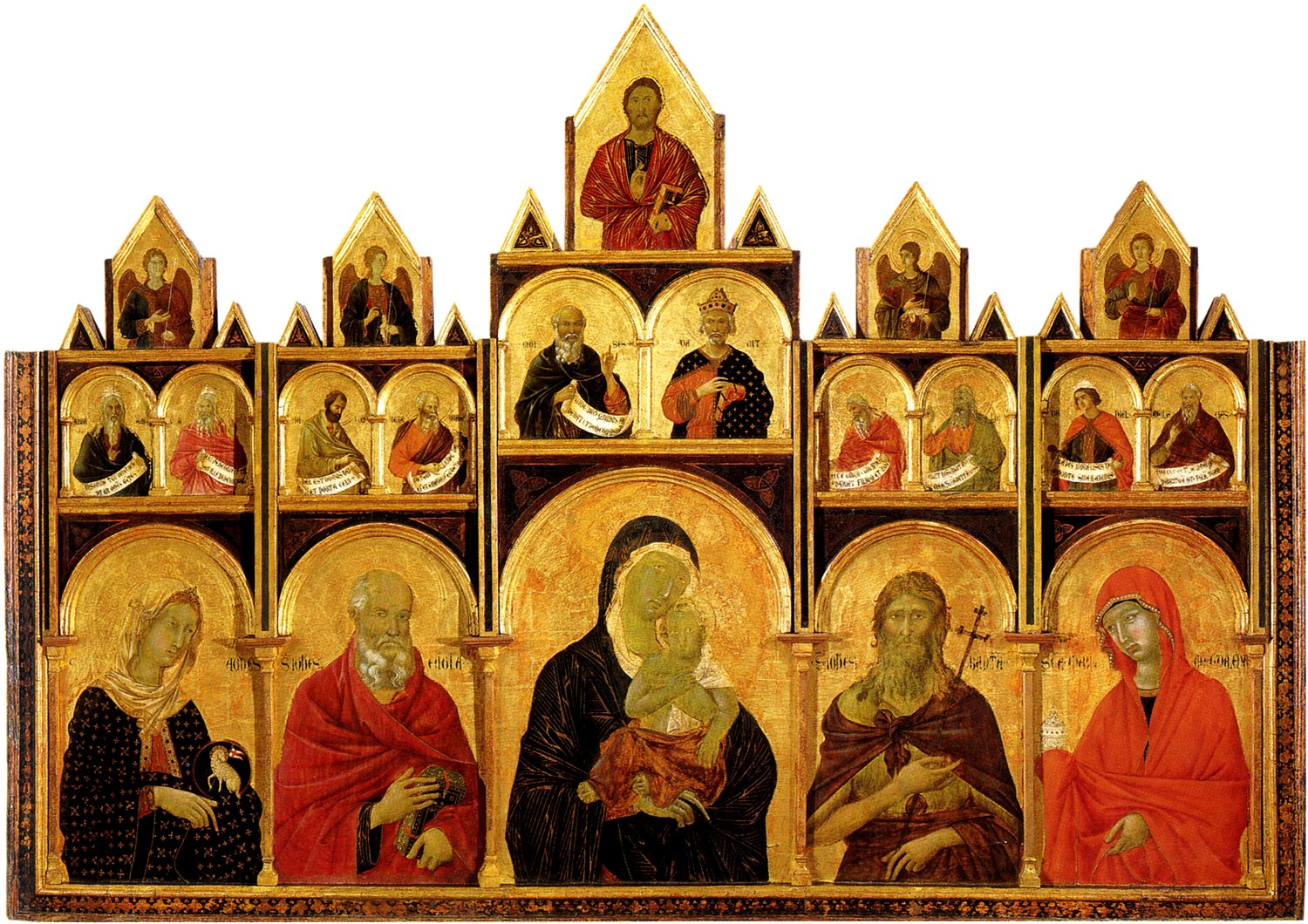
Madonna and Child with saints by Duccio, 14th century

Throughout history, Catholic Mariology has been influenced by a number of saints who have attested to the central role of Mary in God's plan of salvation. The analysis of Early Church Fathers continues to be reflected in modern encyclicals. Irenaeus vigorously defended the title of "Theotokos" or Mother of God. The views of Anthony of Padua, Robert Bellarmine and others supported the doctrine of the Immaculate Conception of the Virgin Mary, which was declared a dogma in 1850.

Writings of the saints have contributed to both popular piety and a greater understanding of Mary's role in salvation history.

== Early saints ==
=== Irenaeus of Lyons ===
One of the earliest images of Mary in Christian tradition is that of the "New Eve". Irenaeus of Lyons (circa 140–202) is perhaps the earliest of the Church Fathers to develop a thorough Mariology. In his youth he had met Polycarp and other Christians who had been in direct contact with the Apostles. Following Romans 5, his analysis is both scriptural and Christological, presenting Christ as the "New Adam". Irenaeus expands upon the thought of Justin Martyr (100–165), and illustrates the distinction between Eve and Mary in both Adversus haereses (Against Heresies) and in Demonstratio Apostolicae Praedicationis (Proof of the Apostolic Preaching).

According to Irenaeus, Christ, being born out of the Virgin Mary, created a totally new historical situation. This view influenced Ambrose of Milan and Tertullian, who wrote about the virginal conception of the Mother of God. Pope Pius IX made reference to this theme of Irenaeus in the 1854 apostolic constitution Ineffabilis Deus, which defined the dogma of the Immaculate Conception.

=== Ambrose of Milan ===
Saint Ambrose of Milan (339–397), Bishop of Milan and Doctor of the Church, was one of the most influential ecclesiastical figures of the fourth century. A student of Simplician, the virginity of Mary and her role as Mother of God were central to his views on Mary. He portrayed the Mother of God "as devoid off any defect or imperfection, radiant with exceptional greatness and holiness."

In 390 he defended the doctrine of the perpetual virginity of Mary, rejected by Jovinian. He also disputed the teaching of Bonosus of Sardica that Mary had other children after Jesus, citing John 19: 25-26 and arguing that if that were so, Jesus would not have entrusted his mother to John. He addressed this further in De Institutione Virginis.

=== Augustine of Hippo ===
The cultus of Mary was not as strong in North Africa during the time of Augustine (354–430) as compared with that of recent martyrs. Augustine died the year before the Council of Ephesus in 431 declared Mary to be the Mother of God, which prompted a more in-depth consideration of Mary's role. He did not develop an independent Mariology, but his statements on Mary surpass in number and depth those of other early writers. His main themes are discussed in De santa virginitate (“On holy virginity”), where he explains that, like the church, Mary is both virgin and mother, both physically and spiritually.

Augustine said that Mary was more blessed in accepting faith in Christ than in conceiving the flesh of Christ. Augustine's interest in Mary's maternity was Christ-centred and underscored both the full humanity and full divinity of Christ.

=== Cyril of Alexandria ===
Cyril of Alexandria (412–444) presided over the Third Ecumenical Council held in 431 at Ephesus which defined it as an article of faith that Mary was truly the Mother of God. This arose from an apparent Christological dispute pitting Cyril against Nestorius of Constantinople.

Veneration of Mary as “Theotokos” (God bearer) supported the doctrine of the incarnation, and Christ's status as equal to the God the Father. Cyril believed that Nestorius' preference for the term “Christotokos” (Christ-bearer) undermined this and suggested that Christ was distinct persons: one fully human and born of Mary, the other fully divine and not subject to birth or death. The Council endorsed the name "Theotokos", which in the West is translated as Mother of God.

== Saints of the Middle Ages ==
=== Bernard of Clairvaux ===
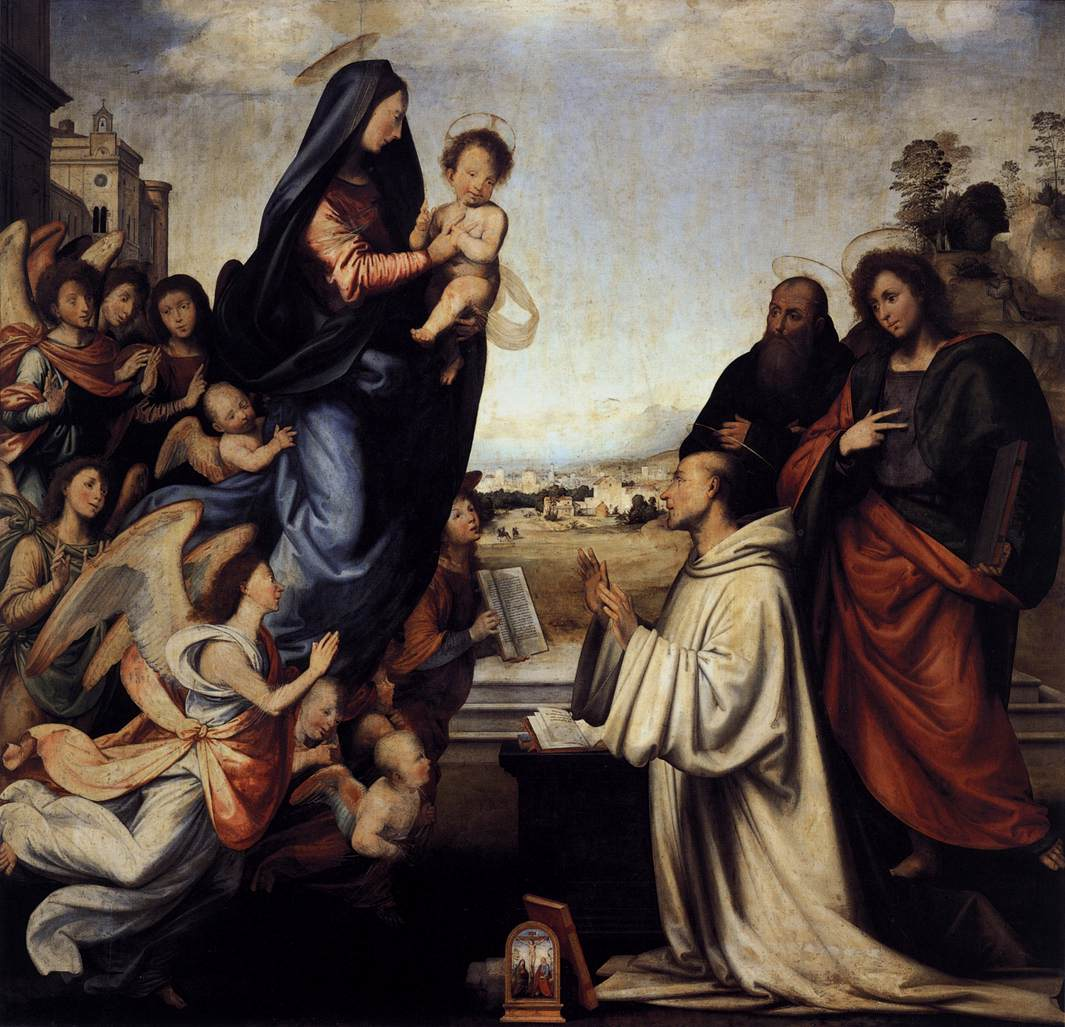
The Vision of St Bernard, by Fra Bartolommeo, c. 1504 (Uffizi).

Bernard of Clairvaux was one of the influential churchmen of his time. In the "Sermon on the Sunday in the Octave of the Assumption" he described Mary's participation in redemption. Bernard's Praises on the Virgin Mother" was a small but complete treatise on Mariology.

Bernard wrote of Mary under the title "Our Lady, Star of the Sea".

When the storms of temptation burst upon you, when you see yourself driven upon the rocks of tribulation, look at the star, call upon Mary. When swallowed by pride or ambition, or hatred, or jealousy, look at the star, call upon Mary. Should anger, or avarice, or fleshly desire violently assail the frail vessel of your soul, look at the star, call upon Mary. If troubled on account of the heinousness of your sins, distressed at the filthy state of your conscience, and terrified at the thought of the awful judgment to come, you are beginning to sink into the bottomless gulf of sadness and to be swallowed in the abyss of despair, then think of Mary. In dangers, in doubts, in difficulties, think of Mary, call upon Mary. Let not her name leave thy lips, never suffer it to leave your heart.

In 1953, on the eighth centenary of Bernard's death, Pope Pius XII issued the encyclical Doctor Mellifluus on St. Bernard of Clairvaux.

=== Hildegard of Bingen ===
Hildegard of Bingen "presents the most complex Mariology of Medieval German women writers." While following the traditional juxtaposition of Eve and Mary, Adam is depicted in the illustrated Scivias as listening to the tempter, and thus bears equal blame. Of the sixty-three songs in Hildegard's Symphonia, sixteen focus on the role of Mary in salvation history, the most dedicated to any one figure. In Hildegard's Mariology, Mary assumes the status of an essential, active partner in the plan of redemption. A second characteristic Marian theme is that of the Virgin Mother healing the brokenness brought into the world by the first mother, Eve. Hildegard belongs more to the Romanesque than the Gothic Age. Untouched by a new affective style of piety that friars will popularize across Europe, Hildegard's Mary, like her overall spirituality, is monastic.

=== Saint Dominic ===
A popular legend holds that Dominic received the Rosary from Mary. Although widely believed to have made use of the Rosary in working for the conversion of the Albigensians, the canonization Acts of Saint Dominic emphasize his frequent praying of the plainsong hymn Ave Maris Stella. The Rosary remains a unique part of the charism of the Order of Preachers.

=== Anthony of Padua ===
The many sermons of Anthony of Padua (1195–1231) on the Virgin Mary reflect his belief in various Marian doctrines that were declared as dogmas centuries after his death. He reflected on the Assumption of Mary and referring to Psalm 132 argued that, just as Jesus had risen up to Heaven, so did Mary. He also supported Mary's freedom from sin and her Immaculate Conception. Given that Anthony was one of the best educated and articulate of the early Franciscans, he was treated as a Doctor of the Church by his order, even before the title was granted to him in 1946.

As a Doctor of the Church the views of Anthony of Padua shaped the Mariological approach of a large number of Franciscans who followed his approach for centuries after his death.

=== Catherine of Siena ===
Catherine of Siena, a third order Dominican, began almost all of her more than 300 letters with, "In the name of Jesus Christ crucified and of gentle Mary”. For Catherine, the Incarnation is the beginning of the redemption. The city of Siena was dedicated to Mary in 1260, and Catherine absorbed its ambient spirituality. She adopted the custom of dedicating Saturday to Mary and recommended praying the Little Office of the Blessed Virgin Mary.

Her writings influenced theologian Charles Journet.

== Reformation ==
=== Petrus Canisius ===
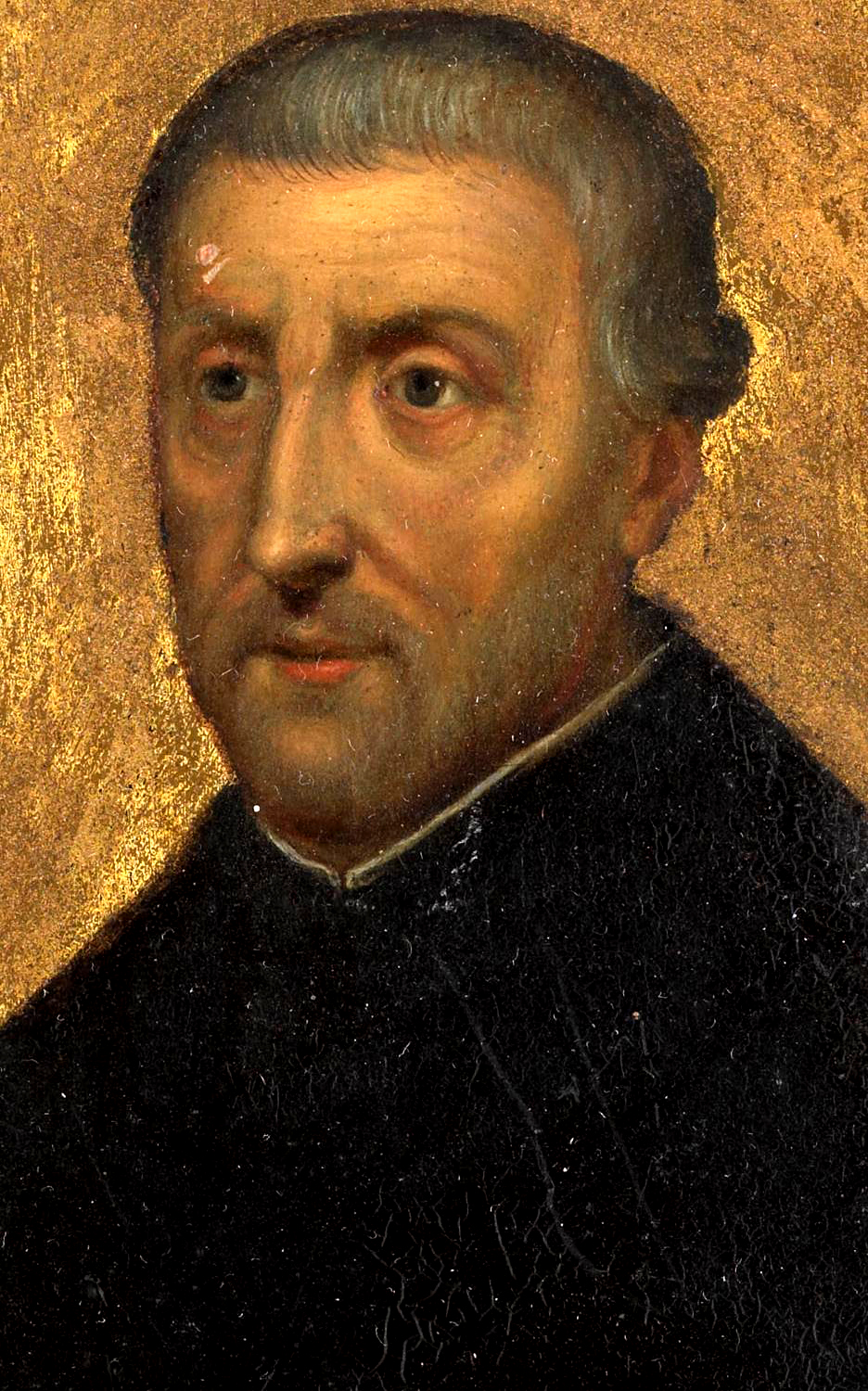
Saint Petrus Canisius contributed to the Hail Mary prayer.

Saint Petrus Canisius (1521–1597), of the Society of Jesus, taught that while there are many roads leading to Jesus Christ, Marian veneration is the best. Canisius tried to show a practical rationale for Marian devotion and defended it against opposing Protestant arguments. His lasting contribution to this "applied mariology" are his three catechisms, which he published in Latin and German, and which became widespread and popular in Catholic regions. Under the heading "prayer" he explains the Ave Maria, (Hail Mary), as the basis for Catholic Marian piety. Less known are his Marian books, in which he published prayers and contemplative texts.

He is credited with adding to the Hail Mary the sentence Holy Mary, Mother of God, pray for us sinners. This sentence appeared for the first time in his catechism of 1555. It was eleven years later included in the Catechism of the Council of Trent of 1566.

"Petrus Canisius provided a classical defence of the whole Catholic mariology against Protestantism", as judged three hundred years later by a leading Catholic theologian.

=== Robert Bellarmine ===
While the Jesuit Cardinal Robert Bellarmine daily prayed the Rosary and the Little Office, he also had a particular devotion to the Immaculate Conception. Pope Pius XII quotes Bellarmine in the 1950 apostolic constitution Munificentissimus Deus promulgating the dogma of the Assumption.

=== Francis de Sales ===
Francis de Sales was about twelve years old when he was to Paris to be educated at the Jesuit Collège de Clermont, where he joined the Sodality of Mary. The doctrine of the Immaculate Conception, although still at that time debated, was an important element of Jesuit Marian devotion. In 1584 a personal religious crisis led him to the chapel of Notre Dame de Bonne Deliverance at the Dominican church of St. Etienne des Gres, where he dedicated himself to the Blessed Virgin.

As provost to the Bishop of Geneva, de Sales undertook missionary work in the Calvinist Chablais, recently annexed to Catholic Savoy. Promoting the cult of Mary was part of his evangelizing efforts. As bishop, he erected churches and chapels dedicated to Notre Dame. Many of these were consecrated in honor of the Immaculate Conception and the Assumption, thus giving prominence to these doctrines.

In Introduction to the Devout Life, de Sales' recommended devotion to Mary, especially entrusting oneself to her maternal heart. In The Treatise on the Love of God, he follows Duns Scotus in maintaining that being preordained to be the Mother of God, Mary was, by a singular privilege, preserved from original sin at the moment of her conception. This was done through the prevenient application of Christ's merits to her and thus a preservative redemption. "For him, the reciprocal love of God and humankind is paradigmatically discovered in the union of the hearts of Mary and Jesus."

== Modern era ==
=== Jean Eudes ===
Jean Eudes (1601–1680) was influenced in part by the writings of Saint Francis de Sales on the perfections of the Heart of Mary as the model of love for God. He introduced the devotion to the Hearts of Jesus and Mary and established the Society of the Heart of the Mother Most Admirable. Eudes began his devotional teachings with the Heart of Mary, and then extended it to the Sacred Heart of Jesus.

The feast of the Holy Heart of Mary was celebrated for the first time in 1648, and that of the Sacred Heart of Jesus in 1670. The Mass and Office proper to these feasts were composed by Saint Jean Eudes in 1668.

=== Louis de Montfort ===
Louis de Montfort (1673–1716) was defender of Mariology against Jansenism; his True Devotion to Mary synthesized many of the writings of earlier saints. Montfort's approach of "total consecration to Jesus Christ through Mary" had a strong impact on Marian devotion both in popular piety and in the spirituality of religious institutes. Pope John Paul II quoted Montfort in his Apostolic Letter Rosarium Virginis Mariae: Since Mary is of all creatures the one most conformed to Jesus Christ, it follows that among all devotions that which most consecrates and conforms a soul to our Lord is devotion to Mary, his Holy Mother, and that the more a soul is consecrated to her the more will it be consecrated to Jesus Christ."

Montfort's The Secret of the Rosary is also widely read.

=== Alphonsus Liguori ===
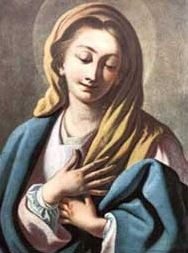
Madonna painted by St. Alphonsus Liguori, c. 1718

Mainly pastoral in nature, the Mariology of Alphonsus Liguori rediscovers, integrates and defends the Mariology of Augustine and Ambrose and other fathers and represents an intellectual defence of Mariology in the eighteenth century. Liguori promoted the doctrine of the bodily Assumption of Mary into Heaven, arguing that Jesus would not have wanted his mother's body corrupted in flesh, for that would have been a dishonour, given that he had himself been born of the Virgin, and hence Mary must have been assumed into Heaven.

In The Glories of Mary, Liguori based his analysis of Mary as the "Gate to Heaven" on Saint Bernard's statement: “No one can enter Heaven unless by Mary, as though through a door.” He also wrote Hail Holy Queen: An Explanation of the Salve Regina.

=== Thérèse of Lisieux ===
It is said that for Thérèse of Lisieux "...it was more important for people to imitate Mary than to admire her. She was outspokenly impatient with sermons that exaggerated the Blessed Virgin's privileges – as though Mary did not walk in the darkness that shrouds all true faith." Speaking of Mary, Thérèse said,"She is more Mother than Queen."

=== Maximillian Kolbe ===
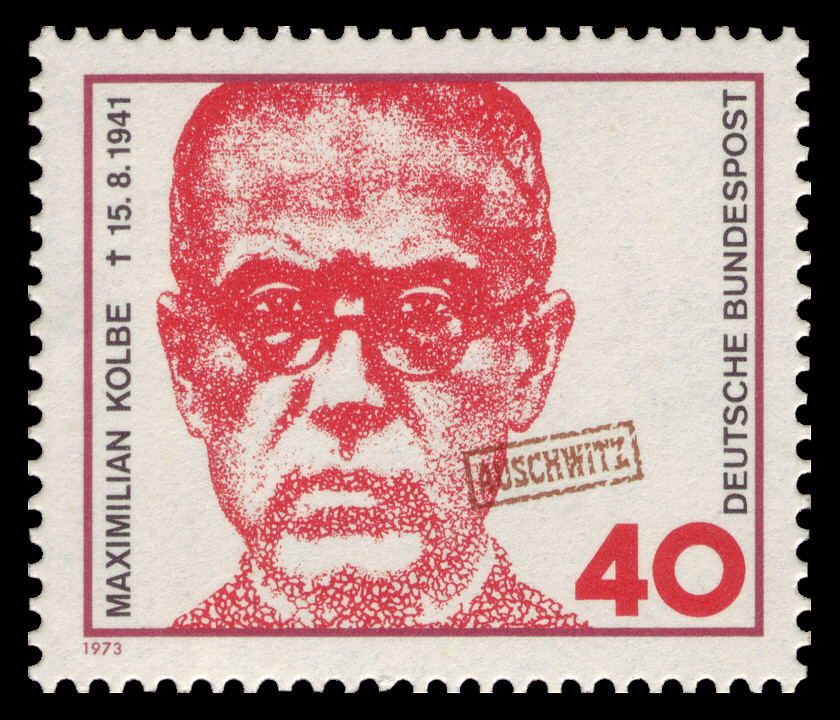
Saint Maximilian Kolbe

In 1915, while still in the seminary, Saint Maximillian Kolbe (1894–1941) and six other students started the movement Militia Immaculatae to promote devotion to the Immaculate Conception, partly relying on the 1858 messages of Our Lady of Lourdes. Kolbe emphasized the renewal of the baptismal promises by making a total consecration to the Immaculata, which he considered the most perfect means of achieving unity with Jesus. Kolbe later founded the monastery of Immaculate City and founded the publication Militia Immaculatae (Knight of the Immaculate). Kolbe's efforts in promoting consecration to the Immaculata made him known as the "Apostle of Consecration to Mary".

== See also ==
- Roman Catholic Mariology
- History of Roman Catholic Mariology
- Mariology of the popes
- Marian devotions
