= Catholic Mariology =

Study of Mary in Catholic theology

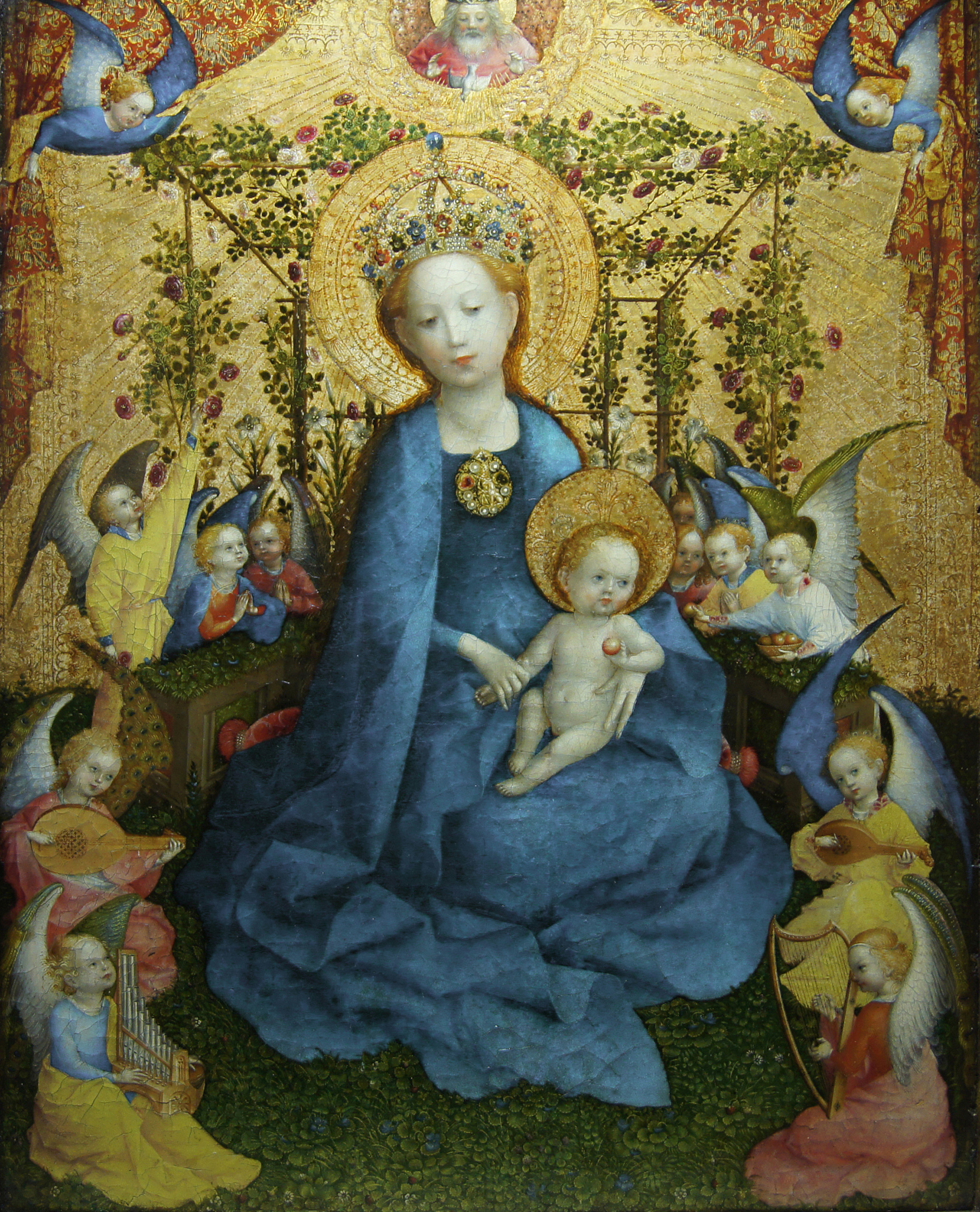
The Blessed Virgin Mary is depicted in a rose garden with angels playing music. Roses are a symbol of Mary.

Catholic Mariology is the systematic study of the person of Mary, the mother of Jesus, and of her place in the economy of salvation in Catholic theology. According to the doctrine of the Immaculate Conception taught by the Catholic Church, Mary was conceived and born without original sin, hence she is seen as having a singular dignity above the saints, receiving a higher level of veneration than all angelic spirits and blessed souls in heaven. Catholic Mariology thus studies not only her life but also the veneration of her in daily life, prayer, hymns, art, music, and architecture in modern and ancient Christianity throughout the ages.

The basis of Mariology are the four Marian dogmas: Mary being the Mother of God, her Immaculate Conception, her perpetual virginity, and her assumption into Heaven. However, a number of other Catholic doctrines about the Virgin Mary have been developed by reference to Sacred Scripture, theological reasoning and church tradition. The development of Mariology is ongoing and since the beginnings it has continued to be shaped by theological analyses, writings of saints, and papal statements, e.g. while all four of the dogmas are ancient in their origin, two were not defined until the 19th and 20th centuries; and papal teachings on Mary have continued to appear in recent times.

In parallel to the traditional views, since the late 19th century, as Marian devotion became more pronounced in the Catholic Church, a number of other perspectives have been presented as a challenge to Catholic Mariology. Some other Christian views see Catholic Mariology as unbiblical and a denial of the uniqueness of Christ as redeemer and mediator, and some modern psychological interpretations see Mary as similar to polytheistic goddesses ranging from Diana to Guan Yin. Nonetheless, Christians in the Catholic Church, the Old Catholic churches, the Eastern Orthodox Church, the Oriental Orthodox Churches, the Assyrian Church of the East, the Ancient Church of the East, the Independent Sacramental Movement, Anglo-Catholicism, and other High church Protestants continue to revere Mary as the greatest saint.

== Study of Mary and her place in the Catholic Church ==
=== Context and components ===
The study of Mary and her place in the Catholic Church has been undertaken from a number of perspectives and within a number of contexts, and in his address to the 2012 Mariological congress, Pope Benedict XVI stated that this study must be "understood and deeply examined from different and complementary viewpoints". Benedict also emphasized that the study of Mary cannot be performed in isolation from other disciplines and that Mariology is inherently related to the study of Christ and of the church, and expresses the inner coherence of these disciplines.

Pope Benedict XVI has stated that Marian studies have three separate characteristics: first personalizing the church so it is not seen just as a structure but as a person, secondly the incarnational aspect and the relation to God, and third Marian piety which involves the heart and the emotional component.

Mary's position in the church can be compared to the aspect of the Petrine office in a dual sense. This perspective on the duality of the roles of Mary and Peter highlights the subjective holiness of the heart and the holiness of the structure of the church. In this duality, the Petrine office logically examines the charisms for their theological soundness, while the Marian dual provides a balance in the spiritual and emotional sense via the service of love that the office can never encompass. Mariology and the doctrine of office are thus not "side chapels" in Catholic teachings, but are central and integrating elements of it. As referenced in Pope Pius XII's 1943 the encyclical Mystici Corporis Christi, her fiat gave consent for a spiritual marriage between the Son of God and human nature, thus giving humanity the means to salvation. Mary's rights (wedding feast at Cana), and Mary's love (fiat) are essential to salvation.

=== Maximalism and minimalism ===
Mariology is a field in which deeply felt pious beliefs of the faithful and hagiography may conflict with theological and critical historical reviews of beliefs and practices. This conflict was recognized as early as the year 1300 by William of Ware who described the tendency of some believers to attribute almost everything to Mary. Bonaventura warned against Marian maximalism: "One has to be careful as to not to minimize the honour of our Lord, Jesus Christ." Both minimalist and maximalist have always seen in Mary a sign of the Catholic Church and viewed her as a model for all Catholics.

In the 20th century, Pope Pius XII, "the most Marian pope in Church history", warned against both exuberant exaggerations and timid minimalism in the presentation of Mary. The Vatican II dogmatic constitution Lumen gentium was specifically written in 1964 to avoid both Marian maximalism and minimalism. Pope John Paul II was also careful to avoid both maximalism and minimalism in his Mariology and avoided taking personal positions on issues which were subject to theological debate.

== Mariology and Christology ==
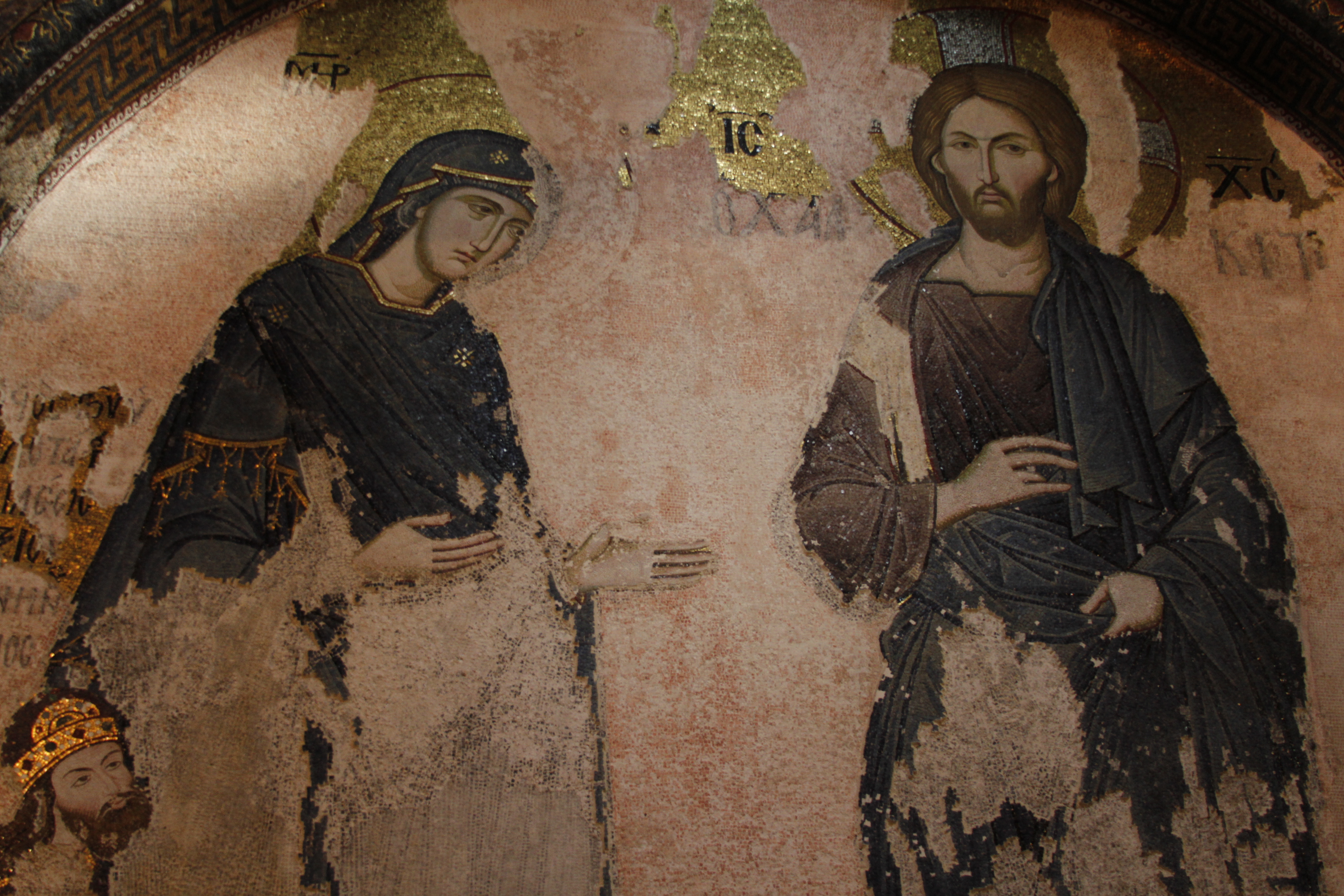
Christ and Mary, mosaic, Chora Church, 12–14th century

Mariology is related to Christology (the study of Christ) and in the Catholic theological and papal writings has been viewed as interwoven with the mystery of Christ. Pope John Paul II discussed the "precise place of Mary" in the plan of salvation in the encyclical Redemptoris Mater and stated: "Following the line of the Second Vatican Council, I wish to emphasize the special presence of the Mother of God in the mystery of Christ and his Church. For this is a fundamental dimension emerging from the Mariology of the Council".

Catholic theologians have also explored the necessary connection of Mariology with Christology. According to John Henry Newman: "Mariology is always christocentric". Pope Benedict XVI characterized the relationship by stating that "Christology and Mariology are inseparably interwoven" from their very beginnings. In his view, Mariology underscores the nexus of the mysteries of Christology and ecclesiology, and reflects they are intrinsically interwoven.

Early Christians and numerous saints focused on this connection and popes highlighted the inner link between Marian doctrines and a fuller understanding of Christological themes. Given the Catholic perspective that the church lives in its relation to Christ, being the Body of Christ, it also has a relation to his mother, whose study is the subject of Catholic Mariology. Pope Pius X in Ad diem illum stated: "there is no more direct road than by Mary for uniting all mankind in Christ."

In Catholic theology the study of Mary, while contributing to the study of Christ, is also a separate discipline in its own right, with an understanding of the figure of Mary contributing to a fuller understanding of who Christ is and what he did. The Congregation for Catholic Education has characterized the situation as follows: "The history of theology shows that an understanding of the mystery of the Virgin contributes to a more profound understanding of the mystery of Christ, of the Church and of the vocation of man." Referring to this, Cardinal Raymond Leo Burke stated that the promotion of a fuller knowledge of the Virgin Mary is the "constant work of the Church".

== History and development ==
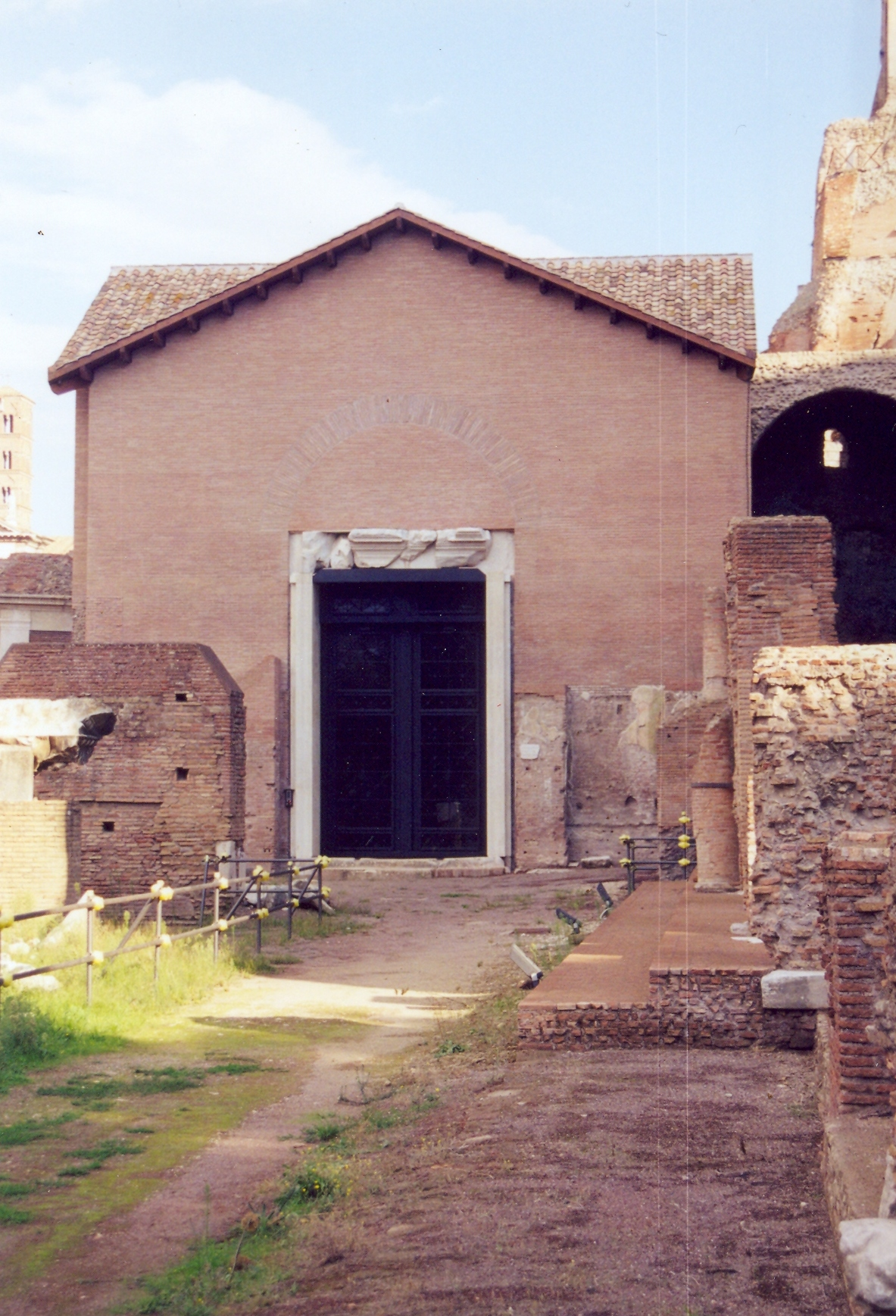
Santa Maria Antiqua, in the Forum Romanum, 5th century, seat of Pope John VII

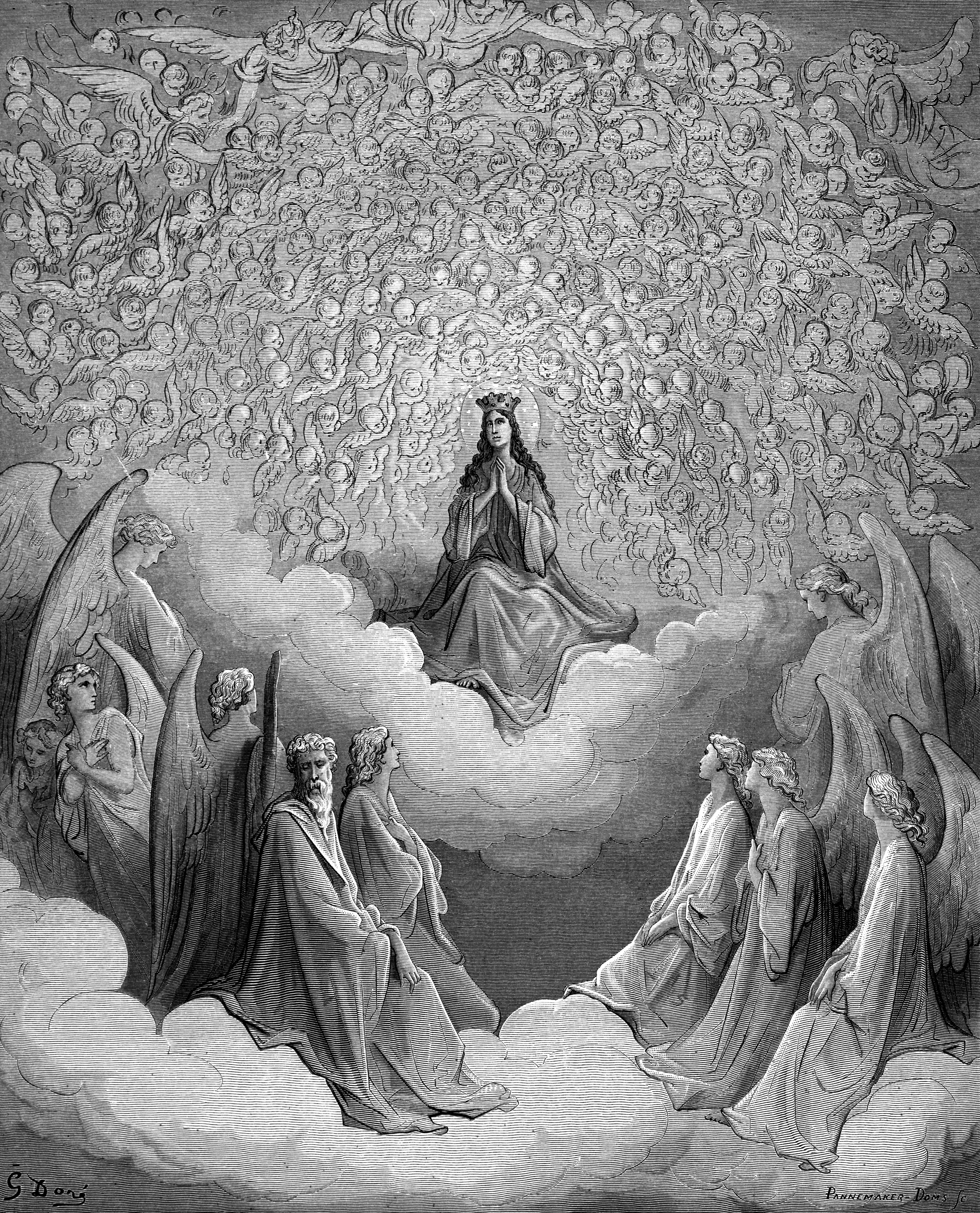
Mary as the Queen of Heaven in Dante's Divine Comedy. Illustration by Gustave Doré.

Early Christians focused their piety at first more upon the martyrs; but following that, they saw in Mary a bridge between the old and the new. The earliest recorded prayer to Mary, the Sub tuum praesidium, is dated to around the year 250.

In Egypt the veneration of Mary had started in the 3rd century and the term Theotokos was used by Church Father Origen.

The Renaissance period witnessed a dramatic growth in Marian art. Masterpieces by Botticelli, Leonardo da Vinci and Raphael were produced in this period. In the 16th century, the Council of Trent confirmed the Catholic tradition of paintings and artworks in churches, resulting in a great development of Marian art and Mariology during the Baroque Period. During the Reformation, the Catholic Church defended its Mariology against Protestant views. With the victory at Battle of Lepanto (1571) accredited to her, it "signified the beginning of a strong resurgence of Marian devotions." The baroque literature on Mary experienced unforeseen growth. More than 500 pages of Mariological writings were published during the 17th century alone.

Popes have fostered the veneration of the Blessed Virgin through the promotion of Marian devotions, feast days, prayers, initiatives, the acceptance and support of Marian congregations, and, the formal recognition of Marian apparitions such as in Lourdes and Fátima. Popes Alexander VII and Clement X both promulgated the veneration of the Sacred Heart of Jesus and the Immaculate Heart of Mary, a concept which was embraced by Pope John Paul II in the 20th century as the Alliance of the Hearts of Jesus and Mary.

The two Marian dogmas of Immaculate Conception and Assumption were established by popes in the 19th and 20th century. Pope Pius XII issued the Dogma of the Assumption and the Second Vatican Council declared Mary to be the Mother of the Church. In his 2002 Apostolic Letter Rosarium Virginis Mariæ, Pope John Paul II emphasized Louis de Montfort's approach of viewing the study of Mary as a path to gaining a better understanding of the mystery of Christ. This is consistent with the emphasis of the bishops at the Second Vatican Council in not having a separate decree on Mary but rather describing her place in salvation history in Lumen gentium, the constitution on the church.

== Dogmatic teachings ==
Marian Catholic dogmas present Catholic teachings about Mary and her relation to Jesus Christ, held by the church to be infallible, and reflect the role of Mary in the economy of salvation.

De Fide Definita or De Fide Credenda doctrines have the highest degree of dogmatic certainty. These doctrines come in several forms, namely the sacred scriptures and apostolic tradition and teachings which have been specifically defined as revealed by an extraordinary definition by a pope or ecumenical council (extraordinary universal Magisterium), or those teachings infallibly taught to be revealed by the ordinary universal Magisterium. As in the case of the Immaculate Conception or the Assumption, these doctrines were held by the church prior to the date of official definition, but open for discussion. From the date of definition, they must be accepted by all members of the Catholic Church as contained specifically in the Deposit of Faith and owed supernatural faith in itself (de fide credenda).

There are four Marian dogmas specifically defined by the Magisterium among a large number of other dogmas and doctrines about the Virgin Mary – for example, the Annunciation of Mary is dogma because it is in the scriptures, but it has not been formally defined by the Magisterium. These four Marian dogmas include:

Name	First magisterial definition	Substance of the dogma
Mother of God	Council of Ephesus (431)	Mother of God, not that the nature of the Word or his divinity received the beginning of its existence from the holy Virgin, but that, since the holy body, animated by a rational soul, which the Word of God united to himself according to the hypostasis, was born from her, the Word is said to be born according to the flesh.
Perpetual virginity	Second Council of Constantinople (553) and Lateran Synod (649)	'Perpetual virginity of Mary', means that Mary was a virgin before, during and after giving birth.
Immaculate Conception	Pope Pius IX (1854)	Mary, at her conception, was preserved immaculate from Original Sin.
Assumption into heaven	Pope Pius XII (1950)	Mary, having completed the course of her earthly life, was assumed body and soul into heavenly glory.

=== Mother of God ===
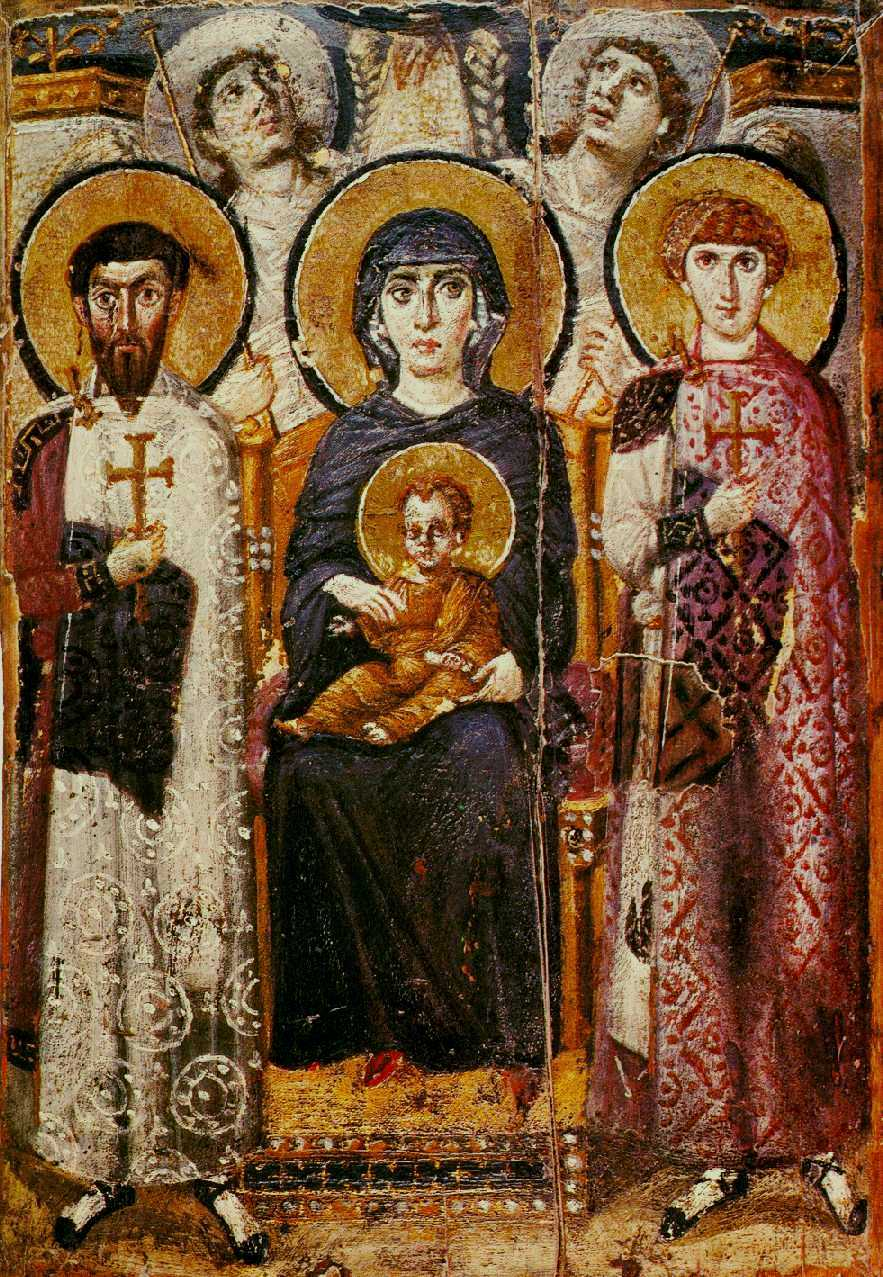
Virgin and Child with angels and Sts. George and Theodore from Saint Catherine's Monastery, c. 600

Mary's motherhood of God (Deipara in Latin) is a dogma of the Catholic Church. The term "Mother of God" appears within the oldest known prayer to Mary, the Sub tuum praesidium, which dates to around 250 AD: "Under thy protection we seek refuge, Holy Mother of God". This was the first specifically Marian doctrine to be formally defined by the church, formally affirmed at the Third Ecumenical Council held at Ephesus in 431. This refuted the objection raised by Patriarch Nestorius of Constantinople.

Scriptural basis for the dogma is found in John 1:14 which states "And the Word became flesh, and dwelt among us" and in Galatians 4:4 which states "God sent forth his Son, born of a woman, born under the law". Luke 1:35 further affirms divine maternity by stating: "The holy Spirit will come upon you. ... Therefore, the child to be born will be called holy, the Son of God."

The dogmatic constitution Lumen gentium at the Second Vatican Council affirmed Mary as the Mother of God. "The Virgin Mary, who at the message of the angel received the Word of God in her heart and in her body and gave Life to the world, is acknowledged and honored as being truly the Mother of God and Mother of the Redeemer."

This dogma is inherently related to the Christological dogma of the hypostatic union which relates the divine and human natures of Jesus Christ. The Catechism of the Catholic Church teaches that "Mary is truly 'Mother of God' since she is the mother of the eternal Son of God made man, who is God himself." According to Catholic teaching, sourced in the John 1:1–14, Mary did not create the divine person of Jesus, who existed with the Father from all eternity.

=== Assumption of Mary ===
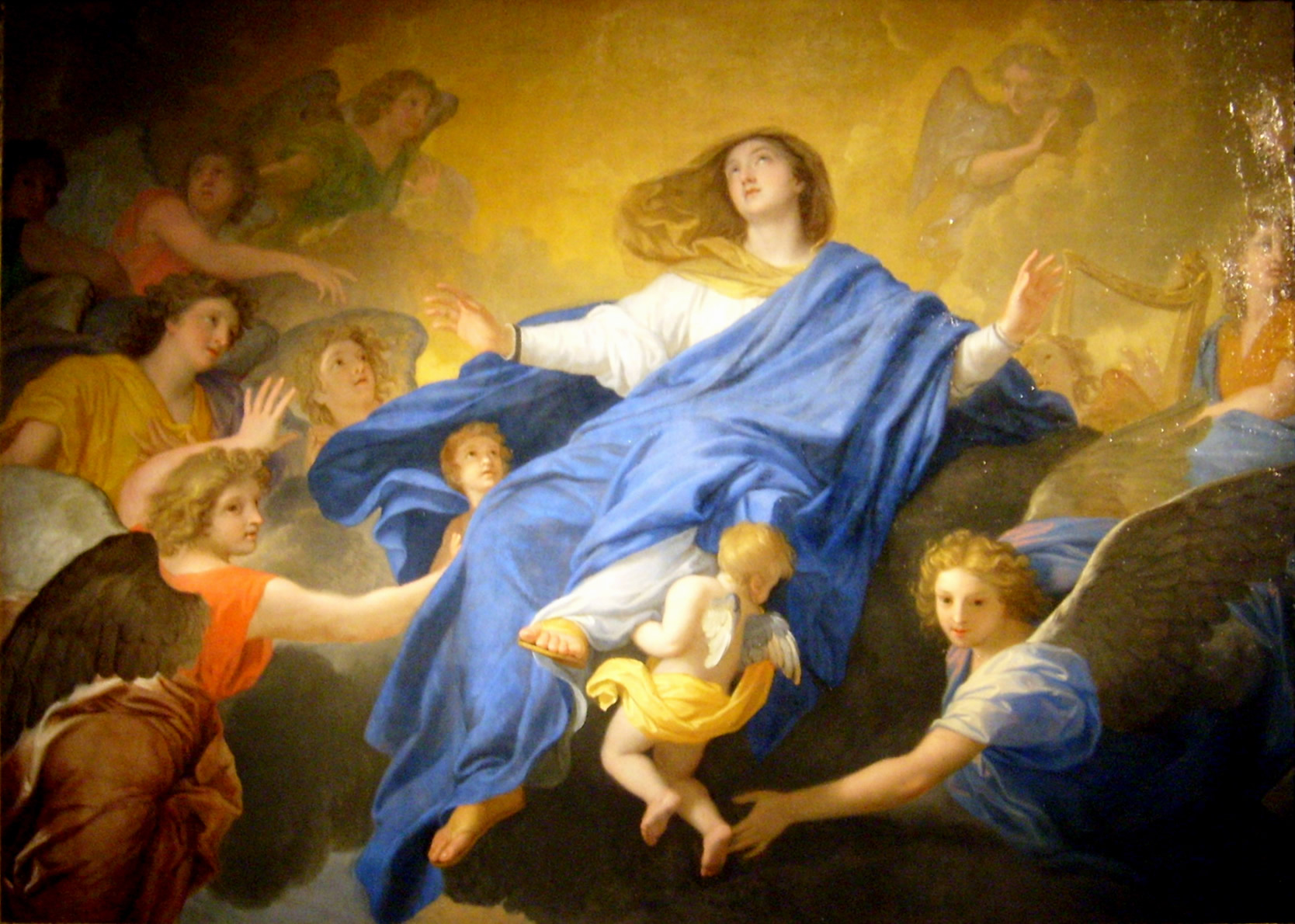
The Assumption of Mary by Charles Le Brun, 1835

This dogma states that Mary was assumed into heaven with body and soul. The Catechism (item 966) states:

The Immaculate Virgin, preserved free from all stain of original sin, when the course of her earthly life was finished, was taken up body and soul into heavenly glory, and exalted by the Lord as Queen over all things.

Pope Pius XII discussed the Assumption in Deiparae Virginis Mariae (1946) and declared it a dogma in Munificentissimus Deus (1950).

Although the Assumption was only recently defined as dogma, accounts of the bodily assumption of Mary into heaven have circulated since at least the 5th century, and by the 8th century Andrew of Crete and John of Damascus had declared belief in it. The Book of Revelation (12:1) has been interpreted as referring to it; with her coronation implying her previous bodily assumption to heaven.

Before declaring the Assumption a dogma in Munificentissimus Deus in 1950, in the encyclical Deiparae Virginis Mariae (1946) Pope Pius XII obtained the opinion of Catholic bishops, and based on their overwhelming support (1210 among the 1232 bishops) proceeded with the dogmatic definition. The consensus of Magisterial teaching and liturgy affirms that Mary suffered death before her assumption, but this is not always accepted as settled doctrine. What is most clear is that her body was not left on earth to corrupt.

When responding to Pope Pius XII following the circulation of Deiparae Virginis Mariae, a large number of Catholic bishops pointed to the Book of Genesis (3:15) as a scriptural basis. In Munificentissimus Deus (item 39) Pius XII referred to the "struggle against the infernal foe" as in Genesis 3:15 and to "complete victory over the sin and death" as in the Letters of Paul as a scriptural basis for the dogmatic definition, Mary being assumed into heaven also seems to verify 1 Corinthians 15:54: "Then shall come to pass the saying that is written, Death is swallowed up in victory".

=== Immaculate Conception of Mary ===
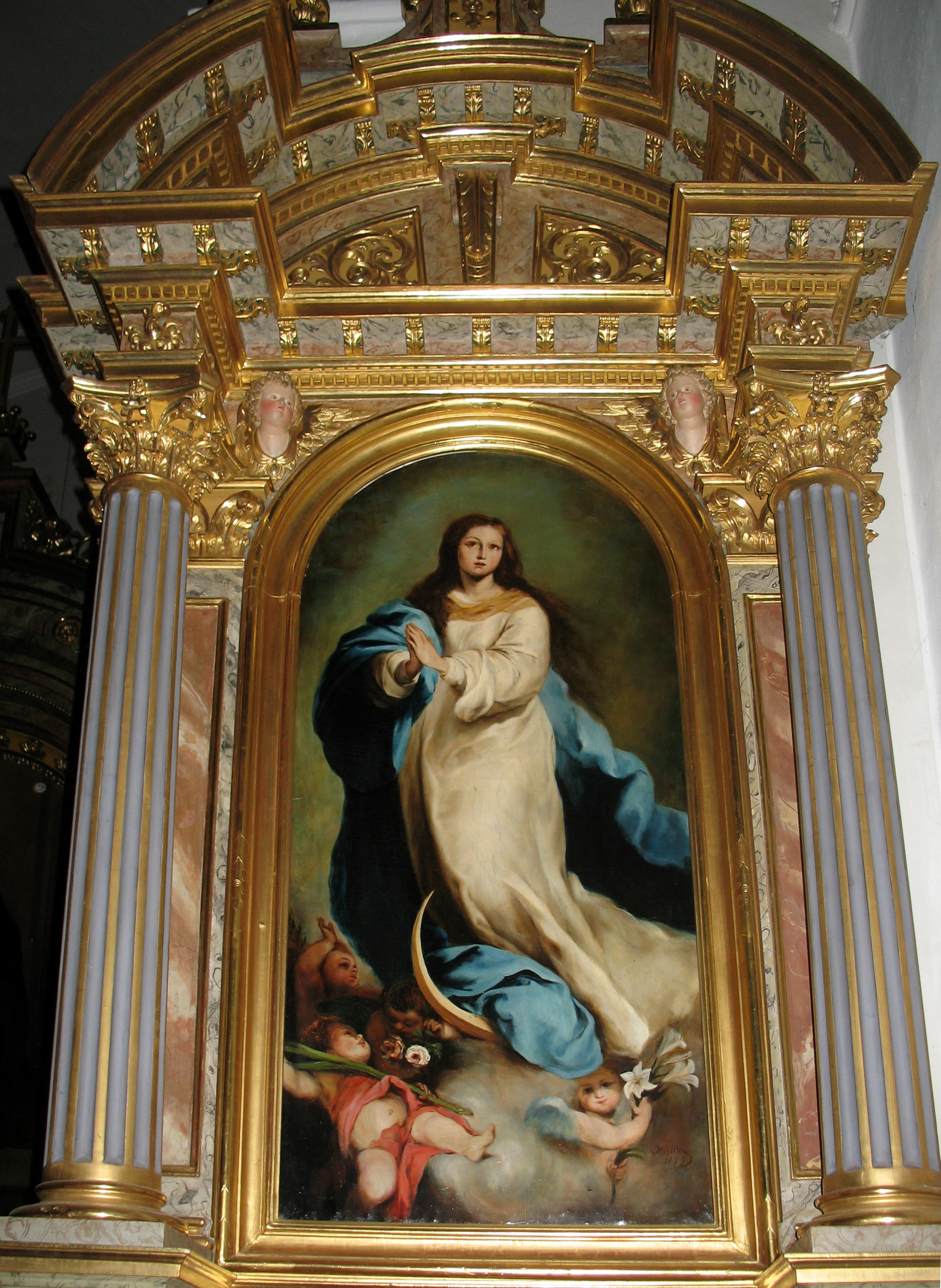
Altar of the Immaculata by Joseph Lusenberg, 1876. Saint Antony's Church, Urtijëi, Italy.

This dogma states that Mary was conceived without original sin. This means that from the first moment of her existence she was preserved by God from the lack of sanctifying grace, and that she was instead filled with divine grace.

The dogma of the Immaculate Conception is distinct from and should not be confused with the perpetual virginity of Mary or the virgin birth of Jesus; for this dogma refers to the conception of Mary by her mother, Saint Anne, and not the conception of Jesus.

The feast of the Immaculate Conception, celebrated on December 8, was established in 1476 by Pope Sixtus IV, but the dogmatic definition came from Pope Pius IX in his constitution Ineffabilis Deus, on December 8, 1854.

The dogma states that Mary possessed sanctifying grace from the first instant of her existence and by a special and unique gift of God was free from the lack of grace caused by the original sin from the beginning of human history. In Fulgens corona (item 10) Pope Pius XII reaffirmed the concept by stating: "Who will dare to doubt that she, who was purer than the angels and at all times pure, was at any moment, even for the briefest instant, not free from every stain of sin?"

Ineffabilis Deus (as well as Pope Pius XII's Munificentissimus Deus on the Assumption) also teaches the predestination of Mary, in that she was preserved from sin due to the role reserved for her in the economy of salvation. This predetermination of Mary's role in salvation was referred to in Lumen gentium (item 61) which stated that she was "Predestined from eternity by that decree of divine providence which determined the incarnation of the Word to be the Mother of God." The definition in Ineffabilis Deus confirms the uniqueness of the Immaculate Conception as a gift from God to Mary, that Jesus might receive his body from one unstained by sin.

=== Perpetual virginity of Mary ===
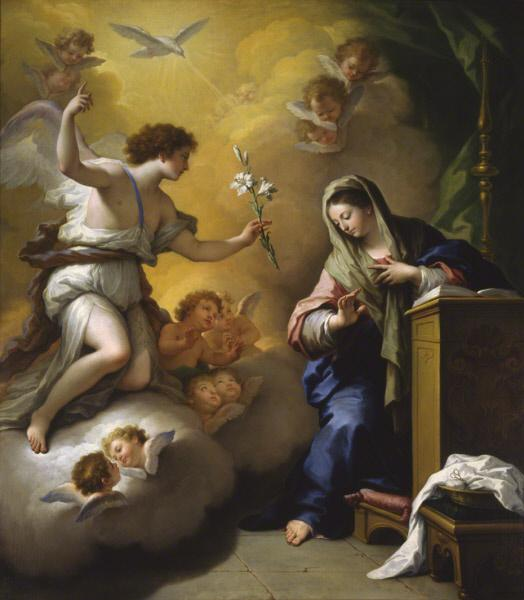
The Annunciation by Paolo de Matteis, 1712

This dogma states that Mary was a virgin before, during and after giving birth (de fide). This oldest Marian doctrine, (also held by Lutheran, Eastern Orthodox, and Oriental Orthodox, and many other Christians) affirms Mary's "real and perpetual virginity even in the act of giving birth to the Son of God made Man." Thus, by the teaching of this dogma, the faithful believe that Mary was ever-Virgin (Greek ἀειπάρθενος) for the whole of her life, making Jesus her only biological son, whose conception and birth are held to be miraculous.

The doctrine of perpetual virginity is distinct from the dogma of the Immaculate Conception of Mary, which relates to the conception of the Virgin Mary herself without any stain (macula in Latin) of original sin.

Virginity before birth

This means that Mary conceived by the Holy Spirit without participation of any man (de fide). The Greek term Aeiparthenos (i.e. "Ever Virgin") is attested to from the early 4th century. The Catechism of the Catholic Church (item 499) includes the term Aeiparthenos and referring to the dogmatic constitution Lumen gentium (item 57) states: "Christ's birth did not diminish his mother's virginal integrity but sanctified it."

Virginity during birth

This means that Mary gave birth without losing her corporal virginity (de fide) and her corporal integrity was not affected by giving birth. The Catholic Church does not teach how this occurred physically, but insists that virginity during child birth is different from virginity of conception.

Virginity after birth

This means that Mary remained a virgin after giving birth (de fide). This belief of the church was questioned in its early years. The scriptures say little about this, mentioning the brothers of Jesus, but never "sons of Mary", suggesting to the patristic writers a broader family relationship.

== Other Marian doctrines ==
Apart from the four Marian dogmas listed above, the Catholic Church holds a number of other doctrines about the Virgin Mary which have been developed by references to Sacred Scripture, theological reasoning and church tradition.

=== Queen of Heaven ===
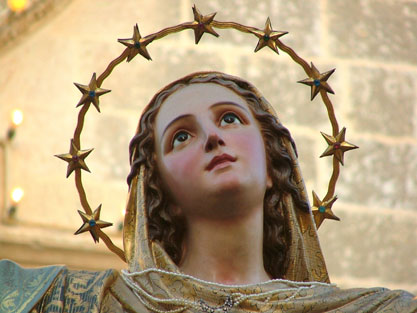
Statue (detail) of the Assumption of Mary in Attard, Malta

The doctrine that the Virgin Mary has been crowned Queen of Heaven goes back to certain early patristic writers of the church such as Gregory Nazianzen's "the Mother of the King of the universe", and the "Virgin Mother who brought forth the King of the whole world", Prudentius's the Mother marvels "that she has brought forth God as man, and even as Supreme King." and, Ephrem's, "Let Heaven sustain me in its embrace, because I am honored above it. For heaven was not Thy mother, but Thou hast made it Thy throne. How much more honorable and venerable than the throne of a king is her mother." The Catholic Church often sees Mary as queen in heaven, bearing a crown of twelve stars in Revelation.

Many popes have given tribute to Mary in this regard, for example: Mary is the Queen of Heaven and Earth, (Pius IX), Queen and Ruler of the Universe (Leo XIII) and Queen of the World (Pius XII) The theological and logical foundation of these titles rests in the dogma of Mary as the Mother of God. As mother of God, she participates in his salvation plan. The Catholic faith teaches that Mary, the Virgin Mother of God, reigns with a mother's solicitude over the entire world, just as she is crowned in heavenly blessedness with the glory of a Queen, as Pius XII wrote:

Certainly, in the full and strict meaning of the term, only Jesus Christ, the God-Man, is King; but Mary, too, as Mother of the divine Christ, as His associate in the redemption, in his struggle with His enemies and His final victory over them, has a share, though in a limited and analogous way, in His royal dignity. For from her union with Christ she attains a radiant eminence transcending that of any other creature; from her union with Christ she receives the royal right to dispose of the treasures of the Divine Redeemer's Kingdom; from her union with Christ finally is derived the inexhaustible efficacy of her maternal intercession before the Son and His Father.

=== Mary as Mother of the Church ===
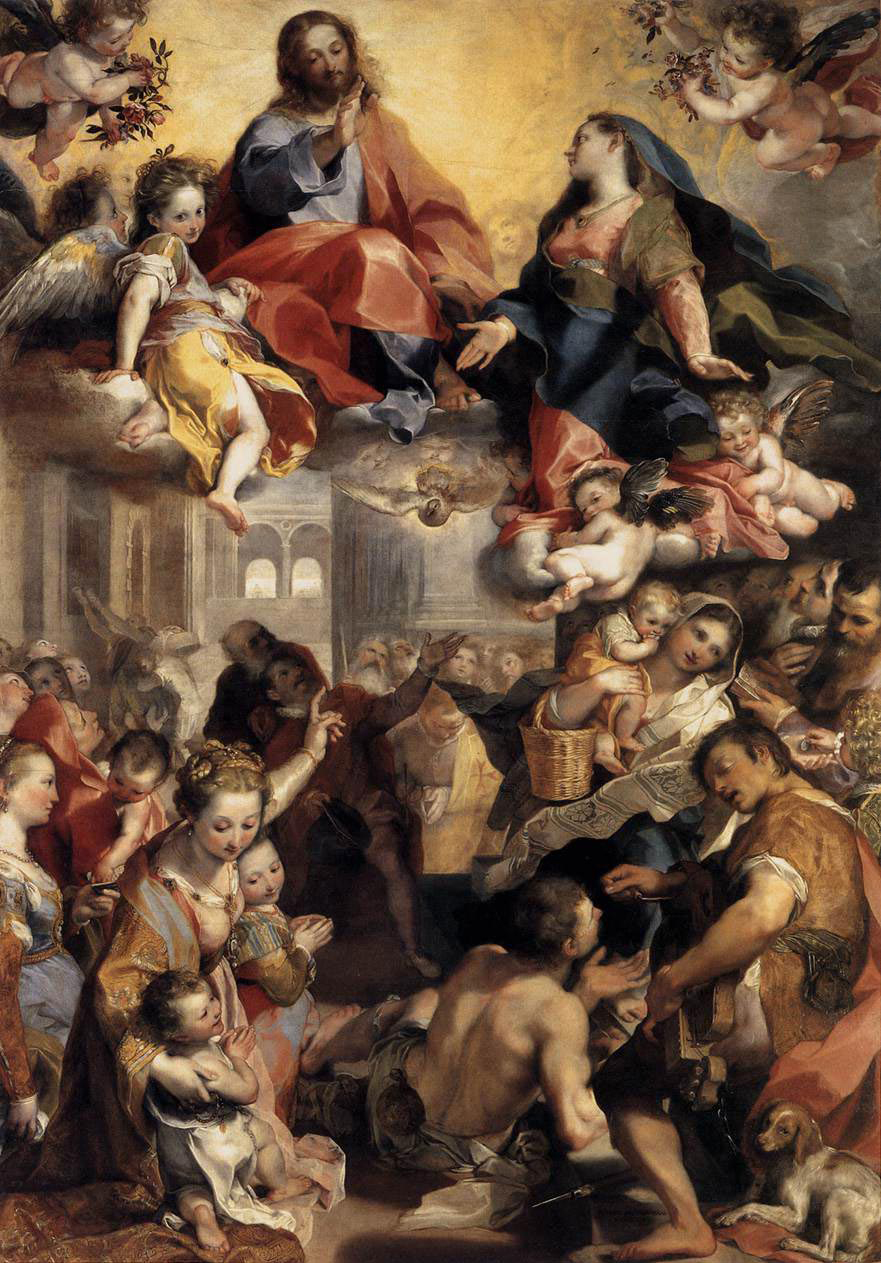
Federico Barocci, Madonna del Popolo (Madonna of the people) 1579

The title Mother of the Church (in Latin Mater Ecclesiae) was officially given to the Virgin Mary during the Second Vatican Council by Pope Paul VI. This title goes back to Ambrose of Milan in the 4th century, but this use was not known until its 1944 rediscovery by Hugo Rahner. Rahner's Mariology, following Ambrose, saw Mary in her role within the church, his interpretation being based solely on Ambrose and the early Fathers.

The Catechism of the Catholic Church states that the Virgin Mary is mother of the church and of all its members, namely all Christians:

The Virgin Mary ... is acknowledged and honoured as being truly the Mother of God and of the redeemer. ... since she has by her charity joined in bringing about the birth of believers in the Church, who are members of its head. ... Mary, Mother of Christ, Mother of the Church.

Pope Paul VI's Credo of the People of God states:

The Mother of the Church, carries on in heaven her maternal role with regard to the members of Christ, cooperating in the birth and development of divine life in the souls of the redeemed.

In Redemptoris Mater Pope John Paul II referred to Paul VI's "Credo of the People of God" as a reaffirmation of the statement that Mary is the "mother of the entire Christian people, both faithful and pastors" and wrote that the Credo "restated this truth in an even more forceful way":

Pope Benedict XVI also referred to the Credo of Paul VI and stated that it sums up all of the scriptural texts that relate to the matter.

In his homily on 2015 New Year's Day, Pope Francis said that Jesus and his mother Mary are "inseparable", just like Jesus and the church. Mary is "the Mother of the Church, and through the Church, the mother of all men and women, and of every people".

=== Mediatrix ===
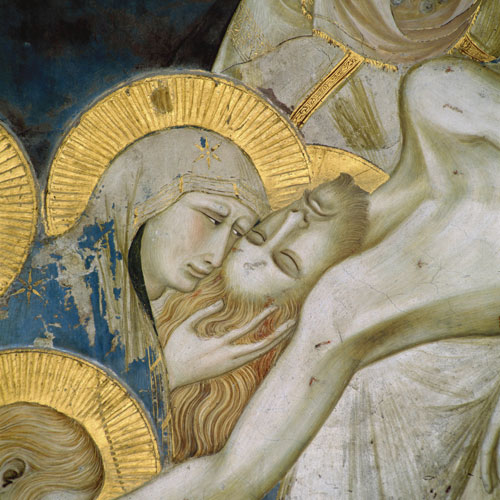
Pietro Lorenzetti, 1310

In Catholic teachings, Jesus Christ is the only mediator between God and man. He alone reconciled through his death on the Cross creator and creation. But this does not exclude a secondary mediating role for Mary, preparatory, supportive; in the view of several prominent, but not all, Catholics. The teaching that Mary intercedes for all believers and especially those who request her intercession through prayer has been held in the church since early times; for example, by Ephraim, the Syrian: "after the mediator a mediatrix for the whole world. Mediation is something that can be said of all the heavenly saints, but Mary is seen as having the greatest power of mediation. The earliest surviving recorded prayer to Mary is the Sub tuum praesidium, written in Greek.

Mary has increasingly been seen as a principal dispenser of God's graces and Advocate for the people of God and is mentioned as such in several official church documents. Pope Pius IX used the title in Ineffabilis Deus. In the first of his so-called "Rosary encyclicals", Supremi apostolatus officio (1883), Pope Leo XIII calls Our Lady "the guardian of our peace and the dispensatrix of heavenly graces". The following year, 1884, his encyclical Superiore anno speaks of the prayers presented to God "through her whom He has chosen to be the dispenser of all heavenly graces". Pope Pius X employed this title in Ad diem illum in 1904, Pope Benedict XV introduced it into the Marian liturgy when he created the Marian feast of Mary, Mediatrix of all Graces in 1921, In his 1954 encyclical Ad caeli reginam, Pope Pius XII calls Mary the Mediatrix of peace.

A lay movement called Vox Populi Mariae Mediatrici promotes the doctrine of Mary as Co-Redemptrix, Mediatrix and Advocate. Co-Redemptrix refers to the participation of Mary in the salvation process. Irenaeus, the Church Father (died 200), referred to Mary as "causa salutis" [cause of our salvation] given her "fiat". It is a way of speaking which has been considered since the 15th century, but "Pope Francis appeared to flatly reject proposals in some theological circles to add 'co-redemptrix' to the list of titles of the Virgin Mary, saying the mother of Jesus never took anything that belonged to her son, and calling the invention of new titles and dogmas 'foolishness'."

The decree Lumen gentium of Vatican II cautioned about using the title of "Mediatrix", saying that: "this, however, is to be so understood that it neither takes away from nor adds anything to the dignity and efficaciousness of Christ the one Mediator". A Mariological Congress held in Częstochowa, Poland, in August 1996 determined that it was not opportune to use this title of Mary for, as pointed out at Vatican II, it has its limits and can be misunderstood.

== Encyclicals ==
Popes have been important in shaping both the theological and the devotional aspects of the Catholic perspective on the Virgin Mary. Theologically, popes have highlighted the inner link between the Virgin Mary and Jesus Christ, in the encyclicals Mystici corporis and Redemptoris Mater.

- Pope Pius X
  - Ad diem illum
- Pope Pius XII
  - Fulgens corona
  - Ad Caeli Reginam

== Marian devotions from sacred tradition ==
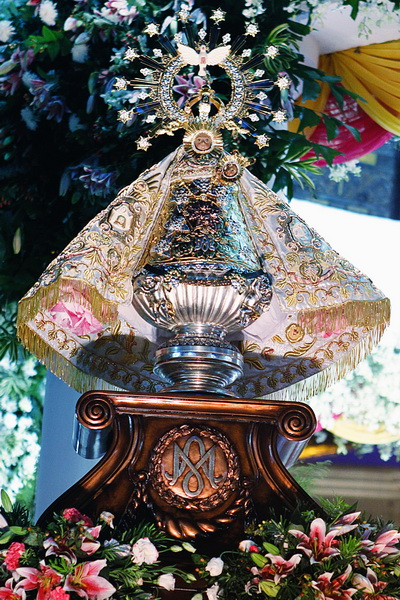
Our Lady of Peñafrancia in Naga City, Philippines

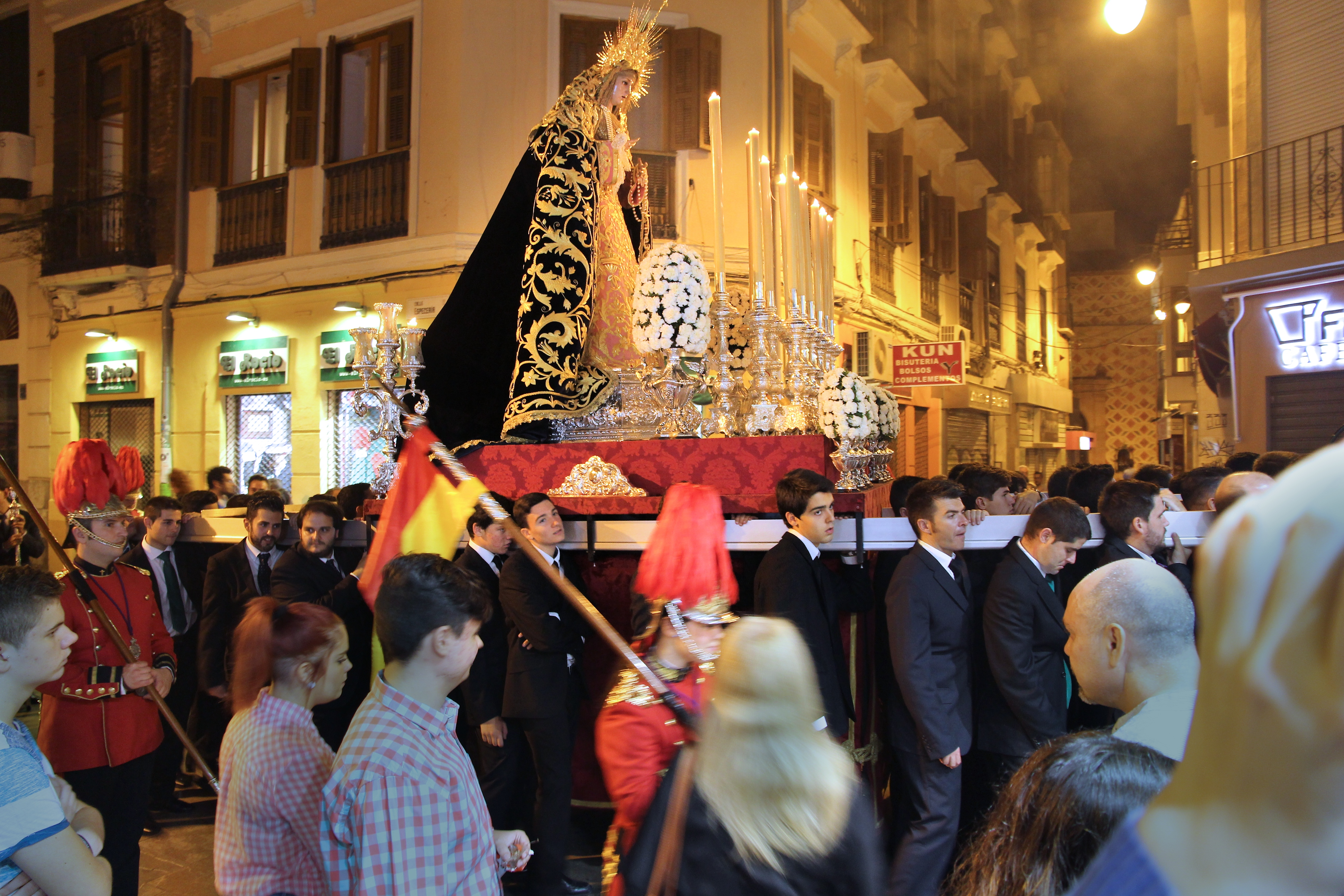
Night Rosary procession in Málaga, Spain

Marian devotions are highly prominent within the Catholic tradition and a wide variety of devotions ranging from Consecration to Mary, to the wearing of Scapulars, to First Saturdays, to multi-day prayers such as Rosary, Angelus & Novenas are practiced by Catholics.

The spread of Marian devotions, such as the Rosary via lay organizations, has also influenced popular interest in Mariology. Marian devotions generally begin at the level of popular piety, often in connection with the religious experiences and visions of simple and modest individuals (in some cases children), and the recounting of their experiences in time creates strong emotions among numerous Catholics.

Theologians have at times cited in support of their Mariology the constant sensus fidelium, e.g., Alphonsus Liguori valued texts and traditions of the Church Fathers as expressions of the sensus fidelium of the past and attributed great weight to the argument that "the greater part of the faithful have always had recourse to the intercession of the divine mother for all the graces which they desire". Speaking of the witness of the Church Fathers in attributing certain titles to Mary, in Fulgens corona Pope Pius XII wrote:

If the popular praises of the Blessed Virgin Mary be given the careful consideration they deserve, who will dare to doubt that she, who was purer than the angels and at all times pure, was at any moment, even for the briefest instant, not free from every stain of sin?

The Marian dogmas of the Immaculate Conception and the Assumption of Mary were defined in part on the basis of the sensus fidei, "the supernatural appreciation of faith on the part of the whole people, when, from the bishops to the last of the faithful, they manifest a universal consent in matters of faith and morals". In the case of the dogmas of Immaculate Conception and Assumption, the two popes concerned consulted the Catholic bishops worldwide about the faith of the community before proceeding to define the dogma.

Referring to these dogmas, in 2010 Pope Benedict XVI called the People of God the "teacher that goes first" and stated:

Faith both in the Immaculate Conception and in the bodily Assumption of the Virgin was already present in the People of God, while theology had not yet found the key to interpreting it in the totality of the doctrine of the faith. The People of God therefore precede theologians and this is all thanks to that supernatural sensus fidei, namely, that capacity infused by the Holy Spirit that qualifies us to embrace the reality of the faith with humility of heart and mind. In this sense, the People of God is the "teacher that goes first" and must then be more deeply examined and intellectually accepted by theology.

Marian devotions have been encouraged by popes, and in Marialis cultus Pope Paul VI stated: "From the moment when we were called to the See of Peter, we have constantly striven to enhance devotion to the Blessed Virgin Mary. In Rosarium Virginis Mariae, Pope John Paul II stated: "Among all devotions that which most consecrates and conforms a soul to our Lord is devotion to Mary.

Devotion to the Virgin Mary does not, however, amount to worship – which is reserved for God; Catholics view Mary as subordinate to Christ, but uniquely so, in that she is seen as above all other creatures. In 787 the Second Council of Nicaea affirmed a three-level hierarchy of latria, hyperdulia and dulia that applies to God, the Virgin Mary and then to the other saints.

=== Marian processions ===
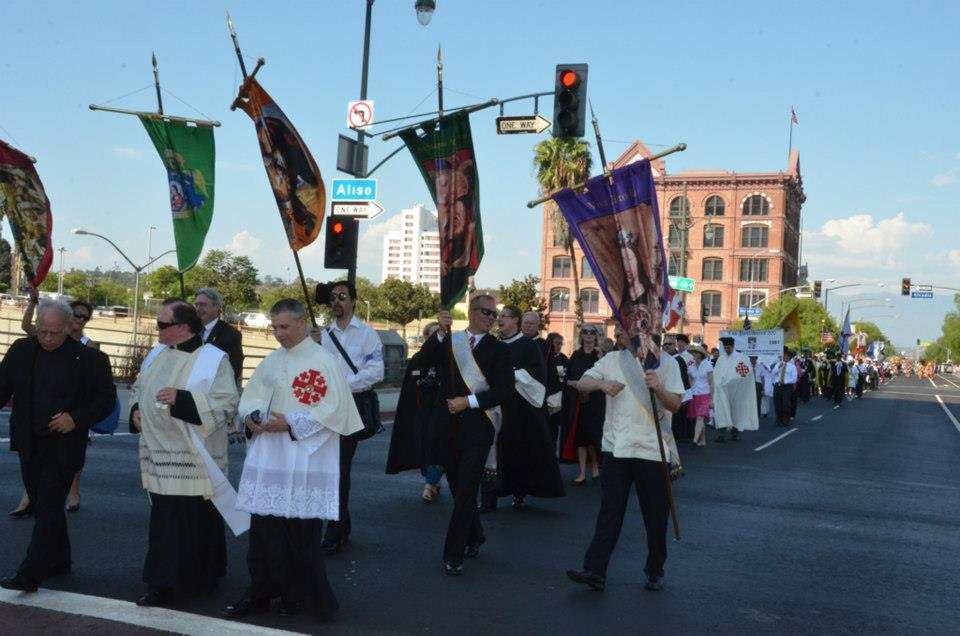
The annual Grand Marian Procession through Downtown Los Angeles

In Los Angeles, California, a Marian procession took place annually for roughly the first 100 years following the founding of the city. In an attempt to revive the custom of religious processions, in September 2011 the Queen of Angels Foundation inaugurated an annual "Grand Marian Procession" in the heart of Downtown Los Angeles' historic core. This yearly procession, intended to coincide with the anniversary of the founding of the City of Los Angeles, begins outside of the parish of La Iglesia de Nuestra Señora Reina de los Angeles which is part of the Los Angeles Plaza Historic District, better known as "La Placita". By way of city streets, the procession eventually terminates at the Cathedral of Our Lady of the Angels where a public Rosary and Mass in honour of the Blessed Virgin Mary are offered. Subsequent years have seen the involvement and participation of numerous chivalric, fraternal, and religious orders, parishes, lay groups, political figures, as well as other religious and civic organizations.

== Differing perspectives ==
Throughout the centuries, Catholics have viewed the Virgin Mary from a number of perspectives, at times derived from specific Marian attributes ranging from queenship to humility and at other times based on cultural preferences of events taking place at specific points in history. In parallel with the traditional approaches to Mariology, opposing views based on progressive interpretations have been presented by feminists, psychologists and liberal Catholics.

=== Traditional views ===
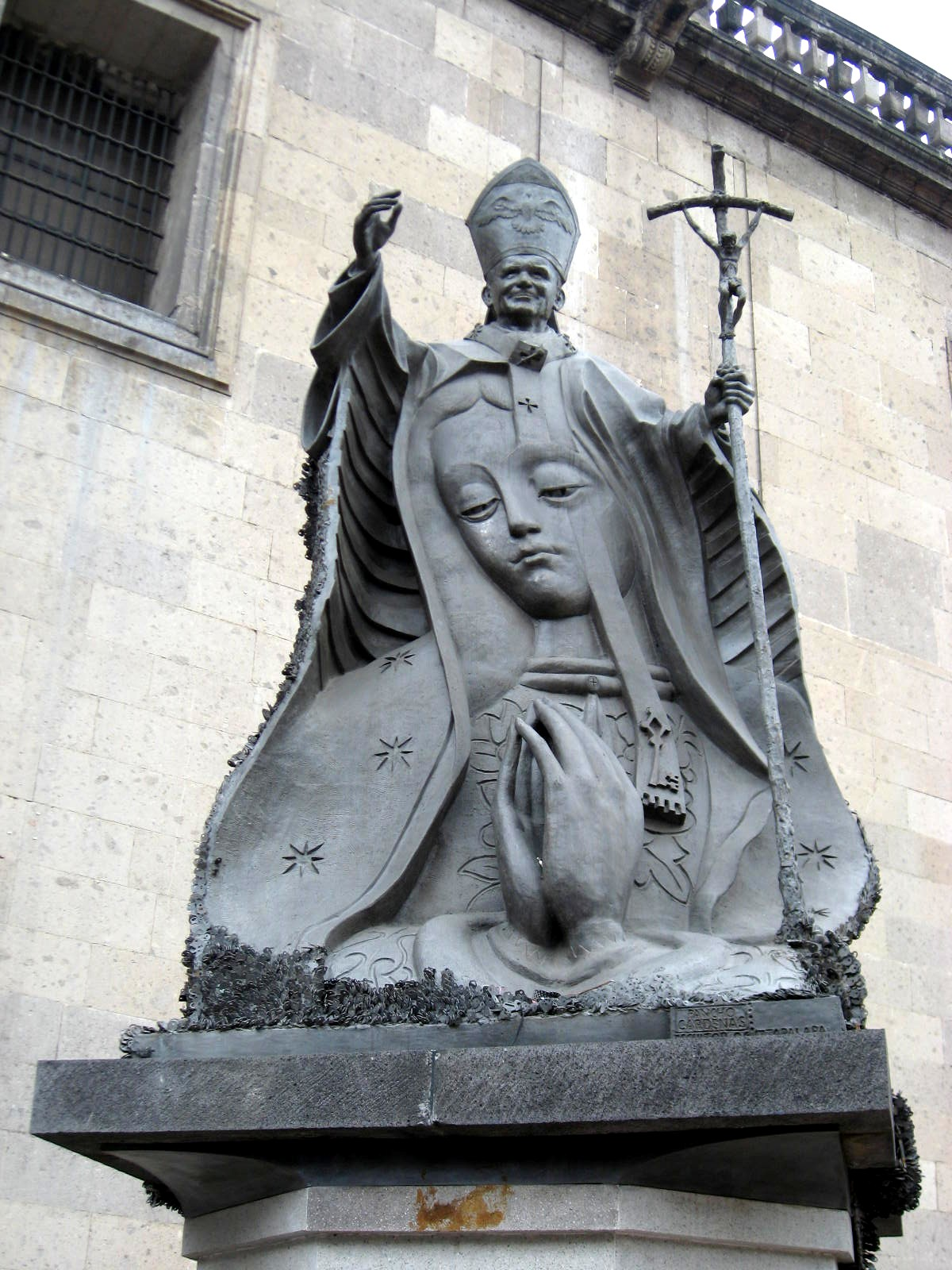
A statue of John Paul II with Our Lady of Guadalupe, by Pacho Cárdenas, made entirely with keys donated by Mexicans to symbolize that they had given him the "keys to their hearts".

Traditional views on Mary have emphasized the Marian dogmas and doctrines, accompanied by devotions and venerations. Some of these views have changed and been transformed over time.

An example of the changing perspectives on the Virgin Mary based on specific spiritual views, and its adoption within a culture a world away, is the transformation of the image of Mary from a Heavenly Queen to a mother of humility, and the construction of views to accommodate both perspectives. While depictions of the Virgin Mary as the Queen of Heaven or Coronation of the Virgin by artists such as Paolo Veneziano or Giuliano da Rimini were common in the early part of the 14th century, they did not fit with the virtue of humility which was a key tenet of the spirituality of Francis of Assisi. The concept of the Virgin of humility was developed in the 14th century in order to accommodate Franciscan piety, by depicting the Madonna sitting on the ground, rather than on a throne. It offered a view of the Virgin Mary (often barefoot) as a mother nursing a child, rather than a Queen in a coronation scene.

As the Franciscans began to preach in China, the notion of the Virgin of humility resonated well with the Chinese, partly due to the cultural acceptance of humility as a virtue in China, and partly due to its similarity to the motherly, merciful figure of Kuanyin, which was much admired in south China. However, by the middle of the 15th century, a dual view had emerged in Europe, as represented by Domenico di Bartolo's 1433 Madonna of humility which expressed the symbolic duality of her nature: an earthly barefoot woman, as well as a heavenly queen. Despite her low, sitting position, the depiction of stars, and the gems, as well as a halo, signify the regal status of the Virgin, as she is being attended to while she holds the Child Jesus.

Juan Diego's account of the appearance of the Virgin of Guadalupe to him in 1531 on Tepeyac Hill in Mexico provides another example of the cultural adaptation of the view of the Virgin Mary. Juan Diego did not describe the Virgin Mary as either European or Middle Eastern, but as a tanned Aztec princess who spoke in his local Nahuatl language, and not in Spanish. The image of the Virgin of Guadalupe that is highly venerated in Mexico has the appearance of an Indigenous Central American, rather than a European woman, and the clothing of the Virgin of Guadalupe has been identified as that of an Aztec princess. The Virgin of Guadalupe was a turning point in the conversion of Latin America to Catholicism, and is the primary view of Mary among millions of Catholics in Mexico in the 21st century. Pope John Paul II reinforced the localization of this view by permitting local Aztec dances during the ceremony in which he declared Juan Diego a saint, spoke in Nahuatl as part of the ceremony, called Juan Diego "the talking eagle", and asked him to show "the way that leads to the Dark Virgin of Tepeyac".

The view of the Virgin Mary as a "miracle worker" has existed for centuries and is still held by many Catholics in the 21st century. The legends of the miracles of the Maddona of Orsanmichele in Florence go back to the Renaissance. The legends of miracles performed by the image of the Black Madonna of Częstochowa also go back for centuries, and it continues to be venerated today as the Patron of Poland. Every year, millions of Catholic pilgrims visit the Basilica at Our Lady of Lourdes in search of miraculous cures. Although millions of Catholics hope for miracles on their pilgrimages, the Vatican has generally been reluctant to approve of modern miracles, unless they have been subject to extensive analysis.

=== Liberal perspectives ===
Since the end of the 19th century, a number of progressive and liberal perspectives of Mariology have been presented, ranging from feminist criticisms to interpretations based on modern psychology and liberal Catholic viewpoints. These views are generally critical of the Catholic approach to Mariology as well as the Eastern Orthodox Church, which has even more Marian emphasis within its official liturgy.

Some feminists contend that, as with other women saints such as Joan of Arc, the image of Mary is a construct of the patriarchal mind. They argue that Marian dogmas and doctrines and the typical forms of Marian devotion reinforce patriarchy by offering women temporary comfort from the ongoing oppression inflicted on them by male dominated churches and societies. In the feminist view, old gender stereotypes persist within traditional Marian teachings and theological doctrines. To that end books on feminist Mariology have been published to present opposing interpretations and perspectives.

The psychological analysis of Marian teachings dates back to Sigmund Freud, who used the title of a poem by Goethe in his 1911 paper Great is Diana of the Ephesians. Carl Jung, on the other hand, viewed the Virgin Mary as a spiritual and more loving goddess version of Eros. A large number of other psychological interpretations have been presented through the years, ranging from the study of the similarities of the Virgin Mary and the Buddhist goddess Tara, or the humble and loving figure presented by the East Asian goddess Kwan Yin.

Since the Reformation many Christians have opposed Marian venerations, and that trend has continued into the 21st century among progressive and liberal Christians, who see the high level of attention paid to the Virgin Mary both as being without sufficient grounding in Scripture and as distracting from the worship that is due to Christ.

Groups of liberal Catholics view the traditional image of the Virgin Mary as presented by the Catholic Church as an obstacle towards realization of the goal of womanhood, and as a symbol of the systemic patriarchal oppression of women within the church. Moreover, some liberal Catholics view the cultivation of the traditional image of Mary as a method of manipulation of Catholics at large by the church hierarchy. Other liberal Christians argue that the modern concepts of equal opportunity for men and women does not resonate well with the humble image of Mary, obediently and subserviently kneeling before Christ.

== Eastern Catholic differences from Latin Church ==
Eastern Catholics, part of the Catholic Church like those in the Latin Church, sometimes differ in Marian theology from Latin Catholics.

=== Assumption of Mary ===
The traditional Eastern expression of this doctrine is the Dormition of the Theotokos which emphasizes her falling asleep to be later assumed into heaven. The differences in these observances is for some Eastern Catholics superficial. However, Latin Catholics in general disagree with this eastern understanding. Notably, in the Coptic tradition, followed by Coptic Catholics and Coptic Orthodox, the Dormition and the Assumption of St Mary are observed at different times of year.

=== Immaculate Conception ===
The doctrine of the Immaculate Conception is a teaching of Eastern origin but expressed in the terminology of the Western Church. The Western concept of the Virgin Mary being free from original sin as defined by Augustine of Hippo is not accepted in the East. However, Eastern Catholics recognized from ancient times that Mary was preserved by God from the contagion of original sin. Eastern Catholics – while not observing the holy day as it appears on the General Roman Calendar – affirm it and sometimes dedicate churches to the Virgin Mary under this title.

== Centers for Mariological studies ==
The formal study of Mariology within the circles associated with the Holy See took a major step forward between the Holy Year 1950 and 1958 based on the actions of Pope Pius XII, who authorized institutions for increased academic research into the veneration of the Blessed Virgin Mary.

- Pontifical Marian International Academy – The PAMI is an international pontifical organization connecting all Promoters of Mariology, Catholics, Orthodox, Protestants and Muslim. John XXIII with the Apostolic Letter Maiora in Dies defined the purpose of the PAMI: to promote and animate studies of Mariology through International Mariological Marian Congresses and other academic meetings and to see to the publication of their studies. The PAMI has the task of coordinating the other Marian Academies and Societies that exist all over the world and to exercise vigilance against any Marian excess or minimalism. For this reason the Pope determined that in the academy there be a Council that assures the organization of Congresses and the coordination of the Mariological Societies, Promoters and Teachers of Mariology.
- Academia Mariana Salesiana – He allowed the foundation of the Academia Mariana Salesiana, which is a part of a papal university. The academy supports Salesian studies to further the veneration of the Blessed Virgin in the tradition of John Bosco.
- Centro Mariano Montfortano – Also in 1950, the Centro Mariano Montfortano was moved from Bergamo to Rome. The Centro promulgates the teachings of Louis de Montfort, who was earlier canonized by Pius XII. It publishes the monthly Madre e Regina, which promulgates the Marian orientation of Montfort.
- Marianum was created in 1950 and entrusted to the Order of Servites. It is authorized to grant all academic degrees, including a doctorate in theology. Since 1976, every two years the Marianum organizes international conferences to find modern formulations which approximate the mystery of Mary.
- Collegamento Mariano Nazionale (1958) – the last Marian initiative of Pope Pius XII. It coordinates activities of Marian centres in Italy, and organizes Marian pilgrimages and Marian study weeks for priests. In addition it started Marian youth gatherings and publishes the journal Madonna.

Of these organizations, the Marianum Pontifical Theological Faculty is the most active Marilogical centre in Rome. This Pontifical Catholic Faculty was founded by Father Gabriel Roschini (who directed it for several years) under the direction of Pope Pius XII in 1950. At the Marianum, one can get a master's degree in Mariology (2-year academic program) and one can also get a doctorate in Mariology. This Mariological facility has a library with more than 85,000 volumes on Mariology and a number of magazines and journals of theological and Mariological concern. Marianum is also the name of the prestigious journal of Marian theology, founded by Father Roschini in 1939.

In 1975, the University of Dayton in Ohio formed the International Marian Research Institute in affiliation with the Marianum to offer a doctorate in sacred theology (S.T.D.) and a licentiate in sacred theology (S.T.L.).

== See also ==
- Anglican Marian theology
- Anglican Roman Catholic International Commission
- Holy Rosary
- Josephology
- Marian dogmas
- Mariology
- Protestant views of Mary
