= Western Front =

Western Front or West Front may refer to:

== Military frontiers ==
- Western Front (World War I), a military frontier to the west of Germany
- Western Front (World War II), a military frontier to the west of Germany
- Western Front (Russian Empire), a major unit of the Imperial Russian Army during World War I
- Western Front (RSFSR), a Red Army group during the Russian Civil War and the Polish-Soviet War
- Western Front (Soviet Union), an army group of the Soviet Union
- Greco-Turkish War (1919–1922), known in Turkey as the Western Front of the Turkish War of Independence
- Operation Chengiz Khan, in the Indo-Pakistani War of 1971

== Art, entertainment and media ==
- West Front (video game), a 1998 video game
- Western Front (album), a 2006 album by Carbon/Silicon
- Western Front (band), an American band active from 1985 to 1986
- The Western Front (book), a 2000 book by Richard Holmes about the First World War
- The Western Front, a newspaper of Western Washington University
- The Western Front (TV series), an Australian sports program broadcast from 2002 to 2011
- Joel Feeney and the Western Front, a 1991 album
- The Western Front (film), a 2010 American documentary film
- The Great War: Western Front, a 2023 video game
- West Front (wargame), a 1985 WWII board wargame

== Other uses ==
- USS Western Front (ID-1787), a cargo ship that saw service as a naval auxiliary in World War I
- Western Front Association, a UK-based charity
- Western Front Society, an artist-run centre in Vancouver, Canada
- Westwork or "west front", the west-facing entrance section of a Carolingian, Ottonian, or Romanesque church
