= Lebensraum! (wargame) =

WWII board wargame

Cover art by John Kula

Lebensraum, subtitled "The Campaign in the East, 1941–1945", is a board wargame published by Simulations Canada in 1984 that simulates, at a strategic level, Russo-German conflict on the Eastern Front during World War II. It can be married to another Simulations Canada game, West Front, which deals with the European Theatre, producing a large game covering the conflict from England to Russia and Norway to the Mediterranean.

== Description ==
Lebensraum is a two-person wargame in which one player controls Allied forces and the other controls Axis forces. The hex grid map scaled at 80 km (50 mi) per hex depicts Eastern Europe from Oslo to Archangel in the north and from Tirana to Baku in the south. Other components include 400 double-sided counters, and a 12-page rule book.

The game, described as complex, is designed to use the same rules as the previously published game Lebensraum!, and focusses on economic rather than military factors. Assignment of leadership also plays a critical role. Rules cover airpower, naval support, partisans, production centers, and transportation networks.

=== Scenarios ===
Four scenarios are included: three shorter scenarios covering various periods of the war that range in length from 3 to 13 turns; and one long 18-turn scenario covering the war from Operation Barbarossa in 1941 to Spring 1945.

== Publication history ==
Stephen Newberg designed Lebensraum! as a game primarily focussed on leadership and economics. As Newberg later wrote, "It took a long time for me to decide what I thought was missing in all those East Front strategic games: leaders and economics. Most games brushed one or the other, but in a lot of ways the war in the East centered on these influences, so the design of Lebensraum! made them major systems."

Simulations Canada published Lebensraum! in 1984 with a print run of 1000 copies featuring cover art by John Kula, and the game sold well.

A year later, Simulations Canada published another Newberg game, West Front, that simulated the Western European Theatre, using the same rules system as Lebensraum! Combining the two games creates a larger game that covers the entire European Theatre starting with the German invasion of the Soviet Union in 1941.

In 2018, Compass Games reissued Lebensraum! and West Front together in one box titled "Lebensraum: The War For Europe, 1941-1945", with cover art by Ilya Kudriashov.

== Reception ==
In Issue 55 of Fire & Movement, Paul Pigulski commented, "One of the genuine beauties of the game is the ease of play. Games flow smoothly and, more often than not, quickly." Reviewing the combination of Lebensraum and West Front, Pugulski wrote, "What sets Lebensraum/West Front apart from other strategic level, World war II European Theater games is the economic dimension. Indeed, it is the focus of the game, forcing military concerns into a position of secondary importance. It is an economic game with an economic system much advanced over the likes of, say, Third Reich [ Avalon Hill, 1974]. It is interwoven into the game fabric in a subtle yet dramatic way. For example, the number of movement points a player receives is the direct result of oil procured and functioning refineries. This goes a long way in helping players understand why Hitler REALLY turned the panzers from the gates of Moscow towards the south of the Soviet Union."
