= West Front (wargame) =

WWII board wargame

West Front, subtitled "The Campaign in Europe, 1943–1945, is a board wargame published by Simulations Canada in 1985 that simulates, at a strategic level, combat operations in the European Theater during World War II. It can be married to another Simulations Canada game, Lebensraum!, which deals with the Eastern Front, producing a large game covering the conflict from England to Russia and Norway to the Mediterranean.

== Description ==
West Front is a two-person wargame in which one player controls Allied forces and the other controls Axis forces. The hex grid map scaled at 80 km (50 mi) per hex depicts Western Europe from Greece to Spain in the south and from Ireland to Germany in the north. Other components include 400 double-sided counters, and a 12-page rule book.

The game, described as complex, is designed to use the same rules as the previously published game Lebensraum, where economic rather than military factors are foremost, and assignment of leadership plays a critical role. Rules also cover airpower, naval support, partisans, production centers, and transportation networks.

Two scenarios are included: starting at the 1943 Allied landings in Sicily, or the 1944 D-Day landings in Normandy. A third scenario allows the Allied player to choose any non-historical landing site.

== Publication history ==
Stephen Newberg designed West Front as a companion game to his previous game Lebensraum (1984), which simulates the Russo-German Eastern Front. Combining the two games creates a larger game that covers the entire European theatre from London to Moscow starting with the German invasion of Russia. Simulations Canada published West Front in 1985 featuring cover art by Newberg and John Kula. Designer Newberg later wrote that "This was the follow up to Lebensraum, bringing in the Western Europe Front 1943-1945. As with most follow ups that are not part of the original concept, it is not as good."

In 2018, Compass Games reissued Lebensraum and West Front together in one box titled "Lebensraum: The War For Europe, 1941-1945", with cover art by Ilya Kudriashov.

== Reception ==
In Issue 55 of Fire & Movement, Paul Pigulski reviewed the combination of Lebensraum and West Front and commented, "What sets Lebensraum/West Front apart from other strategic level, World war II European Theatre games is the economic dimension. Indeed, it is the focus of the game, forcing military concerns into a position of secondary importance. It is an economic game with an economic system much advanced over the likes of, say, Third Reich [ Avalon Hill, 1974]. It is interwoven into the game fabric in a subtle yet dramatic way. For example, the number of movement points a player receives is the direct result of oil procured and functioning refineries. This goes a long way in helping players understand why Hitler REALLY turned the panzers from the gates of Moscow towards the south of the Soviet Union."

In Issue 65 of Fire & Movement, Jeff Petraska liked the economic game but found the components uninspiring, writing, "The twist to this game is the emphasis upon economic considerations. The game's main drawback is its drab, uninspired graphics."
