= Sensus fidelium =

Sense of the faith in the Catholic Church

Sensus fidei (sense of the faith), also called sensus fidelium (sense of the faithful) is, according to the Catechism of the Catholic Church, "the supernatural appreciation of faith on the part of the whole people, when, from the bishops to the last of the faithful, they manifest a universal consent in matters of faith and morals." Quoting the document Lumen gentium of the Second Vatican Council, the Catechism adds: "By this appreciation of the faith, aroused and sustained by the Spirit of truth, the People of God, guided by the sacred teaching authority,... receives... the faith, once for all delivered to the saints. ...The People unfailingly adheres to this faith, penetrates it more deeply with right judgment, and applies it more fully in daily life." The foundation of this can be found in Jesus' saying in Matthew 16:18 that "the gates of Hell will not prevail against it," where "it" refers to the "Church", that is, the Lord's people that carries forward the living tradition of essential beliefs throughout history, with the Bishops overseeing that this tradition does not pursue the way of error.

The terms sensus fidei fidelium (sense of the faith on the part of the faithful) and sensus fidei fidelis (sense of the faith on the part of an individual member of the faithful) are also used.

== Use by the magisterium ==
Consensus among the faithful is a powerful witness to the truth of a doctrine, but that consensus is not what makes the doctrine true. The consensus is a result, not a cause of the truth of the doctrine.

The sensus fidei, the universal consent, from the bishops to the last of the faithful, in a matter of faith, preceded the definition of the Marian dogmas of the Immaculate Conception and the Assumption of Mary: Pope Benedict XVI said: "Faith both in the Immaculate Conception and in the bodily Assumption of the Virgin was already present in the People of God, while theology had not yet found the key to interpreting it in the totality of the doctrine of the faith. The People of God therefore precede theologians and this is all thanks to that supernatural sensus fidei, namely, that capacity infused by the Holy Spirit that qualifies us to embrace the reality of the faith with humility of heart and mind. In this sense, the People of God is the 'teacher that goes first' and must then be more deeply examined and intellectually accepted by theology." In each case, the dogma was defined "not so much because of proofs in scripture or ancient tradition, but due to a profound sensus fidelium and the Magisterium." Each of the two popes concerned consulted the bishops of the world about the faith of the Catholic community before proceeding to define the dogma.

Pope Francis invoked the sensus fidelium's ability to "perceive something mysterious, beyond our human logic" in his reflections on the tradition whereby believers, in their mystical union with Jesus Christ, seek to provide consolation to Jesus in recognition of his sufferings endured on their behalf.

== Officially excluded understandings ==
=== Views of laity alone ===
The Second Vatican Council made it clear that sensus fidelium (sense of the faithful) does not mean sensus laicorum (sense of the lay people), as if it were a charism granted to the laity in isolation from the Catholic Church hierarchy, and as if the clergy were not included among "the faithful". It stated:

The entire body of the faithful, anointed as they are by the Holy One, cannot err in matters of belief. They manifest this special property by means of the whole people's supernatural discernment in matters of faith when "from the Bishops down to the last of the lay faithful" they show universal agreement in matters of faith and morals. That discernment in matters of faith is aroused and sustained by the Spirit of truth. It is exercised under the guidance of the sacred teaching authority, in faithful and respectful obedience to which the people of God accepts that which is not just the word of men but truly the word of God.

It declared that Christ fulfils his prophetic office "not only through the hierarchy who teach in His name and with His authority, but also through the laity whom He made His witnesses and to whom He gave understanding of the faith [sensus fidei] and an attractiveness in speech so that the power of the Gospel might shine forth in their daily social and family life.

According to Saint Augustine of Hippo: "for you I am a bishop, together with you I am a Christian" (in Latin: vobis sum episcopus, vobiscum sum christianus).

=== Independent of Church magisterium ===
In a speech to the International Theological Commission on 7 December 2012, Pope Benedict XVI distinguished between the authentic meaning of sensus fidei and a counterfeit understanding: "It is certainly not a kind of public ecclesial opinion, and invoking it in order to contest the teachings of the Magisterium would be unthinkable, since the sensus fidei cannot be authentically developed in believers, except to the extent in which they fully participate in the life of the Church, and this demands responsible adherence to the Magisterium, to the deposit of faith.

This distinction was expressed also by the Second Vatican Council in the passage quoted above, in which it states that the discernment of the faithful in matters of faith and morals "is exercised under the guidance of the sacred teaching authority, in faithful and respectful obedience to which the people of God accepts that which is not just the word of men but truly the word of God".

What may be a contrary view was expressed in an article by the editorial staff of the progressive United States periodical National Catholic Reporter: "Blessed John Henry Newman said that there are three magisteria in the church: the bishops, the theologians, and the people. On the issue of women's ordination, two of the three voices have been silenced, which is why the third voice must now make itself heard. ...Our message is that we believe the sensus fidelium is that the exclusion of women from the priesthood has no strong basis in Scripture or any other compelling rationale; therefore, women should be ordained. We have heard the faithful assent to this in countless conversations in parish halls, lecture halls, and family gatherings. It has been studied and prayed over individually and in groups." A branch of the Cardinal Newman Society countered this view by quoting what the Pope coincidentally said only four days later, and by commenting: "One need not look very far in Catholic circles nowadays to find some mention of sensus fidelium which literally means 'sense of faith'. ... Recently, the term has been misused to argue for same-sex 'marriage', contraception and even women's ordination. It's a form of 'Magisterium by Gallup' in which a person argues that most Catholics agree with them on an issue, so even though the Magisterium says otherwise, they hold the trump card because of sensus fidei." Cardinal Newman's actual view is that only the Ecclesia docens ("teaching Church", magisterium) discerns, discriminates, defines, promulgates, and enforces any portion of the tradition of the Apostles committed to the whole Church.

Cardinal Charles Journet wrote that the sensus fidei is "neither a teaching nor a magisterium, but only the felt conviction of a truth." Believers can mix with their faith data or feelings foreign to it and they therefore need, he said, "to be helped, directed, judged by the divinely assisted magisterium." The magisterium for its part "has the task of discerning and confirming what is pre-felt, indicated, and anticipated by the sensus fidei."

=== Identified with prevailing opinion ===
The Congregation for the Doctrine of the Faith ruled out the "sociological argumentation which holds that the opinion of a large number of Christians would be a direct and adequate expression of the "supernatural sense of the faith" (sensus fidei). It commented: "The believer can still have erroneous opinions since all his thoughts do not spring from faith. Not all the ideas which circulate among the People of God are compatible with the faith. This is all the more so given that people can be swayed by a public opinion influenced by modern communications media. Not without reason did the Second Vatican Council emphasize the indissoluble bond between the sensus fidei and the guidance of God's People by the magisterium of the Pastors. These two realities cannot be separated."

With regard to passing a judgement on the attitude reflected in the activities of the Inquisition, Pope John Paul II stated: "The theologians will be guided by a distinction in their critical reflection: the distinction between the authentic sensus fidei and the predominant mentality in a specific epoch that might have influenced their opinion. The sensus fidei must be asked to exercise the criteria of a level judgment of the life of the Church in the past."

Theologian Cardinal Georges Cottier wrote: "Obviously, the sensus fidei is not to be identified with the consensus of the majority, it is not defined on the basis of the statistics of polls. In the history of the Church it has happened that in certain contexts the sensus fidei has been manifested by isolated individuals, single saints, while general opinion hung on to doctrines not conforming to the apostolic faith."

Donal Dorr instead has commented critically on what he sees as the Church's failure to effectively listen to what he views as the sensus fidei, which he perhaps looks for in Third World countries, since he also speaks of actual Catholic social teaching as showing a western and ethnocentric leaning.

Addressing a group of theologians in December 2013, Pope Francis said: "By the gift of the Holy Spirit, the members of the Church possess a 'sense of faith'. This is a kind of 'spiritual instinct' that makes us sentire cum Ecclesia [think with the mind of the Church] and to discern that which is in conformity with the apostolic faith and is in the spirit of the Gospel. Of course, the sensus fidelium [sense of the faithful] cannot be confused with the sociological reality of a majority opinion. It is, therefore, important—and one of your tasks—to develop criteria that allow the authentic expressions of the sensus fidelium to be discerned. …This attention is of greatest importance for theologians. Pope Benedict XVI often pointed out that the theologian must remain attentive to the faith lived by the humble and the small, to whom it pleased the Father to reveal that which He had hidden from the learned and the wise.”

=== Concerned with Church governance ===
Confusing the sensus fidelium or sensus fidei with questions of governance departs from the teaching of the Council, which applies it instead to the teaching office of the Church.

The Second Vatican Council, quoted above, spoke of the sensus fidei as concerning the showing of "universal agreement in matter of faith and morals," a "discernment in matters of faith ... exercised under the guidance of the sacred teaching authority, in faithful and respectful obedience to which the people of God accepts that which is not just the word of men but truly the word of God."

== See also ==
- Private revelation
- Lay apostolate
- Commonitory

== Bibliography ==
- Finucane, Daniel J. (1996). Sensus Fidelium. The Use of a Concept in the Post-Vatican II Era. San Francisco/London: International Scholars Publishing. ISBN 1573090816.
- Rush, Ormond (June 2001). "Sensus Fidei: Faith 'Making Sense' of Revelation". Theological Studies. 62 (2). Milwaukee, Wisconsin: Marquette University: 231–261. ISSN 0040-5639. Archived from the original on 2016-01-23 – via Questia.
