= Mariology of the popes =

Papal influence on Marian theology and devotion

The Mariology of the popes is the theological study of the influence that the popes have had on the development, formulation and transformation of the Roman Catholic Church's doctrines and devotions relating to the Blessed Virgin Mary.

The development of Mariology over the centuries has been influenced by a number of factors, among which papal directives have often represented key milestones. Examples of papal influences include new Marian feast days, prayers, acceptance of new Marian congregations, indulgences, support for Marian apparitions (e.g. Lourdes and Fatima) and declaration of Marian dogmas.

"The century preceding the Second Vatican Council was arguably the most fertile era for Catholic Marian studies." A number of popes have made Marian themes a key part of their papacy, e.g. Leo XIII issued a record eleven encyclicals on the rosary, Pius XII invoked the case of ex cathedra papal infallibility to establish a Marian dogma and John Paul II built his personal coat of arms around the Marian Cross.

Popes have also highlighted the key Catholic Mariological theme of the link between the study of Mary and the development of a full Christology, e.g. as in Pius XII's Mystici corporis Christi and John Paul II's Redemptoris Mater.

== Papal influences on Mariology ==
Popes were highly important for the development of doctrine and the veneration of the Blessed Virgin. They made decisions not only in the area of Marian beliefs (Mariology) but also Marian practices and devotions. Popes promulgated Marian veneration and beliefs by authorizing: new Marian feast days, Marian prayers and initiatives, acceptance and support of Marian congregations, indulgences and special privileges, and support for Marian devotions.

The formal recognition of Marian apparitions (such as at Lourdes and Fatima) has also been influential. Popes have promoted Marian devotion through encyclicals, Apostolic Letters and with two dogmas (Immaculate Conception and Assumption), the promulgation of Marian years (Pius XII, John Paul II), visits to Marian shrines (Benedict XVI in 2007) and in 2018 Pope Francis decreed that the Memorial of the Blessed Virgin Mary, Mother of the Church be inserted into the Roman Calendar on the Monday after Pentecost (also known as Whit Monday).

Popular views like the Immaculate Conception and Assumption developed into papal teaching over time. Popes have also limited and cautioned against some devotional practices. In 1674 Pope Clement X (1670–1676) indexed books on Marian piety. After the Council of Trent, Marian fraternities were founded, fostering Marian piety, not all of which were approved.

Not all Popes took the same view on Marian beliefs and devotions. Pope Francis warned that it could not please Mary if we honor her in a way that diminishes the honor given to her divine Son.

== 13th to the 17th centuries ==
=== Clement IV ===
Pope Clement IV (1265–1268) created a poem on the seven joys of Mary, which in its form is considered an early version of the Franciscan rosary.

=== Pius V ===
On September 17, 1569, Pope Pius V issued the papal bull Consueverunt Romani Pontifices which popularized the rosary. Before the Battle of Lepanto in 1571 Pius V requested to the people of Europe to pray the rosary. After the victory of the Holy League, he declared a commemorative feast that later became the Feast of Our Lady of the Rosary. Pius V included in the catechism he promulgated the second part of the Hail Mary that had just been added in the Council of Trent: "Holy Mary, Mother of God, pray for us sinners."

=== Clement VIII ===
Pope Clement VIII (1592–1605) considered Marian piety the basis for Church reforms and issued the bull Dominici gregis (February 3, 1603) to condemn negations of the virginity of Mary. He promulgated Marian congregations and supported the rosary culture with 19 Papal bulls.

=== Clement X ===
Pope Clement X (1670–1676) furthered Marian piety with additional indulgences and privileges to religious orders and cities to celebrate special Marian feasts. He opposed the Marian piety of Louis de Montfort (canonized by Pope Pius XII) with a bull published on December 15, 1673, and outlawed some manifestations of Marian devotions. Several bulls supported the frequent reciting of the rosary.

== 18th century ==
=== Clement XI ===
Pope Clement XI (1700–1721) prepared the groundwork for the dogma of the Immaculate Conception. He permitted the title “Immaculate Conception” and instructed the Holy Office in 1712 not to persecute anyone invoking Mary using this title. The Feast of the Immaculate Conception, which existed only regionally, was prescribed for the whole Church. The Pope recommended the teachings and piety of Louis de Montfort and named him “Apostolic Missionary of France” On October 3, 1716, Clement XI extended the feast of Our Lady of the Rosary to the Universal Church.

=== Benedict XIII ===
Pope Benedict XIII (1724–1730) issued several indulgences in support of the rosary prayer, rosary processions and for praying the rosary on 15 “Marian Tuesdays”. He outlawed the Serafine rosary in 1727 and extended the feasts of Our Lady of Seven Sorrows and Our Lady of Mount Carmel to the whole Church.

=== Clement XII ===
Pope Clement XII (1758–1769) banned all Marian litanies except the Litany of Loreto. In 1770 he permitted Spain to have the Immaculata as the main patron of the country, and in 1767 he granted Spain the privilege of adding Mater Immaculata to the litany.

=== Benedict XIV ===
Pope Benedict XIV wrote books about the feast days of Christ and Mary – De festis Christi at BMV. He supported the Marian congregations for the Sodality of Our Lady with the bull Gloriosae Dominae, issued on September 27, 1748, and increased indulgences for all who pray the rosary.

=== Clement XIV ===
Pope Clement XIV (1769–1775) had to deal with popular unrest in Southern Italy regarding celebrations and processions of the Immaculate Conception. He granted a privilege to the Franciscans in Palermo that only they may celebrate the feast of the Immaculate Conception. Later he extended the privilege to other orders for private Masses only. He outlawed the brotherhood of the Immaculate Conception but confirmed a knightly order with the same name. Allegedly, he had promised the King of Spain to dogmatize the Immaculate Conception.

== 19th century ==
=== Pius IX ===
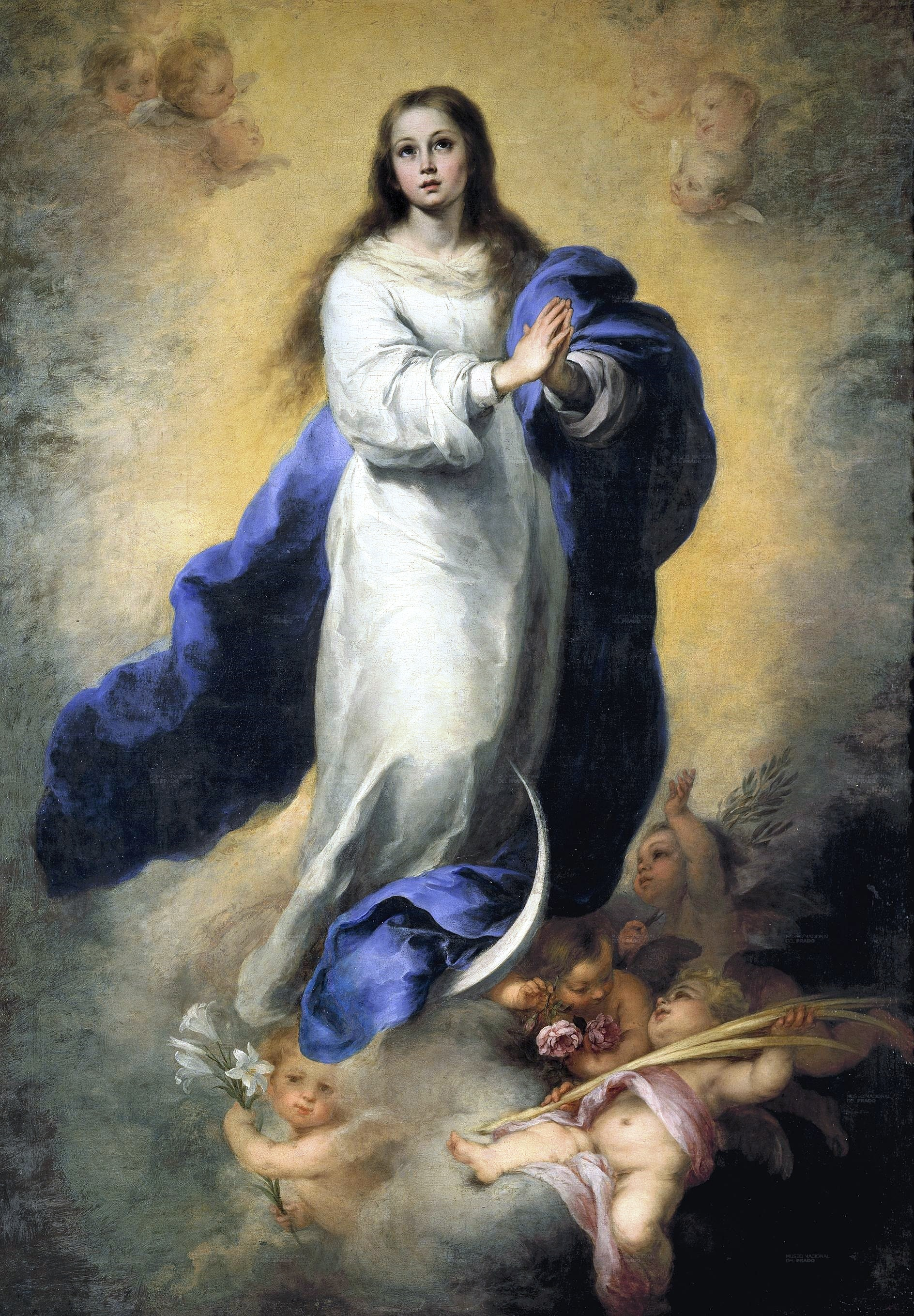
Pius IX dogmatized the Immaculate Conception in 1854. (Murillo, The Immaculate Conception of El Escorial, 1660–1665)

The Mariology of Pope Pius IX (1846–1878) represents a significant development of Roman Catholic theology, since it led to the promulgation of the dogma of the Immaculate Conception. Catholic theology in the 19th century was dominated by the issue of the Immaculate Conception of the Virgin Mary. During his pontificate petitions increased requesting the dogmatization of the Immaculate Conception. In 1848 Pius appointed a theological commission to analyze the possibility for a Marian dogma.

In 1848 the Pope had to flee Rome, when a revolutionary movement took over the Papal States and city government. From his exile in Gaeta he issued the encyclical Ubi primum, seeking the opinions of the bishops on the Immaculate Conception. Over 90 per cent of the bishops requested the dogmatization. Pius IX moved cautiously, on May 10, 1852, appointing a commission of twenty theologians to prepare a possible text of the dogma. Upon their completion, on December 2, 1852, he asked a commission of cardinals to finalize the text.

This influenced the eventual promulgation of the dogma of the Assumption. Pius IX's approach of seeking collegial consensus was quoted by Pope Pius XII, when in Deiparae Virginis Mariae he inquired of the bishops about a possible dogma of the Assumption of the Virgin Mary.

==== 1854 proclamation of the Immaculate Conception ====
It was not until 1854 that Pius IX, with the support of the overwhelming majority of Roman Catholic Bishops, proclaimed the Immaculate Conception. Eight years earlier, in 1846, the Pope had granted the unanimous wish of the bishops from the United States, and declared the Immaculata the patron of the US. During the First Vatican Council, some 108 council fathers requested to add the words "Immaculate Virgin" to the Hail Mary. Some fathers requested the dogma of the Immaculate Conception to be included in the Creed of the Church, which was opposed by Pius IX.

==== Rejection of a dogma of the Assumption ====
During the First Vatican Council, nine Mariological petitions favored a possible assumption dogma, but this was strongly opposed by some council fathers, especially from Germany. On 8 May the fathers rejected a dogmatization at that time, a rejection shared by Pius IX. Council fathers highlighted the divine motherhood of Mary and called her the mother of all graces.

Pius IX believed in the Assumption of Mary, and recognized the close relation between the Immaculate Conception of Mary and her being taken up into heaven. He resisted attempts, however, to issue a second Marian dogma within two decades. He attributed to Mary his narrow escape from Rome to Gaeta in 1848.

=== Leo XIII ===
In his encyclical on the fiftieth anniversary of the Dogma of the Immaculate Conception, Pope Leo XIII (1878-1903) stressed Mary's role in the redemption of humanity. His mariology was greatly influenced by Thomas Aquinas, especially his view of Mary's role in the Annunciation. Leo's emphasis on the path through Mary to Christ has been a key direction in Roman Catholic Mariology, with Mariology viewed as inherent in Christology, and the rosary paving that path.

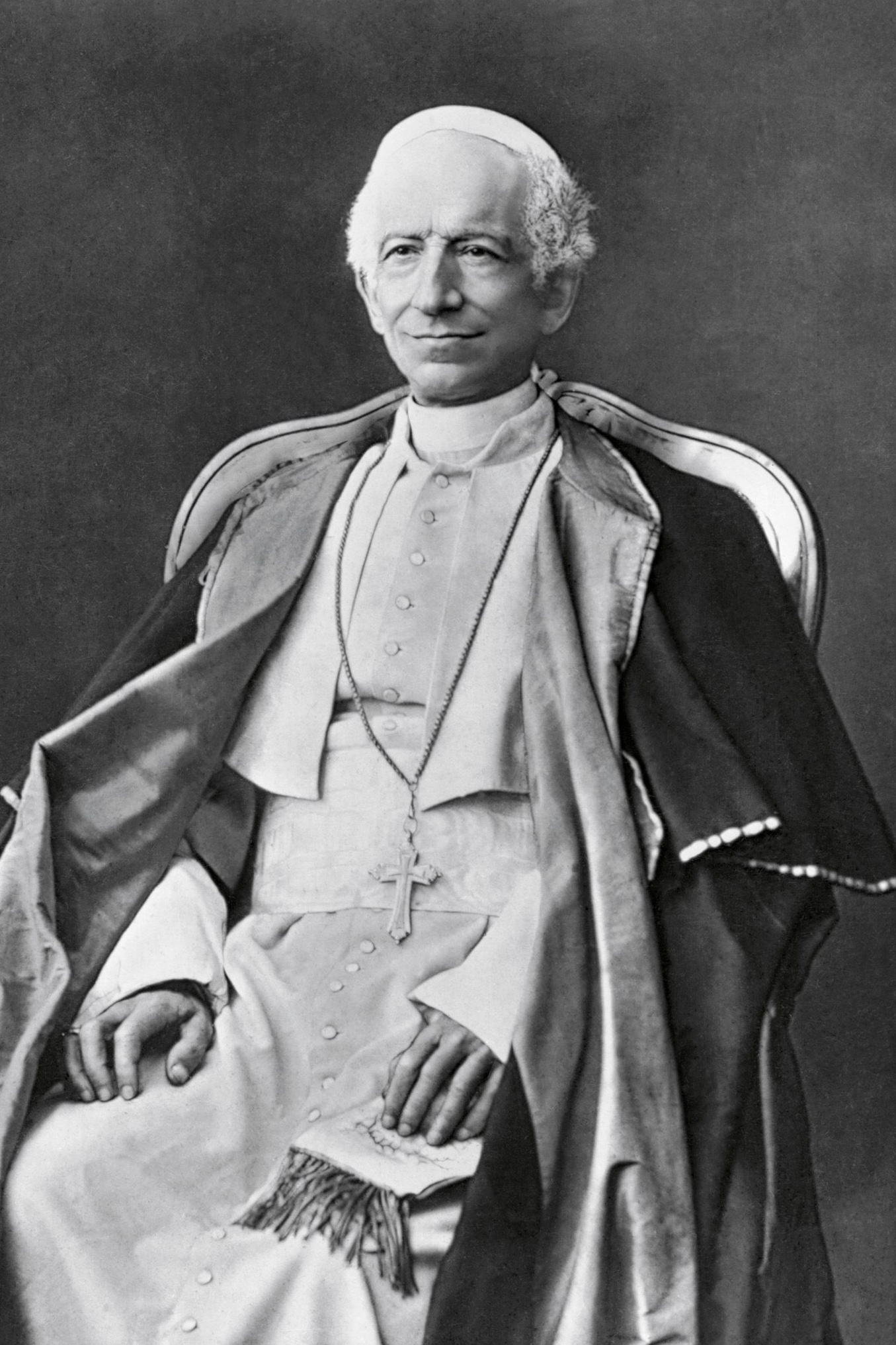
Pope Leo XIII

Pope Leo XIII issued a record number of encyclicals on the rosary, instituted the Catholic custom of daily rosary prayer during the month of October, and created in 1883 the Feast of Queen of the Holy Rosary. Leo XIII promulgated Marian devotions via twelve encyclicals on the rosary. A century after his death, Leo XIII is often quoted, most recently by Pope Benedict XVI and John Paul II.

He applied the Marian analysis of Louis de Montfort to the analysis of the Church as a whole. Leo actively employed his papal authority to support the veneration of Mary in places of her apparitions. Upon the blessing and opening of the Church of our Lady in Lourdes, he issued the apostolic writing Parte humanae generi supporting pilgrimages to Lourdes and other Marian shrines.

Leo XIII declared the Virgin of Montserrat to be the patron of Catalonia, and instituted the Feast of the Miraculous Medal in 1894. He condemned heresies about the Immaculate Conception and discussed the relation of Saint Joseph to Mary in the encyclical Quamquam pluries (August 15, 1889).

Leo XIII explained the importance of the rosary as the one road to God, from the father to the Son, to his Mother, and from her to the human race. The rosary is a vital means to participate in the life of Mary and to find the way to Christ.

==== Mediatrix ====
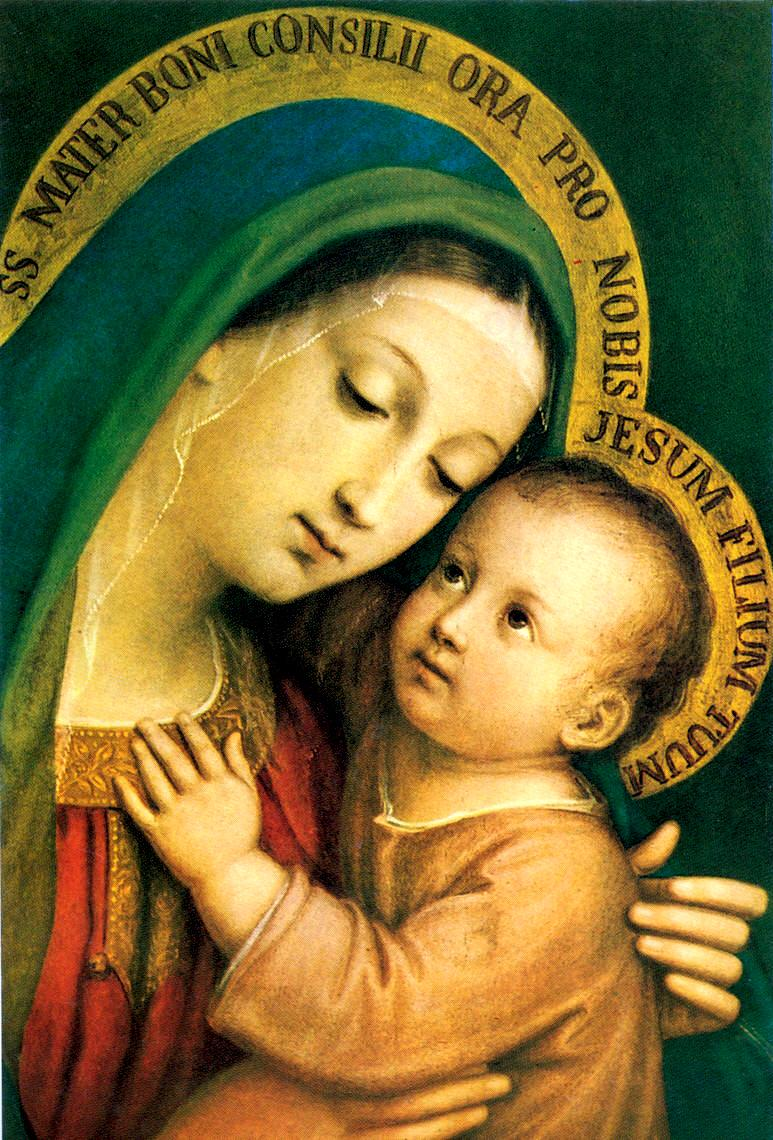
Leo XIII was devoted to Our Lady of Good Counsel, and included her invocation in the Litany of Loreto. This image is by Pasquale Sarullo, the original being in Genazzano, near Rome. Pius XII also placed his pontificate under the maternal care of Our Lady of Good Counsel and composed a prayer to her.

Leo XIII was the first Pope to fully embrace the concept of Mary as mediatrix. In his rosary encyclicals, he described the Virgin Mary as mediating all graces. In 1883 he wrote that nothing is as salvific and powerful as asking for the support of the Virgin, the mediator of peace with God and of heavenly graces. In his rosary encyclical Octobri Mense, he stated that Mary is administrator of graces on earth, part of a new salvation order.

In Dei Matris he noted that Mary is mediator because Christ the Lord is also our brother And in Jucunda Semper he stated that the deepest reason why Roman Catholics look for the protection of Mary through prayer is most certainly her office as mediator of divine grace. In Augustissimae Virginis Mariae, he wrote that calling on Mary is the best way to be heard by God, and to find God's grace.

From Thomas Aquinas Leo borrows the notion that Mary, in the hour of Annunciation, assumed the role of a helper in the mystery of redemption. Thus all Christians are born through Mary. With Jesus, Mary carried all in her womb. Therefore, all Christians are her children.

==== Scapulars ====
More than any other pope, Leo XIII, who was himself a member of the Pious Union of Our Lady of Good Counsel, was deeply attached to Our Lady of Good Counsel. The small Scapular of Our Lady of Good Counsel (the White Scapular) was presented by the Hermits of St. Augustine to Leo XIII who, in December 1893, approved it and endowed it with indulgences. On April 22, 1903, Leo XIII included the invocation "Mater boni consilii" in the Litany of Loreto.

During predecessor Pius's reign, the Scapular of Our Lady of Ransom was previously approved in 1868.

== 20th century ==
=== Pius X ===
Pope Pius X (1903–1914) promoted daily communion. In his 1904 encyclical Ad diem illum, he views Mary in the context of "restoring everything in Christ". Spiritually we all are her children and she is our mother. Therefore, she must be venerated like a mother. Christ is the Word made Flesh and the Savior of mankind. He had a physical body like every other man: and as Savior of the human family, he had a spiritual and mystical body, the Church. This, the Pope argues, has consequences for our view of the Blessed Virgin.

She "did not conceive the Eternal Son of God merely in order that He might be made man taking His human nature from her, but also by giving him her human nature, that He might be the Redeemer of men. Mary, carrying the Savior within her, also carried all those whose life was contained in the life of the Savior. Therefore, all the faithful united to Christ are members of His body, of His flesh, and of His bones from the womb of Mary like a body united to its head. In a spiritual and mystical fashion, all are children of Mary, and she is their Mother. Mother, spiritually, but truly Mother of the members of Christ"

=== Benedict XV ===
Pope Benedict XV (1914–1922) was an ardent Mariologist, devoted to Marian veneration and open to new theological perspectives. He personally addressed in numerous letters the pilgrims at Marian sanctuaries. He named Mary the Patron of Bavaria. To underline his support for the mediatrix theology, he authorized the Feast of Mary Mediator of all Graces. He condemned the misuse of Marian statues and pictures dressed in priestly robes, which he outlawed April 4, 1916.

During World War I, Benedict placed the world under the protection of the Blessed Virgin Mary and added the invocation Mary Queen of Peace to the Litany of Loreto. He promoted Marian veneration throughout the world by elevating twenty well-known Marian shrines such as Ettal Abbey in Bavaria into minor basilicas. He also promoted Marian devotions in the month of May in the spirit of Grignon de Montfort. The dogmatic constitution on the Church issued by the Second Vatican Council quotes the Marian theology of Benedict XV.

In his encyclical on Ephraim the Syrian he depicts Ephraim as a model of Marian devotion to our mother who uniquely was predestined by God. Pope Benedict did not issue a Marian encyclical but addressed the issue of Co-Redemptrix in his Apostolic Letter, Inter Soldalica, issued March 22, 1918.

As the blessed Virgin Mary does not seem to participate in the public life of Jesus Christ, and then, suddenly appears at the stations of his cross, she is not there without divine intention. She suffers with her suffering and dying son, almost as if she would have died herself. For the salvation of mankind, she gave up her rights as the mother of her son and sacrificed him for the reconciliation of divine justice, as far as she was permitted to do. Therefore, one can say, she redeemed with Christ the human race.

=== Pius XI ===
Pope Pius XI ruled the Church from 1922 to 1939. During his pontificate, a possible dogma of the assumption was being discussed. He granted France the patron "Our lady assumed into heaven patron". In 1930, he sent a papal delegate to the celebration of the house of Mary in Loreto, and in 1931, 1500 years after the Council of Ephesus, he issued a call to the separated Orthodox Church to venerate Mary together and to overcome the schism. In several apostolic writings he supported praying the rosary. In 1931 he instituted the feast of motherhood of Mary. Pope Pius XI liked to quote Bernard of Clairvaux: "We have everything through Mary".

=== Pius XII ===
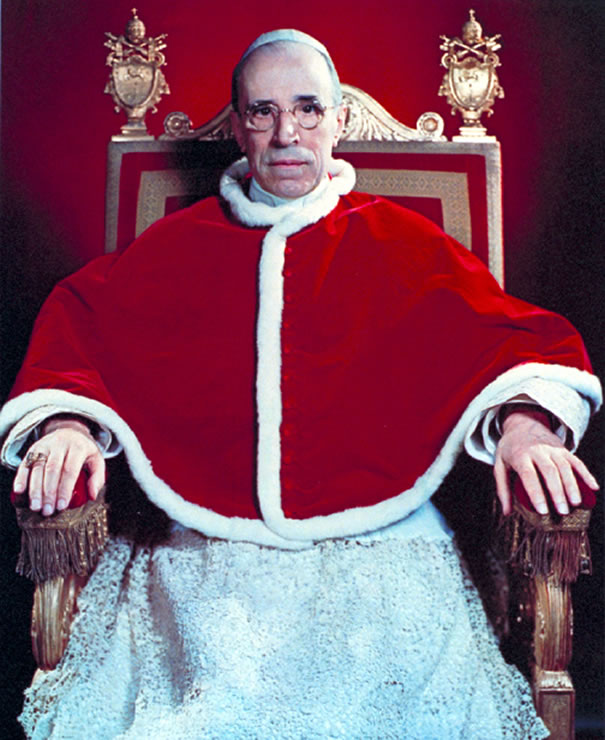
Pope Pius XII

Eugenio Pacelli was devoted to the Virgin Mary and as a young boy, two images in Rome received particular veneration: the Madonna Della Strada and Salus Populi Romani.

Pope Pius XII was called the most Marian pope in Church history. He placed his pontificate under the protection of the Virgin.

In the 1943 encyclical Mystici corporis, Pius XII speaks to the 1854 dogma of the Immaculate Conception promulgated by Pius IX. Mary, whose sinless soul was filled with the divine spirit of Jesus Christ above all other created souls, "in the name of the whole human race" gave her consent "for a spiritual marriage between the Son of God and human nature", thus elevating human nature beyond the realm of the purely material. Through her powerful prayers, she obtained that the spirit of our diviner redeemer should be bestowed on the newly founded Church at Pentecost. She is Most Holy Mother of all the members of Christ, and reigns in heaven with her Son, her body and soul refulgent with heavenly glory.

Many of the saints canonized by Pius XII were deeply devoted to Mary, such as Peter Chanel, Jeanne de Lestonnac, Pope Pius X, Catherine Labouré, and Anthony Mary Claret.

==== Fátima ====
Pacelli was consecrated archbishop in the Sistine Chapel by Pope Benedict XV on May 13, 1917, the same day as the first purported apparition of Our Lady of Fátima. His Secretary of State, Cardinal Luigi Maglione would later say that the Pope had been deeply moved by the parallel of his episcopal consecration and the apparition in Fátima. Referring to his episcopal consecration Pope Pius said:

At the same hour when the Lord placed the concern of the whole Church on our shoulders, at the mountain of Fátima appeared for the first time the White Queen of the Holy Rosary, as if the Mother of Mercy wanted to indicate, that in the stormy times of our pontificate, in the midst of the great crisis of human history, we will always have the motherly and vigilant assistance of the great conqueress, who would protect and guide us.

Cardinal Tedeschini, who was present at the consecration in 1917, added his view to the coincidence: "The pontificate of Pius XII is focused on Fátima, May 13. It was Our Lady of Fátima, who connected with the person and future of Eugenio Pacelli, having him consecrated through the hands of Pope Benedict XV to the fullness of priesthood at the very day and hour in which the Most Blessed Virgin with her messages first descended to Fátima. May 13 is engraved in all our hearts, how much more in the heart of this Pope.

On May 13, 1942, the 25th anniversary of the first apparition, and silver jubilee of the Episcopal consecration of Pope Pius XII, the Vatican published the Message and Secret of Fátima. In May 1946, he authorized his personal representative, Cardinal Masella to preside over a canonical coronation of the image of Our Lady of Fátima, in the Sanctuary of Fátima, Portugal. "The faithful virgin never disappointed the trust, put on her. She will transform into a fountain of graces, physical and spiritual graces, over all of Portugal, and from there, breaking all frontiers, over the whole Church and the entire world."

On May 18, 1950, the Pope sent a message to the people of Portugal: "May Portugal never forget the heavenly message of Fatima, which, before anybody else she was blessed to hear. To keep Fátima in your heart and to translate Fátima into deeds, is the best guarantee for ever more graces”

==== Marian year ====
With the September 8, 1953, encyclical Fulgens corona, Pius XII became the first Pope to call for a Marian year, a practice continued by John Paul II in 1987. Set for 1954, Marian year included initiatives in the areas of Mariology, cultural events, charity and social gatherings

==== Lourdes ====
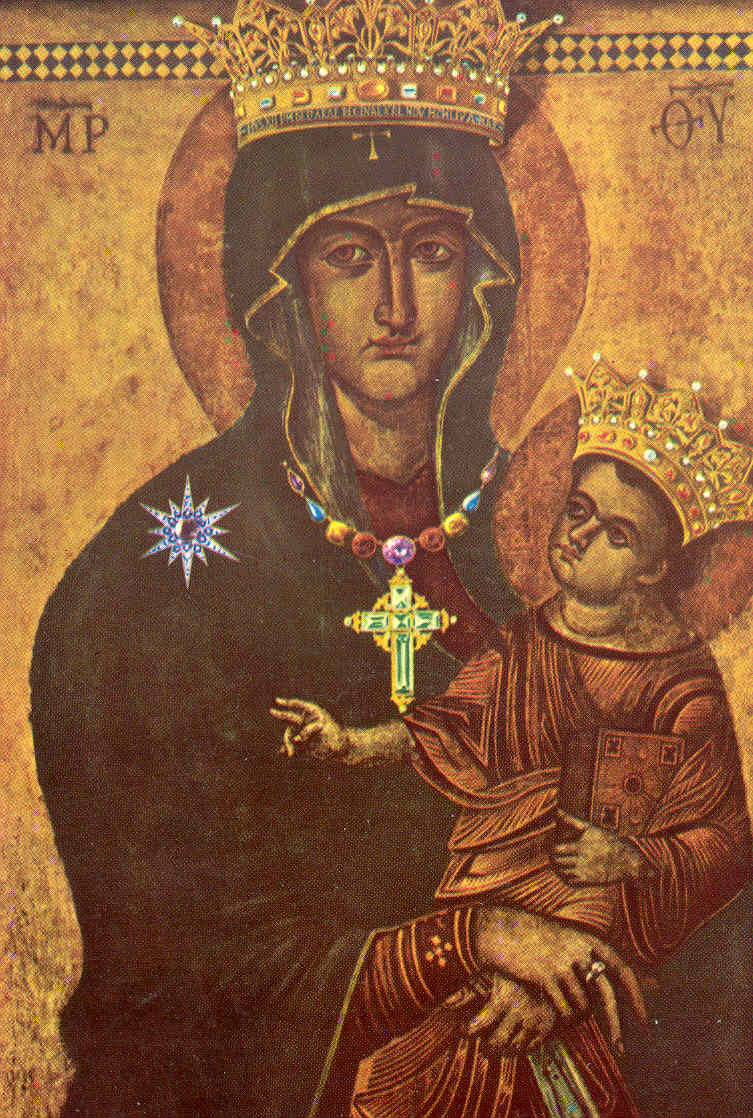
On April 1, 1899, Eugenio Pacelli said his first Mass at the Salus Populi Romani. Fifty years later, he crowned this picture for the Marian year 1954 as shown here.

The encyclical Le pèlerinage de Lourdes was issued on July 2, 1957. The encyclical represents the strongest pronouncement of the papal magisterium on Marian apparitions in the history of the Catholic Church. In it Pius recalls pleasant memories of the pilgrimage to Lourdes which he undertook while Papal delegate at the Eucharistic and Marian Celebrations in 1937. The Pope reminds the faithful of France that every Christian land is a Marian land and that ”there is not one nation redeemed in the blood of Christ which does not glory in proclaiming Mary its Mother and Patroness.” He then recalls the history of Marian veneration, the history of Lourdes and the contributions of the Popes to her veneration in Lourdes.

Christian families must remain faithful to their vital mission in society, and, consecrate themselves in this jubilee year to the Immaculate Heart of Mary. For married couples this consecration will be a valuable aid in their conjugal duties of chastity and faithfulness and keep pure the atmosphere in which children grow up.

"Professional and civic affairs offer a vast field of Marian action. Gathered at the Virgin's feet, and open to her teachings, self-searching will uproot any false judgments and selfish impulses. ...The quest for social and political peace among men is, above all, a moral problem, because no reform can bear fruit, no agreement lasting without a conversion and cleansing of heart. In this jubilee year the Virgin of Lourdes reminds all men of this truth."

Pius XII teaches that Mary looks upon some of her children with a special affection, the lowly, the poor, and the afflicted whom Jesus loved so much.

Go to her, you who are crushed by material misery, defenseless against the hardships of life and the indifference of men. Go to her, you who are assailed by sorrows and moral trials. Go to her, beloved invalids and infirm, you who are sincerely welcomed and honored at Lourdes as the suffering members of our Lord. Go to her and receive peace of heart, strength for your daily duties, joy for the sacrifice you offer.

The Pontiff states that the Immaculate Virgin knows the secret ways by which grace operates in souls. She also knows the great price which God attaches to sufferings, united to those of the Savior. The encyclical closes with a quote of Bernard of Clairvaux: "Amid dangers, difficulties, and doubts, think of Mary, invoke Mary's aid. ...If you follow her, you will not stray; if you entreat her, you will not lose hope; if you reflect upon her, you will not err; if she supports you, you will not fall; if she protects you, you will not fear; if she leads you, you will not grow weary; if she is propitious, you will reach your goal."

==== Consecration to the Immaculate Heart ====
On October 31, 1942, Pius XII consecrated the human race and later Russia to the Immaculate Heart of Mary.

The same day in a radio address he informed the people of Portugal about the apparitions of Fatima, consecrating the human race to the Immaculate Heart of the Virgin with specific mention of Russia. On December 8, 1942, the Pontiff officially and solemnly declared this consecration in a ceremony in Saint Peter Basilica in Rome.

The Consecration to the Immaculate Heart of Mary took place on October 31, 1942, just before major turning points in World War Two. Pius XII consecrated to Mary not only the Church but the whole human race, as "Father of Christianity", as representative of Christ, to whom "All power is given [...] in heaven and in earth" (atthew 28:18 ).At that time, German troops under General Rommel had conquered strategic parts of North Africa and were advancing towards the Suez Canal. In the Pacific, following Pearl Harbor, the Imperial Japanese forces occupied ever increasing territories, and Russia experienced an ever expanding German invasion. In this situation, Pope Pius XII, like his predecessors, put his trust in prayer. On October 31, 1942, he called for a prayer crusade to the Queen of Peace, and dedicated the whole human race and especially Russia to the Immaculate Heart of Mary.

In 1944, Pope Pius XII prescribed the Feast of the Immaculate Heart of Mary for the whole Church and placed his pontificate under the special patronage of the Virgin, In his Apostolic Letter of 7 July 1952, Sacro Vergente, Pius consecrated Russia to the Most Blessed Virgin Mary.

On May 1, 1948, in Auspicia quaedam, Pope Pius requested the consecration to the Immaculate Heart of every Catholic family, parish and diocese. "It is our wish, consequently, that wherever the opportunity suggests itself, this consecration be made in the various dioceses as well as in each of the parishes and families."

==== Mariology of Pius XII ====
The 1854 dogma of the Immaculate Conception by Pius IX defined the Virgin conceived without sin, as the mother of God and our mother. Pope Pius XII built on this in Mystici corporis, which summarizes his Mariology: Maria, whose sinless soul was filled with the divine spirit of Jesus Christ above all other created souls, "in the name of the whole human race" gave her consent "for a spiritual marriage between the Son of God and human nature", thus elevating human nature beyond the realm of the purely material. She who, according to the flesh, was the mother of our Head, became mother of all His members. Through her powerful prayers, she obtained that the spirit of our Divine Redeemer should be bestowed on the newly founded Church at Pentecost. She is Most Holy Mother of all the members of Christ, and reigns in heaven with her Son, her body and soul refulgent with heavenly glory.

==== Adoption of the dogma of the Assumption ====
In 1950 Pius XII defined the Assumption of Mary as an article of faith for Roman Catholic, the dogma of the assumption:

By the authority of our Lord Jesus Christ, of the Blessed Apostles Peter and Paul, and by our own authority, we pronounce, declare, and define it to be a divinely revealed dogma: that the Immaculate Mother of God, the ever Virgin Mary, having completed the course of her earthly life, was assumed body and soul into heavenly glory.

The dogma of the bodily assumption of the Virgin Mary is the crowning of the theology of Pope Pius XII. It was preceded by the 1946 encyclical Deiparae Virginis Mariae, which requested all Catholic bishops to express their opinion on a possible dogmatization. In this dogmatic statement, the phrase "having completed the course of her earthly life" leaves open the question of whether the Virgin Mary died before her Assumption, or, whether she was assumed before death; both possibilities are allowed. Mary's Assumption was a divine gift to Mary as Mother of God, and so also testimony to the divine nature of her Son.

==== New Marian feasts ====
Pope Pius XII instituted the feast of the Immaculate Heart of Mary in 1944 to be celebrated on 22 August, coinciding with the traditional octave day of the Assumption. (In 1969, Pope Paul VI moved the celebration of the Immaculate Heart of Mary to the Saturday immediately after the Solemnity of the Sacred Heart of Jesus.)

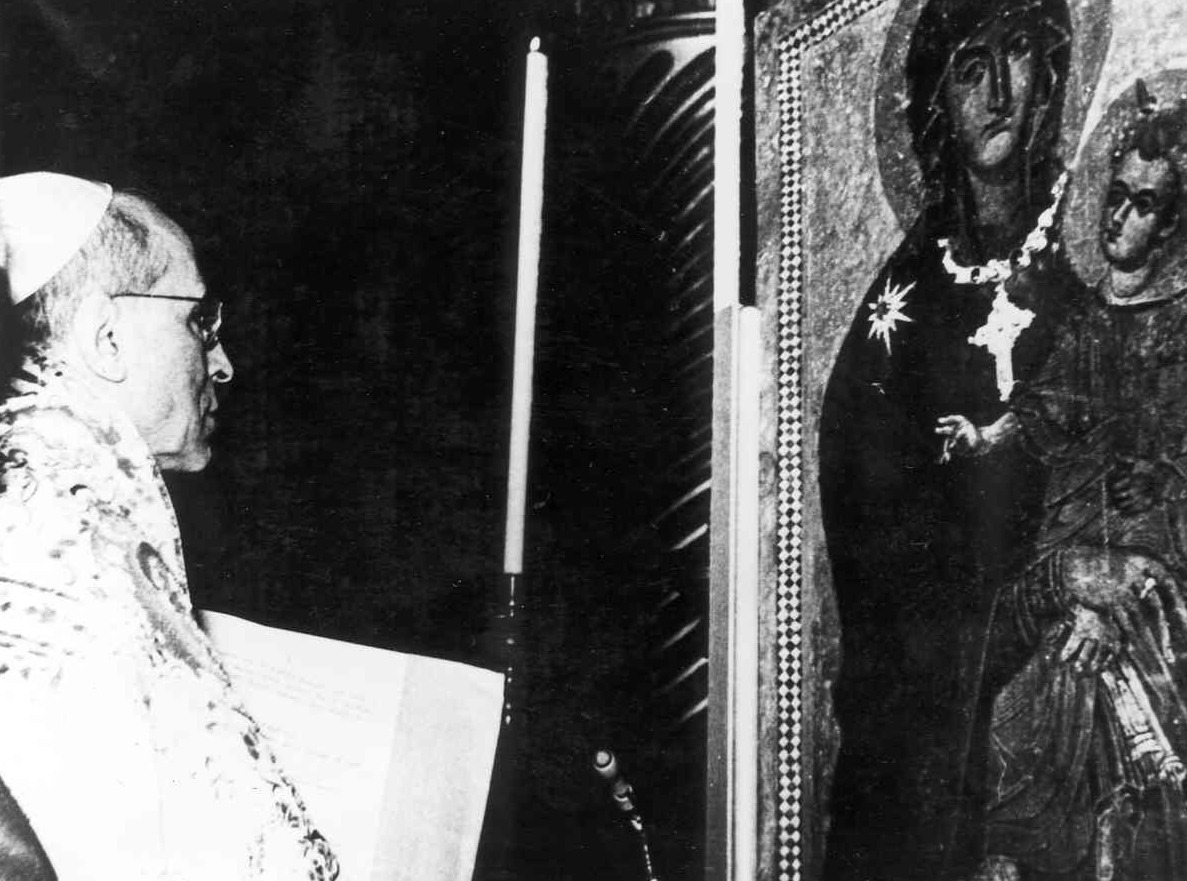
Coronation of the Salus Populi Romani icon in Rome by Pope Pius XII in 1954, in association with his announcement of new Marian feast for the Queenship of Mary.

In the October 11, 1954, encyclical Ad Caeli Reginam, he introduced a new Marian feast, the Queenship of Mary.

Assumed into heaven, so Pope Pius, "Mary is with Jesus Christ, her divine son. Mary should be called Queen, not only because of her Divine Motherhood of Jesus Christ, [her only son,] but also because God has willed her to have an exceptional role in the work of our eternal salvation." The encyclical argues, that Christ, because He redeemed us, is our Lord and king by a special title, so the Blessed Virgin also (is our queen), on account of the unique manner in which she assisted in our redemption, by giving of her own substance, by freely offering Him for us, by her singular desire and petition for, and active interest in, our salvation."

At the same time as he closely associated the celebrations of the Immaculate Heart of Mary and the Sacred Heart of Jesus, Pope Paul VI moved the celebration of the Queenship of Mary from 31 May to 22 August, bringing it into association with the feast of her Assumption.

==== Mariological writings ====
In several encyclicals and apostolic letters to the people of Poland and other countries behind the Iron curtain, he expressed certainty that the Blessed Virgin Mary would triumph over her enemies. On September 8, 1953, the encyclical Fulgens corona announced a Marian year for 1954, the centennial of the Dogma of the Immaculate Conception. Pope Pius XII left open the Mediatrix question, the role of the Virgin in the salvation acts of her son Jesus Christ. In the encyclical Ad Caeli Reginam he promulgated the feast, Queenship of Mary. Pius XII, having been consecrated on May 13, 1917, the very day Our Lady of Fatima is believed to have first appeared, consecrated the world to the Immaculate Heart of Mary in 1942, in accordance with the second "secret" of Our Lady of Fatima. (His remains were to be buried in the crypt of Saint Peter's Basilica on the feast day of Our Lady of Fatima, October 13, 1958.)

In 1950 and in 1958 he authorized institutions for increased academic research into the veneration of the Blessed Virgin Mary (see below). In 1953, Pope Pius ordered a Marian year for 1954, the first in Church history. The year was filled with Marian initiatives, in the areas of mariology, cultural events, charity and social gatherings. In his encyclicals Fulgens corona and Ad Caeli Reginam he presented a synthesis of the Mariology of the Church and warned against excesses and timid under-representation of the Catholic faith.

==== Mariological research ====
Pius strongly supported Marian research with the foundation or enlargement of a number of research centers in Rome. In 1950 and in 1958 he authorized institutions for increased academic research into the veneration of Mary. He supported or rewarded Mariological research of scholars like Gabriel Roschini, Raimondo Spiazzi, Otto Faller and Sebastian Tromp. Roschini was named head of the Marianum, Spiazzi and Tromp were asked to help write his encyclicals, Faller received a papal medal for his work. The research centers were:

- Academia Mariana Salesiana: he granted the foundation of the Academia Mariana Salesiana which is a part of a papal university. The academy supports Salesian studies with the aim of furthering the veneration of the Blessed Virgin in the tradition of John Bosco.
- Centro Mariano Montfortano: in 1950, the Centro Mariano Montfortano was moved from Bergamo to Rome. The Centro promulgates the teachings of Louis de Montfort, who was earlier canonized by Pius XII. It publishes the monthly Madre e Regina which promulgates the Marian orientation of Montfort.
- Marianum was created in 1950 and entrusted to the Order of Servites. It is authorized to grant all academic degrees including a doctorate in theology. Since 1976, every two years the Marianum organizes international conferences to find modern formulations which approximate the mystery of Mary.
- Collegamento Mariano Nazionale (1958) was the last Marian initiative of Pope Pius XII. It coordinates activities of Marian centres in Italy and organizes Marian pilgrimages and Marian study weeks for priests. In addition it started Marian youth gatherings and publishes the Journal Madonna.

Of these organizations, the Marianum is the most active Marilogical centre in Rome. This pontifical Catholic institute was founded by Father Gabriel Roschini (who then directed it for several years) under the direction of Pope Pius XII in 1950. At the Marianum, one can get a master's degree in Mariology (2-year academic program) and also a doctorate in Mariology. This Mariological facility has a library with more than 85,000 volumes on Mariology and a number of magazines and journals of theological and Mariological concern. Marianum is also the name of the prestigious journal of Marian theology, previously founded by Father Roschini in 1939.

=== John XXIII ===
On November 30, 1934, Angelo Roncalli was appointed Apostolic Delegate to Turkey. Archbishop Roncalli had the words Ad Jesum per Mariam inscribed above his chapel in the Apostolic Delegation in Istanbul as he believed that Mariology was the key to unity with the Orthodox; the Theotokos being the essential part of a common heritage. When asked, in the spring of 1954, for his opinion regarding the proposed new feast of the Queenship of Mary, Cardinal Roncalli responded that he felt it unnecessary, and from an ecumenical perspective counter-productive. For the same reasons, later as Pope, he declined a request for a dogmatic definition of the "spiritual maternity of Mary".

Suffering from stomach cancer at the end of his life, Pope John's meditation on the Assumption was deeply Christological. "The mystery of the Assumption brings home the thought of death, of our death, and it diffuses within us a mood of peaceful abandonment; it familiarizes us with and reconciles us to the idea that the Lord will be present in our death agony, to gather up into his hands our immortal soul."

=== Paul VI ===
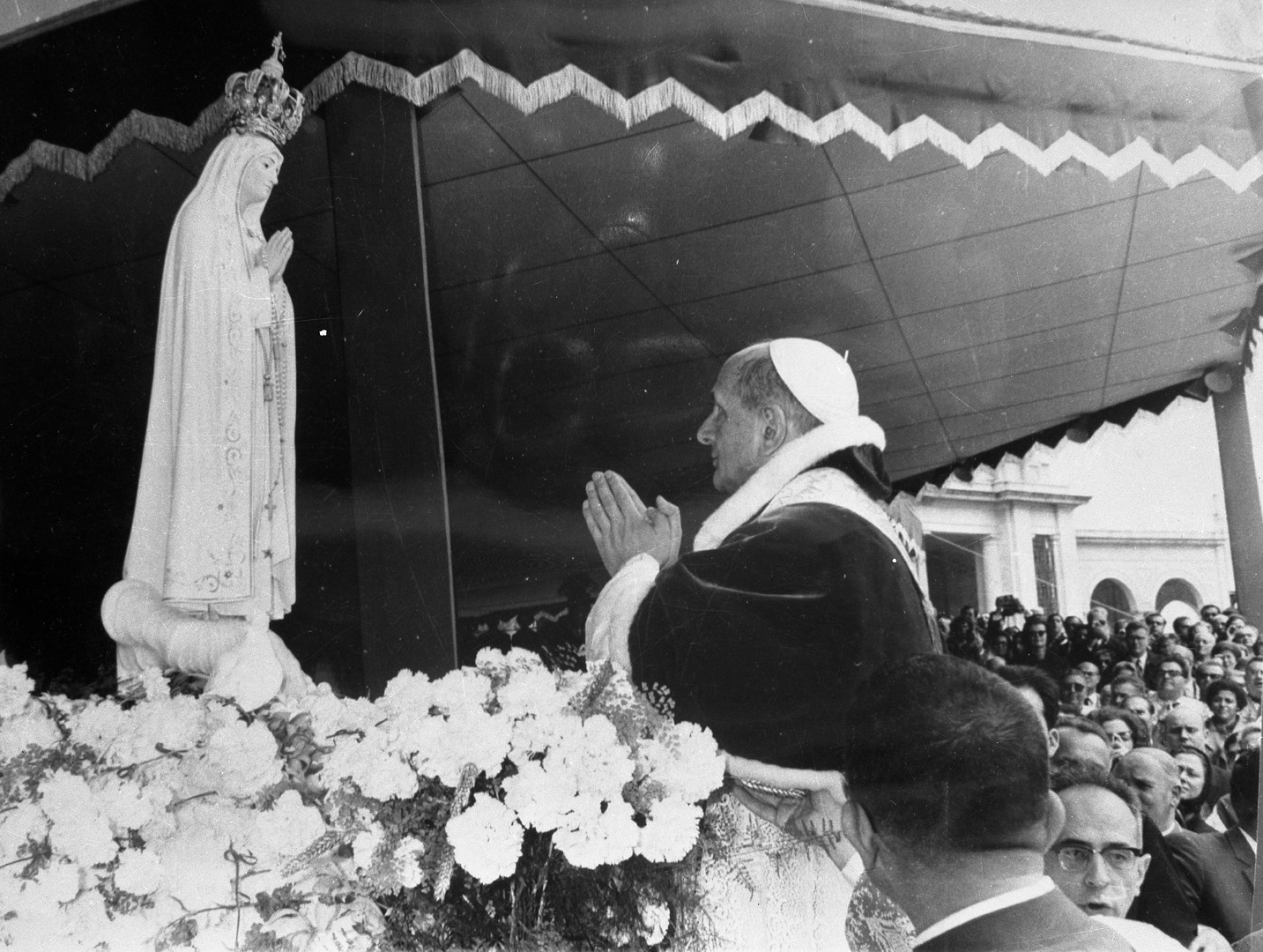
Paul VI during his visit to the Sanctuary of Fátima in 1967

Pope Paul VI (1963–1978) attempted to present the Marian teachings of the Church in view of her new ecumenical orientation. In his inaugural encyclical Ecclesiam Suam (section below), the Pope called Mary the ideal of Christian perfection. He regards “devotion to the Mother of God as of paramount importance in living the life of the Gospel.”

During his speech upon the closing of the third session of the Second Vatican Council on November 21, 1964, Paul VI proclaimed "Mary the Most Holy Mother of the Church, that is, the Mother of the whole People of God, both the faithful and the pastors." René Laurentin said that the Theological Commission had considered and rejected the title "Mother of the Church" not because they thought it was wrong, but because it was fatally prone to misunderstanding, and open to the suggestion that it appeared to place Mary outside the Church.

The encyclical Mense maio from April 29, 1965, focused on the Virgin Mary, to whom traditionally the month of May is dedicated as the Mother of God. Paul VI writes that Mary is rightly to be regarded as the way by which people are led to Christ. Therefore, the person who encounters Mary cannot help but encounter Christ. He writes that the Queen of Heaven is entrusted by God, as administrator of his compassion.

In his 1966 encyclical Christi Matri, he recommends the rosary in light of the Vietnam War and the dangers of atomic conflicts. The Queen of Peace and Mother of the Church should be invoked: "Nothing seems more appropriate and valuable than to have the prayers of the whole Christian family rise to the Mother of God, who is invoked as the Queen of Peace, begging her to pour forth abundant gifts of her maternal goodness in the midst of so many great trials and hardships. We want constant and devout prayers to be offered to her whom We declared Mother of the Church, its spiritual parent, during the celebration of the Second Vatican Council."

Paul VI taught that the rosary is a summary of gospel teaching. His new Missal includes all new Marian prayers. And in his 1974 exhortation Marialis Cultus, he again promotes Marian devotions, highlighting the Angelus and Rosary prayers. Mary deserves the devotions because she is the mother of graces and because of her unique role in redemption. On the fiftieth anniversary of the apparition in Fatima, Paul VI made a pilgrimage there, the first ever by a Pope. There, he linked the veneration of Mary to her role in the salvation of the human race.

=== John Paul II ===
John Paul II coat of arms with a Marian Cross

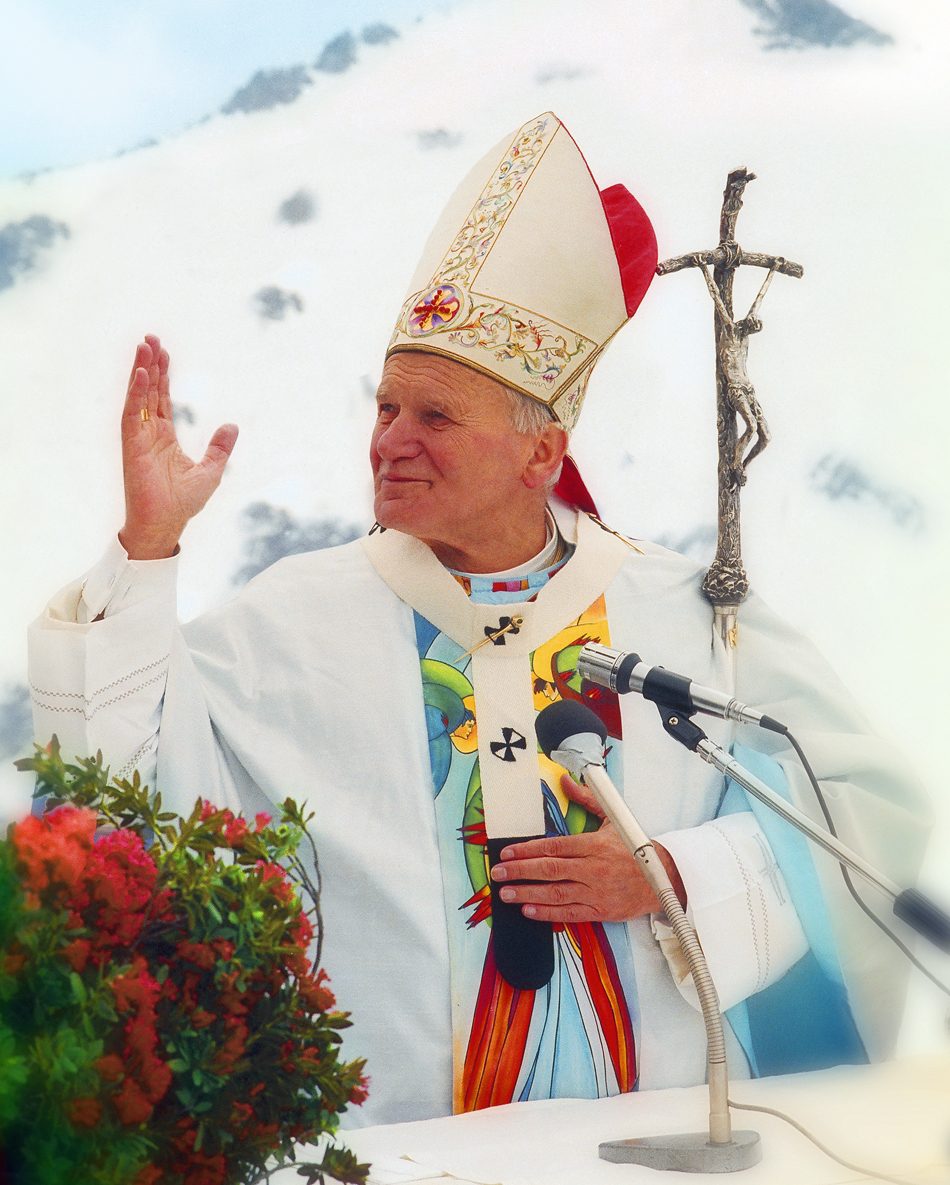
Pope John Paul II

The direction of the Catholic Church during the last part of the 20th century was dominated by the views of Pope John Paul II, whose perspective had a very strong Marian emphasis. And he deliberately reflected his Marian views within the design of his coat of arms by using a Marian Cross. According to L’Osservatore Romano, the use of the Marian Cross on his coat of arms was a departure from traditional heraldry models and was intended to emphasize the presence of the Virgin Mary under the Cross in Calvary and her special participation in the process of redemption.

As a young man, Karol Wojtyła was deeply influenced by the writings of the French priest Louis-Marie Grignion de Montfort; especially Montfort's True Devotion to Mary. Peter Hebblethwaite says that John Paul's Marian devotion is a combination of seventeenth-century French spirituality and Polish nationalism, where being Catholic is part of Polish identity and Mary is revered as the "Queen of Poland". Hebblethwaits suggests that this approach might resonate less outside of the unique Polish national experience.

John Paul II attributed his survival of an assassination attempt on May 13, 1981, (the Feast of Our Lady of Fatima) to the protection of Mary. A year later, he made a pilgrimage to Portugal in thanksgiving.

In the 1987 encyclical Redemptoris Mater and at a general audience on September 17, 1997, John Paul II reiterated the title Mary, Mother of the Church. The encyclical is a summary of modern Mariology, making some novel points. According to John Paul, the Mother of the Redeemer has a precise place in the plan of salvation.

If the greeting and the name "full of grace" say all this, in the context of the angel's announcement they refer first of all to the election of Mary as Mother of the Son of God. But at the same time the "fullness of grace" indicates all the supernatural munificence from which Mary benefits by being chosen and destined to be the Mother of Christ. If this election is fundamental for the accomplishment of God's salvific designs for humanity, and if the eternal choice in Christ and the vocation to the dignity of adopted children is the destiny of everyone, then the election of Mary is wholly exceptional and unique. Hence also the singularity and uniqueness of her place in the mystery of Christ.

The 2002 apostolic letter Rosarium Virginis Mariae of Pope John Paul II on the Rosary further communicated his Marian focus as he explained how his personal motto Totus Tuus was inspired by St. Louis de Montfort's doctrine on the excellence of Marian devotion and total consecration. In Rosarium Virginis Mariae, John Paul II quoted Louis de Montfort, and said:

Our entire perfection consists in being conformed, united and consecrated to Jesus Christ. Hence the most perfect of all devotions is undoubtedly that which conforms, unites and consecrates us most perfectly to Jesus Christ. Now, since Mary is of all creatures the one most conformed to Jesus Christ, it follows that among all devotions that which most consecrates and conforms a soul to our Lord is devotion to Mary, his Holy Mother, and that the more a soul is consecrated to her the more will it be consecrated to Jesus Christ.

== 21st century ==
=== Benedict XVI ===
Pope Benedict XVI continued the program of Pope John Paul II for a redirection of the whole Church to ensure an authentic approach to Christology via a return to the "whole truth about Mary". As Cardinal Ratzinger, he wrote:

It is necessary to go back to Mary if we want to return to that "truth about Jesus Christ," "truth about the Church" and "truth about man".

Ratzinger identified five passages from the New Testament as the biblical basis for the dogma of the Assumption of Mary: Ephesians 2:6 (in the book entitled God and the World: A Conversation with Peter Seewald, 2000); 1 Corinthians 15:21–25 (in the homily on the Assumption, 2010); Luke 1:45 (in the book Daughter Zion, 1977); Revelation 11:19 (homily of 15 August 2011); Revelation 12:1 (introduction to John Paul II's encyclical Redemptoris Mater and homily of 15 August 2007).

=== Pope Francis ===
In a homily, Francis compared Mary at the foot of the Cross with the mothers of prisoners he had met in Buenos Aires.

Like his predecessors, he spoke against the attribution of the title "Co-Redemptrix" to Mary.

== Mariological papal documents ==
Papal bulls

- Dominici gregis
- Ineffabilis Deus: established the dogma of the Immaculate Conception.
- Bis saeculari
- Munificentissimus Deus: it established the Assumption of Mary by Pope Pius XII.

Encyclicals

- Ad diem illum
- Deiparae Virginis Mariae 1948 Pius XII on the Assumption of the Blessed Virgin
- Ingruentium malorum
- Fulgens corona 1953 by Pius XII on centenary of the dogma of Immaculate Conception
- Ad Caeli Reginam 1954 by Pius XII on Queenship of Mary
- Redemptoris Mater
- Auspicia quaedam 1948 Pius XII on Marian prayers for peace

Apostolic letters

- Gloriosae Dominae
- Marialis Cultus
- Rosarium Virginis Mariae

== See also ==
- Roman Catholic Mariology
- History of Roman Catholic Mariology
- Mariology of the saints
- Protestant views of Mary

== Sources ==
- Michael Schmaus, Mariologie, Katholische Dogmatik, München Vol V, 1955
- Algermissen, Konrad; Böer, Ludwig, eds. (1957). Lexikon der Marienkunde. F. Pustet.
- Bäumer, Remigius (1989). Scheffczyk, Leo (ed.). Marienlexikon [Marian Lexicon] (in German). EOS-Verlag. ISBN 9783880968912.
- Graber, Rudolf (1954). Die marianischen Weltrundschreiben der Päpste in den letzten hundert Jahren [Marian Encyclicals of Popes in the Last Hundred Years] (in German). Würzburg, Germany: Echter-Verlag.
- Mariology Society of America https://web.archive.org/web/20170925082500/http://mariologicalsocietyofamerica.us/
- The Marian Library at University of Dayton https://udayton.edu/imri/mary/index.php
- Pope Pius IX, Apostolic Constitution
  - Apostolic Constitution Ineffabilis Deus
- Pope Pius XII, encyclicals and bulls
- Michael Schmaus, Mariologie, Katholische Dogmatik, München Vol V, 1955
- Stefano De Fiores, (Marianum) Maria, sintesi di valori. Storia culturale di mariologia. Cinisello Balsamo 2005;
- Stefano de Fiores, (Marianum), Maria. Nuovissimo dizionario. 2 Vols. Bologna 2006;
- Mariology Society of America https://web.archive.org/web/20170925082500/http://mariologicalsocietyofamerica.us/
- Acta Apostolicae Sedis, referenced as AAS by year.
- Pope Pius IX, Apostolic Constitution
  - Apostolic Constitution Ineffabilis Deus
  - Encyclical Fulgens corona on the Vatican website
  - Encyclical Ad Caeli Reginam on the Vatican website
  - Encyclical Mystici corporis Christi on the Vatican website
  - Apostolic Constitution Munificentissimus Deus on the Vatican Website
- Pope John Paul II, encyclical, apostolic letters and addresses
  - Encyclical Redemptoris Mater on the Vatican website
  - Apostolic Letter Rosarium Virginis Mariae on the Vatican Website
  - Pope John Paul II on Saint Louis de Montfort
  - Pope John Paul II, Address to the Mariology Forum
- Baker, Kenneth. Fundamentals of Catholicism, 1983 ISBN 0-89870-019-1
- Montfort, Louis de. True Devotion to Mary ISBN 1-59330-470-6
