= History of the Rosary =

Prayer rope used by Catholics

There are differing views on the history of the rosary, a Catholic prayer rope, cord or chain used to count specific prayers, commonly as a Marian devotion. The exact origin of the rosary as a prayer is less than clear and subject to debate among scholars. The use of knotted prayer ropes in Christianity goes back to the Desert Fathers in the 3rd and early 4th centuries. These counting devices were used for prayers such as the Jesus Prayer in Christian monasticism. The period after the Council of Ephesus in 431 witnessed gradual growth in the use of Marian prayers during the Middle Ages.

The practice of meditation during the praying of the Hail Marys was attributed to Dominic of Prussia (author of Liber experientiae 1458), a 15th-century Carthusian monk, who called it the "Life of Jesus Rosary" (vita Christi Rosarium). However, in 1977, a theologian from Trier named Andreas Heinz discovered a vita Christi rosary that dated to 1300, suggesting the origin of the current rosary extends back at least to that time.

In 1569, the papal bull Consueverunt Romani Pontifices established the devotion to the rosary in the Catholic Church. The Christian victory at the Battle of Lepanto in 1571 was attributed to the praying of the rosary by masses of Europeans based on the request of Pope Pius V and eventually resulted in a feast day for Our Lady of the Rosary (originally Our Lady of Victory). In 2002 Pope John Paul II introduced the Luminous Mysteries – based on a compilation by George Preca, the first Maltese saint – as an option in an apostolic letter on the rosary, Rosarium Virginis Mariae.

== Earliest antecedents ==
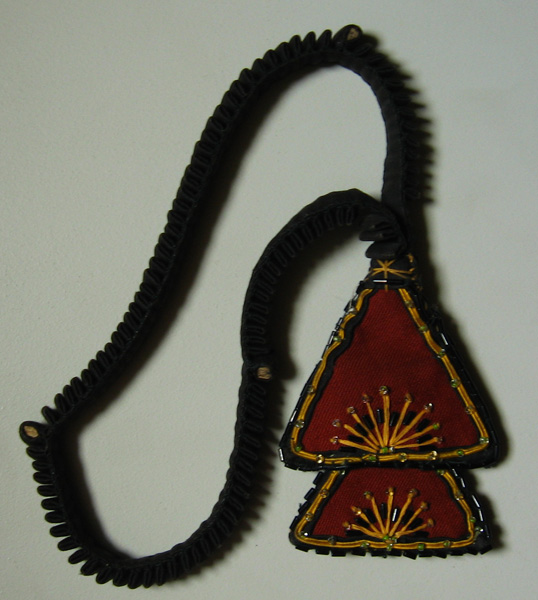
A Russian lestovka differs from a rosary in having no crucifix.

The earliest Christian devices for counting prayers trace to the Desert Fathers who started Christian monasticism in the 3rd century. They had the habit of praying 150 psalms a day and kept track of the count by putting 150 pebbles in a bowl or a bag and removing one after each psalm. Anthony of Egypt and Pachomius are often associated with the 4th century development of prayer ropes with 150 knots that gained popularity because each weighed much less than a bag of 150 pebbles. These ropes were only used for prayers to God, such as the Jesus Prayer and the Lord's Prayer, and involved no prayers to the Virgin Mary.

In Western Christendom, devout Christians used the Pater Noster cord to pray the 150 Psalms, which were recited daily by Christian monastics in the praying of the canonical hours. As many of the laity and even lay monastics could not read, they substituted 150 repetitions of the Lord's Prayer (Pater noster in Ecclesiastical Latin) for the Psalms, sometimes using a cord with knots on it to keep an accurate count.

After the First Council of Ephesus in 431, the title Theotokos and the veneration of Mary as the "Mother of God" were established and a period of growth for Marian prayers started.

== Middle Ages ==
During the Middle Ages, evidence suggests that both the Our Father and the Hail Mary were recited with prayer beads.

An Egyptian Coptic ostracon that dates to around the year 600 bears the Greek words: "Hail Mary full of grace, the Lord is with thee; blessed art thou amongst women and blessed is the fruit of thy womb, because thou didst conceive Christ, the Son of God, the Redeemer of our souls". This Eastern variant of the Ave Maria was apparently intended for liturgical use, just as the earliest form of the Hail Mary in the Western Church took the shape of an antiphon. However, there is little or no trace of the Hail Mary as an accepted "devotional formula" before about 1050. While two Anglo-Saxon manuscripts at the British Museum, one of which may be as old as the year 1030, show the words "Ave Maria" and "benedicta tu in mulieribus et benedictus fructus ventris tui", it is not certain when these clauses were first joined to make one prayer.

By the 7th century prayers to Mary were becoming more common. The earliest known prayer to Mary is the Sub tuum praesidium, which begins with the words: "Beneath your compassion, we take refuge." The earliest text of Sub tuum praesidium traces to the Egyptian Orthodox liturgy and a copy written in Greek dates to around the year 250.

According to a Dominican tradition, in 1208 the rosary was given to Dominic in an apparition by the Blessed Virgin Mary in the church of Prouille. This Marian apparition received the title of Our Lady of the Rosary. Most scholars agree that this version of events falls more in the realm of legend than that of history and that the rosary developed gradually over several centuries.

Around 1075 Lady Godiva refers in her will to "the circlet of precious stones which she had threaded on a cord in order that by fingering them one after another she might count her prayers exactly" (Malmesbury, "Gesta Pont.", Rolls Series 311)

It is recorded by a contemporary biographer that Aibert of Crespin, who died in 1140, recited 150 Hail Marys daily, 100 with genuflexions and 50 with prostrations. Louis IX of France (1214–1270) "knelt down every evening 50 times and each time he stood upright then knelt again and repeated slowly an Ave Maria." In the 12th century, the rule of the English anchorites, the Ancrene Wisse, specified how groups of 50 Hail Marys were to be broken into five decades of ten Hail Marys each. Gradually, the Hail Mary came to replace the Our Father as the prayer most associated with beads. Eventually, each decade came to be preceded by an Our Father, which further mirrored the structure of the monastic Divine Office.

In 13th-century Paris, four trade guilds existed of prayer bead makers, who were referred to as paternosterers, and the beads were referred to as Pater Noster cords, suggesting a continued link between the Our Father and the prayer beads.

The practice of meditation during the praying of the Hail Marys is attributed to Dominic of Prussia (1382–1460), a Carthusian monk, who called it "Life of Jesus Rosary". The German monk from Trier added a sentence to each of the 50 Hail Marys already popular at his time, using quotes from scriptures. Promoted by his superior Adolf von Essen and others, his practice became popular among Benedictines and Carthusians from Trier to adjoining Belgium and France. A rosary hanging from the belt often forms part of the Carthusian habit even today.

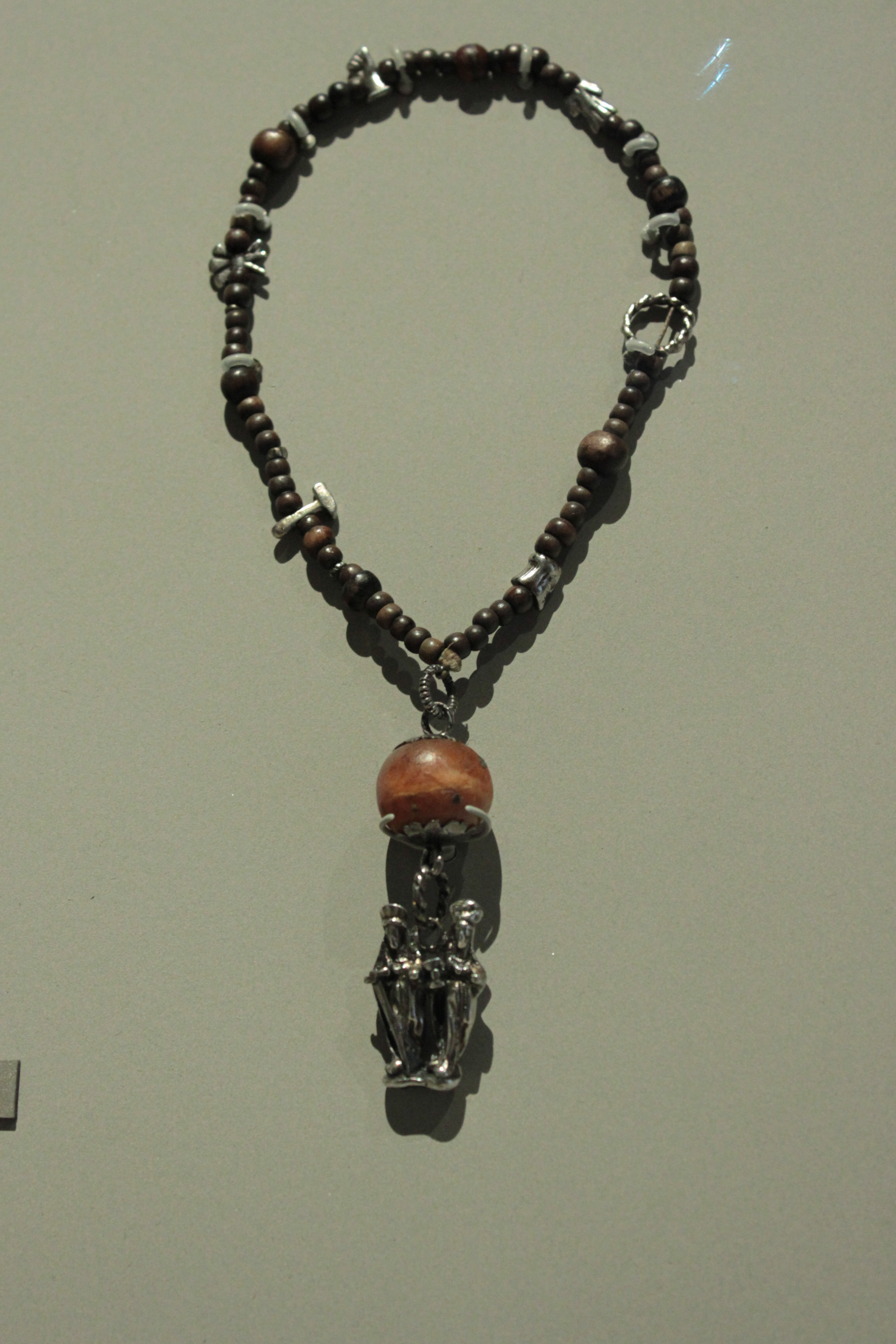
A rosary from 1475 to 1500, Germany.

In the 15th century Alanus de Rupe (a.k.a. Alain de la Roche or Saint Alan of the Rock), a Dominican priest and theologian, is said to have received a vision from Jesus about the urgency of reinstating the rosary as a form of prayer. Rupe also said that he received the Virgin Mary's Fifteen Rosary promises|15 Promises. Before his death on September 8, 1475, he reinstituted the rosary in many countries and established many rosary confraternities. Despite the popularity of Rupe's story about the origins of the rosary, there has never been found any historical evidence positively linking Dominic to the rosary. The story of Dominic's devotion to the rosary and supposed apparition of Our Lady of the Rosary does not appear in any documents of the church or Dominican Order prior to the writings of Rupe, some 300 years later.

It was greatly promoted by the preaching of the Dominican priest Alan de Rupe, who helped to spread the devotion in France, Flanders, and the Netherlands between 1460 and his death in 1475. He founded his first brotherhood for praying his Psalter in Douai in 1470. In 1475 James Sprenger formed one of the first rosary confraternities in Cologne. Rosary confraternities in Venice and Florence were formed in 1480 and 1481.

== Counterreformation to present ==
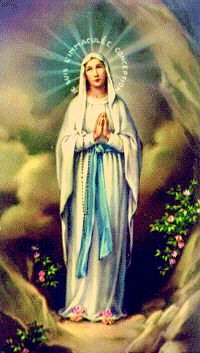
Our Lady of Lourdes appearing at Lourdes with rosary beads.

In 1569, the papal bull Consueverunt Romani Pontifices by the Dominican Pope Pius V officially established the devotion to the rosary in the Catholic Church. Peter Canisius, a Doctor of the Church, who is credited with adding to the Hail Mary the sentence "Holy Mary, Mother of God, pray for us sinners", was an ardent advocate of the rosary and promoted it (and its Marian devotion in general) as the best way to repair the damage done to the church by the Reformation.

In the 16th century, rosary confraternities for women spread in France and Italy, partly because women were excluded from most other societies and because this type did not involve common masses or processions, only private prayer. In 1571 Pope Pius V called for all of Europe to pray the rosary for victory at the Battle of Lepanto, in which the Christian belligerents included the Papal States. The Christian victory at Lepanto was at first celebrated as the feast of "Our Lady of Victory" on October 7, but was later renamed Our Lady of the Rosary.

From the 16th to the early 20th century, the structure of the rosary remained essentially unchanged. There were 15 mysteries, one for each of the 15 decades. In the 20th century the addition of the Fatima Prayer to the end of each decade became popular. After Vatican II, Msgr. Annibale Bugnini, architect of the liturgical reform, proposed further changes to the structure of the rosary, but Pope Paul VI refused to implement the proposal on the grounds that changing such a well-established and popular devotion would unsettle the piety of the faithful and show a lack of reverence for an ancient practice. There were thus no other changes until 2002 when John Paul II instituted five new Luminous Mysteries.

In the 17th century, the rosary began to appear as an element in key pieces of Roman Catholic Marian art. Key examples include Murillo's Madonna with the Rosary at the Museo del Prado in Spain, and the statue of Madonna with Rosary at the church of San Nazaro Maggiore in Milan. Several Roman Catholic Marian churches around the world have also been named after the rosary, e.g. Our Lady of the Rosary Basilica, in Rosario Argentina, the Rosary Basilica in Lourdes and Nossa Senhora do Rosário in Porto Alegre, Brazil.

== Key dates ==
Key dates in the development of the rosary include:

- c. 513 – "Hail Mary full of grace" prayer employed in a Syriac ritual attributed to Severus, Patriarch of Antioch
- 15th century – Alanus de Rupe (Alain de la Roche) established the "15 rosary promises" and started many rosary confraternities
- c. 1514 – Hail Mary prayer attains its current form.
- 1569 – Pope Pius V established the current form of the original 15 mysteries
- 1587 – Rosario della Sacratissima Vergine Maria by Ven. Luis de Granada is published.
- 1589 – Instructions for the use of the beades by John Bucke is published.
- 1597 – first recorded use of the term rosary to refer to prayer beads.
- 1917 – Our Lady of Fatima is said to ask that the Fatima Prayer be added to the rosary. Her visionaries state that she also asks for the rosary to be said to stop World War I.
- 1974 – Pope Paul VI issues the Apostolic Letter Marialis Cultus which devotes 14 sections to the use of the rosary within the Roman Catholic Church.
- 2002 – Pope John Paul II introduces the Luminous Mysteries as an option for Roman Catholics in an Apostolic Letter on the rosary, Rosarium Virginis Mariae.

== See also ==
- Catholic devotions
- Our Lady of the Rosary
- Rosary and scapular
- Rosary devotions and spirituality
- Komboskini – Similar prayer ropes used in Eastern Christianity
