= List of encyclicals of Pope Leo XIII =

1878–1902 papal encyclicals

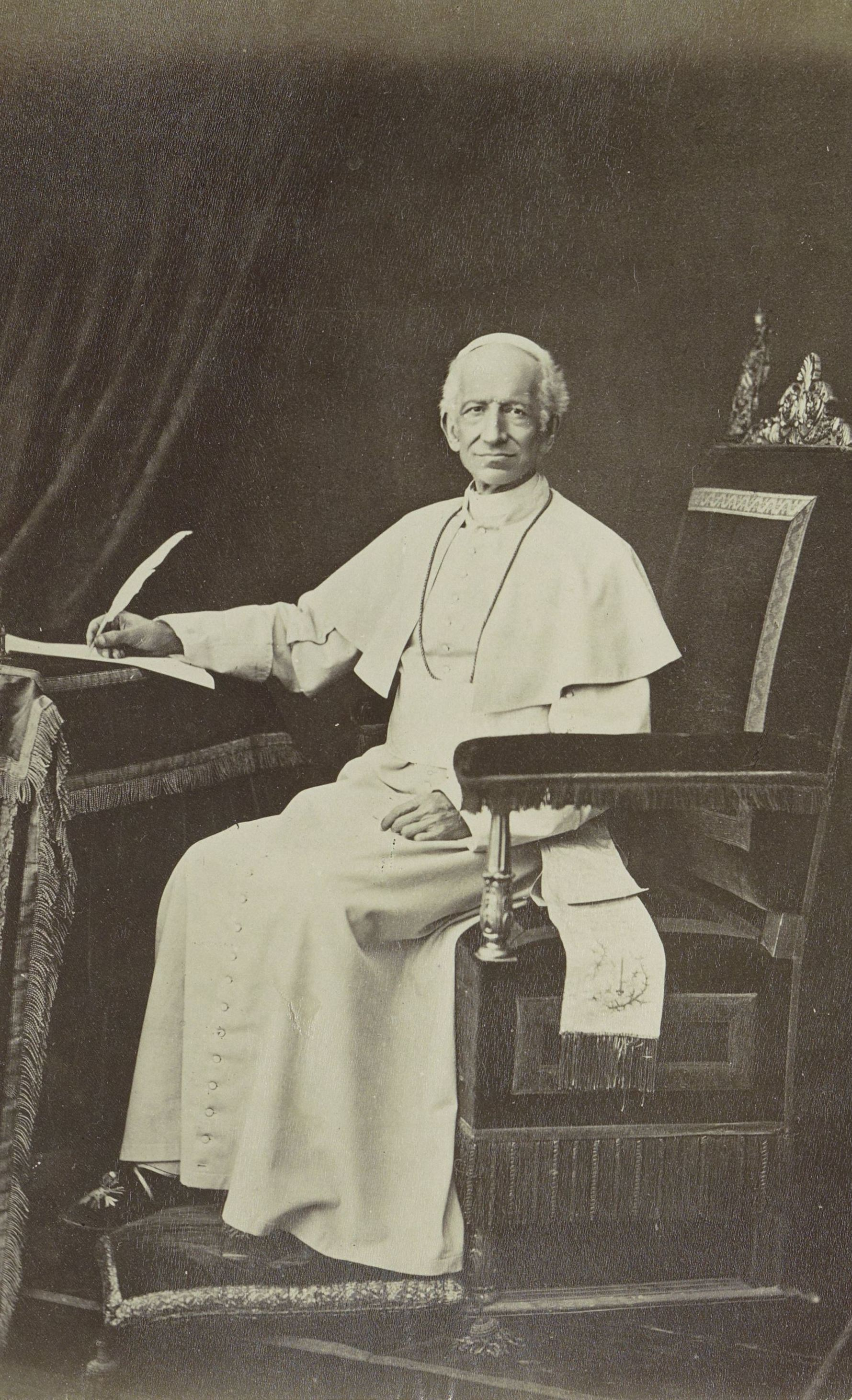
Pope Leo XIII in 1878

This article contains encyclicals issued by Pope Leo XIII during his twenty-five-year reign as Pope in 1878–1903.

| No. | Title (Latin) | Title (English translation) | Subject | Date |
|---|---|---|---|---|
| 1. | Inscrutabili Dei consilio | By God's Unsearchable Design | On the Evils of Society | 21 April 1878 |
| 2. | Quod apostolici muneris | Which Apostolic Duty | On Socialism | 28 December 1878 |
| 3. | Aeterni Patris | Of the Eternal Father | On the Restoration of Christian Philosophy | 4 August 1879 |
| 4. | Arcanum divinae | The hidden design of the divine wisdom | On Christian Marriage | 10 February 1880 |
| 5. | Grande munus | The Great Duty | On Saints Cyril and Methodius | 30 September 1880 |
| 6. | Sancta Dei civitas | The Holy City of God | On Mission Societies | 3 December 1880 |
| 7. | Diuturnum | Long-lasting | On the Origin of Civil Power | 29 June 1881 |
| 8. | Licet multa | Although Many | On Catholics in Belgium | 3 August 1881 |
| 9. | Etsi Nos | Even We | On Conditions in Italy | 15 February 1882 |
| 10. | Auspicato concessum | A Happy Circumstance | On St. Francis of Assisi | 17 September 1882 |
| 11. | Cum multa | With many | On Conditions in Spain | 8 December 1882 |
| 12. | Supremi apostolatus officio | The Supreme Apostolic Office | On Devotion to the Rosary | 1 September 1883 |
| 13. | Nobilissima Gallorum gens | The Most Noble People of France | On the Religious Question in France | 8 February 1884 |
| 14. | Humanum genus | The Human People | On Freemasonry | 20 April 1884 |
| 15. | Superiore anno | Last year | On the Recitation of the Rosary | 30 August 1884 |
| 16. | Immortale Dei | God's Immortal | On the Christian Constitution of States | 1 November 1885 |
| 17. | Spectata fides | Observed Faith | On Christian Education | 27 November 1885 |
| 18. | Quod auctoritate | Which by Authority | Proclaiming a Jubilee | 22 December 1885 |
| 19. | Iampridem | Long Ago | On Catholicism in Germany | 6 January 1886 |
| 20. | Quod multum | Which for Many | On the Liberty of the Church | 22 August 1886 |
| 21. | Pergrata | Most Pleasing | On the Church in Portugal | 14 September 1886 |
| 22. | Vi è ben noto | It Is Well Known to You | On the Rosary and Public Life | 20 September 1887 |
| 23. | Officio sanctissimo | The Holiest Office (or Duty) | On the Church in Bavaria | 22 December 1887 |
| 24. | Quod anniversarius | This Anniversiary | On His Sacerdotal Jubilee | 1 April 1888 |
| 25. | In plurimis | Among the Many | On the Abolition of Slavery (sent to the Bishops of Brazil) | 5 May 1888 |
| 26. | Libertas praestantissimum | Liberty, the highest | On the Nature of Human Liberty | 20 June 1888 |
| 27. | Saepe Nos | We Often | On Boycotting in Ireland | 24 June 1888 |
| 28. | Paterna Caritas | Fatherly Love | On Reunion with Rome | 25 July 1888 |
| 29. | Quam aerumnosa | How Troublesome | On Italian Immigrants | 10 December 1888 |
| 30. | Etsi cunctas | Although All | On the Church in Ireland | 21 December 1888 |
| 31. | Exeunte iam anno | Already at the End of the Year | On Right Ordering of Christian Life | 25 December 1888 |
| 32. | Magni Nobis | Great to Us | On The Catholic University of America | 7 March 1889 |
| 33. | Quamquam pluries | Although Frequently | On Devotion to St. Joseph | 15 August 1889 |
| 34. | Sapientiae Christianae | Of Christian Wisdom | On Christians as Citizens | 10 January 1890 |
| 35. | Dall'alto dell'Apostolico Seggio | From the Height of the Apostolic Seat | On Freemasonry in Italy | 15 October 1890 |
| 36. | Catholicae Ecclesiae | Of the Catholic Church | On Slavery in the Missions | 20 November 1890 |
| 37. | In ipso | In itself | On Episcopal Reunions in Austria | 3 March 1891 |
| 38. | Rerum novarum | New Things | On Capital and Labour | 15 May 1891 |
| 39. | Pastoralis vigilantiae | Of pastoral (things) | On Religious Union | 25 June 1891 |
| 40. | Pastoralis officii | Of the Pastoral Office | On the Morality of Duelling | 12 September 1891 |
| 41. | Octobri mense | The Month of October | On the Rosary | 22 September 1891 |
| 42. | Au Milieu Des Sollicitudes | Amid the Solicitudes | On the Church and State in France | 16 February 1892 |
| 43. | Quarto abeunte saeculo | The Fourth Century Having Past | On Christopher Columbus | 16 July 1892 |
| 44. | Magnae Dei Matris | Of the great Mother of God | On the Rosary | 8 September 1892 |
| 45. | Custodi di quella fede | Guards of That Faith | On Freemasonry | 8 December 1892 |
| 46. | Inimica vis | The Hostile Force | On Freemasonry | 8 December 1892 |
| 47. | Ad extremas | To the farthest | Seminaries for Native Clergy | 24 June 1893 |
| 48. | Constanti Hungarorum | The Hungarians' Loyal | On the Church in Hungary | 2 September 1893 |
| 49. | Laetitiae sanctae | Of holy praise | Commending Devotion to the Rosary | 8 September 1893 |
| 50. | Non Mediocri | | On the Spanish College in Rome | 25 October 1893 |
| 51. | Providentissimus Deus | The most provident God | On the Study of Holy Scripture | 18 November 1893 |
| 52. | Caritatis | Of Love | On the Church in Poland | 19 March 1894 |
| 53. | Inter Graves | Amdist Grave (Matters) | On the Church in Peru | 1 May 1894 |
| 54. | Praeclara gratulationis publicae | The Public Rejoicing's Splendid | The Reunion of Christendom | 20 June 1894 |
| 55. | Litteras a vobis | Your Letter | On the Clergy in Brazil | 2 July 1894 |
| 56. | Iucunda semper expectatione | Always with Delightful Expectation | On the Rosary | 8 September 1894 |
| 57. | Orientalium dignitas | The dignity of the Easterners | On the Churches of the East | 30 November 1894 |
| 58. | Christi nomen | The Name of Christ | On Propagation of the Faith and Eastern Churches | 24 December 1894 |
| 59. | Longinqua | Extensive | On Catholicism in the United States | 6 January 1895 |
| 60. | Permoti Nos | We, Influenced | On Social Conditions in Belgium | 10 July 1895 |
| 61. | Adiutricem | Adjutrix | On the Rosary | 5 September 1895 |
| 62. | Insignes | Eminent | On the Hungarian Millennium | 1 May 1896 |
| 63. | Satis cognitum | Sufficiently Well-Known | On the Unity of the Church | 29 June 1896 |
| 64. | Fidentem piumque animum | Confidence and Devotion | On the Rosary | 20 September 1896 |
| 65. | Divinum illud munus | That Divine Office | On the Holy Spirit | 9 May 1897 |
| 66. | Militantis Ecclesiae | Of the Church Militant | On St. Peter Canisius | 1 August 1897 |
| 67. | Augustissimae Virginis Mariae | Of the Most August Virgin Mary | On the Confraternity of the Holy Rosary | 12 September 1897 |
| 68. | Affari vos | Speak to You | On the Manitoba School Question | 8 December 1897 |
| 69. | Caritatis studium | Of the studies of charity | On the Church in Scotland | 25 July 1898 |
| 70. | Spesse volte | Many Times | On the Suppression of Catholic Institutions | 5 August 1898 |
| 71. | Quam religiosa | Which Religious | On Civil Marriage Law | 16 August 1898 |
| 72. | Diuturni temporis | Long Time | On the Rosary | 5 September 1898 |
| 73. | Quum diuturnum | When the Long | On the Latin American Bishops' Plenary Council | 25 December 1898 |
| 74. | Annum sacrum | A Holy Year | Consecration to the Sacred Heart | 25 May 1899 |
| 75. | Depuis le jour | Since the Day | On the Education of the Clergy | 8 September 1899 |
| 76. | Paternae | Fathers | On the Education of the Clergy | 18 September 1899 |
| 77. | Omnibus compertum | Everyone Knows | On Unity Among the Greek | 21 July 1900 |
| 78. | Tametsi futura prospicientibus | Although the Outlook on the Future | On Jesus Christ the Redeemer | 1 November 1900 |
| 79. | Graves de communi re | Grave Regarding General Business | On Christian Democracy | 18 January 1901 |
| 80. | Gravissimas | The Gravest | On Religious Orders in Portugal | 16 May 1901 |
| 81. | Reputantibus | Reflecting | On the Language Question in Bohemia | 20 August 1901 |
| 82. | Urbanitatis veteris | Of Ancient City-Living | On the Foundation of a Seminary in Athens | 20 November 1901 |
| 83. | In amplissimo | In The Greatest | On the Church in the United States | 15 April 1902 |
| 84. | Quod votis | Which Undertaking | On the Proposed Catholic University | 30 April 1902 |
| 85. | Mirae caritatis | Mirror of Charity | On the Holy Eucharist | 28 May 1902 |
| 86. | Quae ad nos | Which to Us | On the Church in Bohemia and Moravia | 22 November 1902 |
| 87. | Fin dal principio | Since the Beginning | On the Education of the Clergy | 8 December 1902 |
| 88. | Dum multa | While with Much | Marriage Legislation | 24 December 1902 |

== See also ==
- Apostolicae curae
