= Octobri mense =

Papal encyclical by Pope Leo XIII

Octobri mense Latin for 'The Month of October' Encyclical of Pope Leo XIII
- Signature date: 22 September 1891
- Subject: On the Rosary
- Number: 41 of 85 of the pontificate
- Text: In English

Octobri mense ([At the coming of] the Month of October) is an encyclical on the Rosary by Pope Leo XIII, also known as the Rosary Pope. It was issued on 22 September 1891 in Saint Peter's Basilica in Rome.

== Background ==
Octobri mense is the fifth of twelve encyclicals written by Leo XIII on the Rosary. Starting in 1883, all but two were issued in September in anticipation of October, the month dedicated to the Rosary. The subject of Octobri mense was the power of prayer and the efficacy of the rosary.

"It is indeed a cause of great sorrow that so many should be deterred and led astray by error and enmity to God; that so many should be indifferent to all forms of religion, and should finally become estranged from faith; that so many Catholics should be such in name only, and should pay to religion no honour or worship." Invoking Mary under the title Helper of Christians, Leo urges the faithful to have recourse to her.

"The Eternal Son of God [...] did not accomplish His design without adding there the free consent of the elect Mother, who represented in some sort all human kind, according to the illustrious and just opinion of St. Thomas, who says that the Annunciation was effected with the consent of the Virgin standing in the place of humanity."

St. Dominic’s devotion to the rosary is noted:

"… the devotion was begun and spread abroad by the holy Patriarch Dominic as a most potent weapon against the enemies of the faith at an epoch not, indeed, unlike our own, of great danger to our holy religion. The heresy of the Albigenses had ... overrun many countries, and this most vile off spring of the Manicheans [...] There seemed to be no human hope of opposing this fanatical and most pernicious sect when timely succor came from on high through the instrument of Mary's Rosary. Thus under the favor of the powerful Virgin, the glorious vanquisher of all heresies …"

In every September for the next seven years following the writing of Octobri Mense in September 1891, Pope Leo XIII dedicated the month of October to the Rosary through the authorship of an encyclical.

These encyclicals continued Leo's use of the Rosary as a rallying point against what he regarded as evils in 1892, 1893 and 1894.

== See also ==
- Christi Matri
- Laetitiae sanctae encyclical of 8 September 1893
- List of encyclicals of Pope Leo XIII
- Rosarium Virginis Mariae
