= List of encyclicals of Pope Leo XIII on the Rosary =

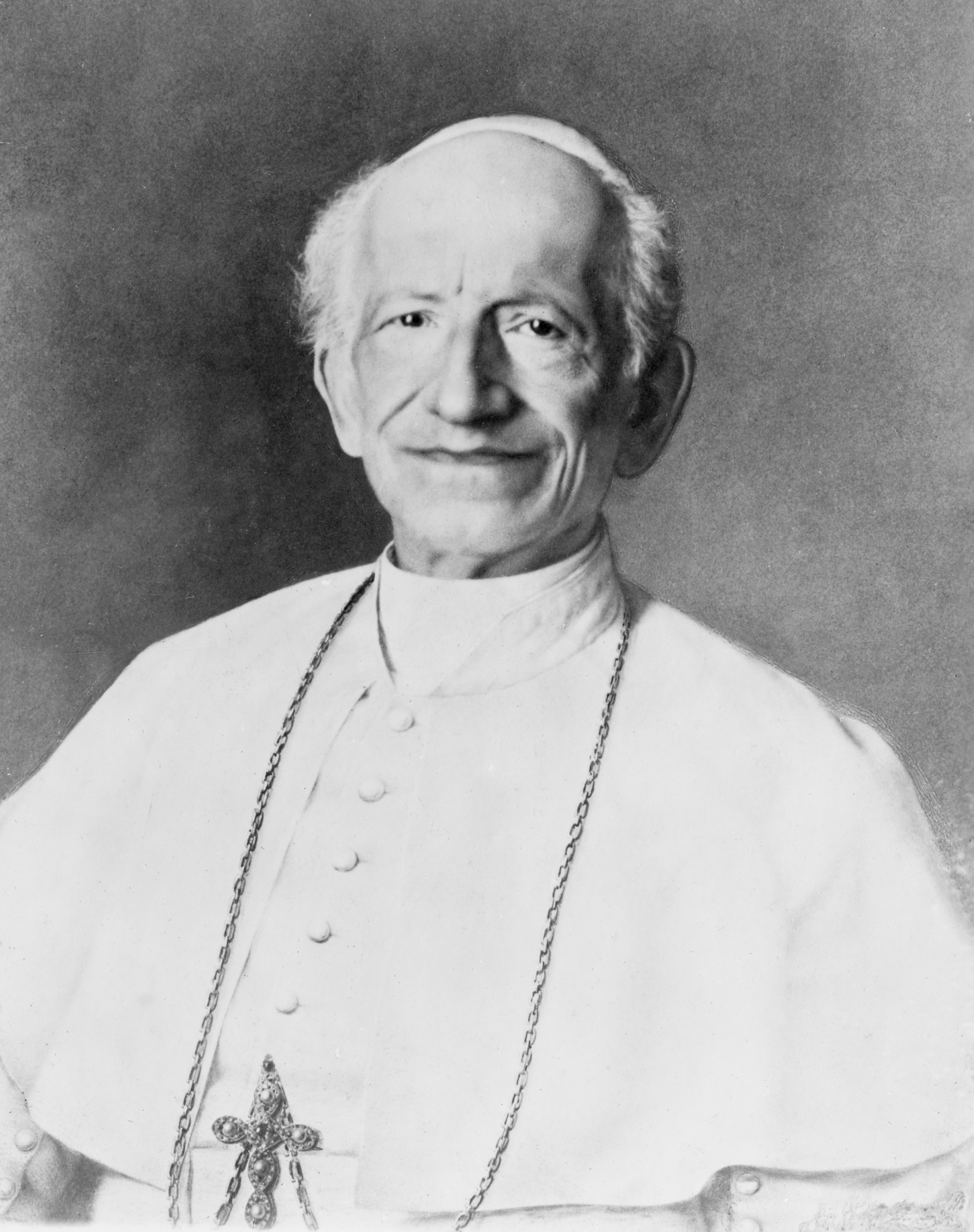
Leo XIII in 1898

During his pontificate, Pope Leo XIII wrote twelve encyclicals on the Rosary.

The first such encyclical was Supremi apostolatus officio of September 1883. Most were issued in September in anticipation of October, which Leo would have dedicated to Mary, in particular through the Rosary. The last one is Diuturni temporis. The first encyclicals established the rosary as a public devotion.

== List ==
The following 12 encyclicals of Leo XIII are about the Rosary:

1. Supremi apostolatus officio
2. Superiore anno
3. Quod auctoritate
4. Vi è ben noto
5. Octobri mense
6. Magnae dei matris
7. Laetitiae sanctae
8. Iucunda Semper Expectatione - The rosary as a testament to Mary's intercession
9. Adiutricem populi
10. Fidentem Piumque
11. Augustissimae Virginis
12. Diuturni temporis

== See also ==
- List of encyclicals of Pope Leo XIII
- Ingruentium malorum
