= Providentissimus Deus =

1893 encyclical by Pope Leo XIII

Providentissimus Deus Latin for 'The most provident God' Encyclical of Pope Leo XIII
- Signature date: 18 November 1893
- Subject: On the Study of Holy Scripture
- Number: 49 of 85 of the pontificate
- Text: In English

Providentissimus Deus, "On the Study of Holy Scripture", was an encyclical letter issued by Pope Leo XIII on 18 November 1893. In it, he reviewed the history of Bible study from the time of the Church Fathers to the present, spoke against the errors of the Rationalists and "higher critics", and outlined principles of scripture study and guidelines for how scripture was to be taught in seminaries. He also addressed the issues of apparent contradictions between the Bible and physical science, or between one part of scripture and another, and how such apparent contradictions can be resolved.

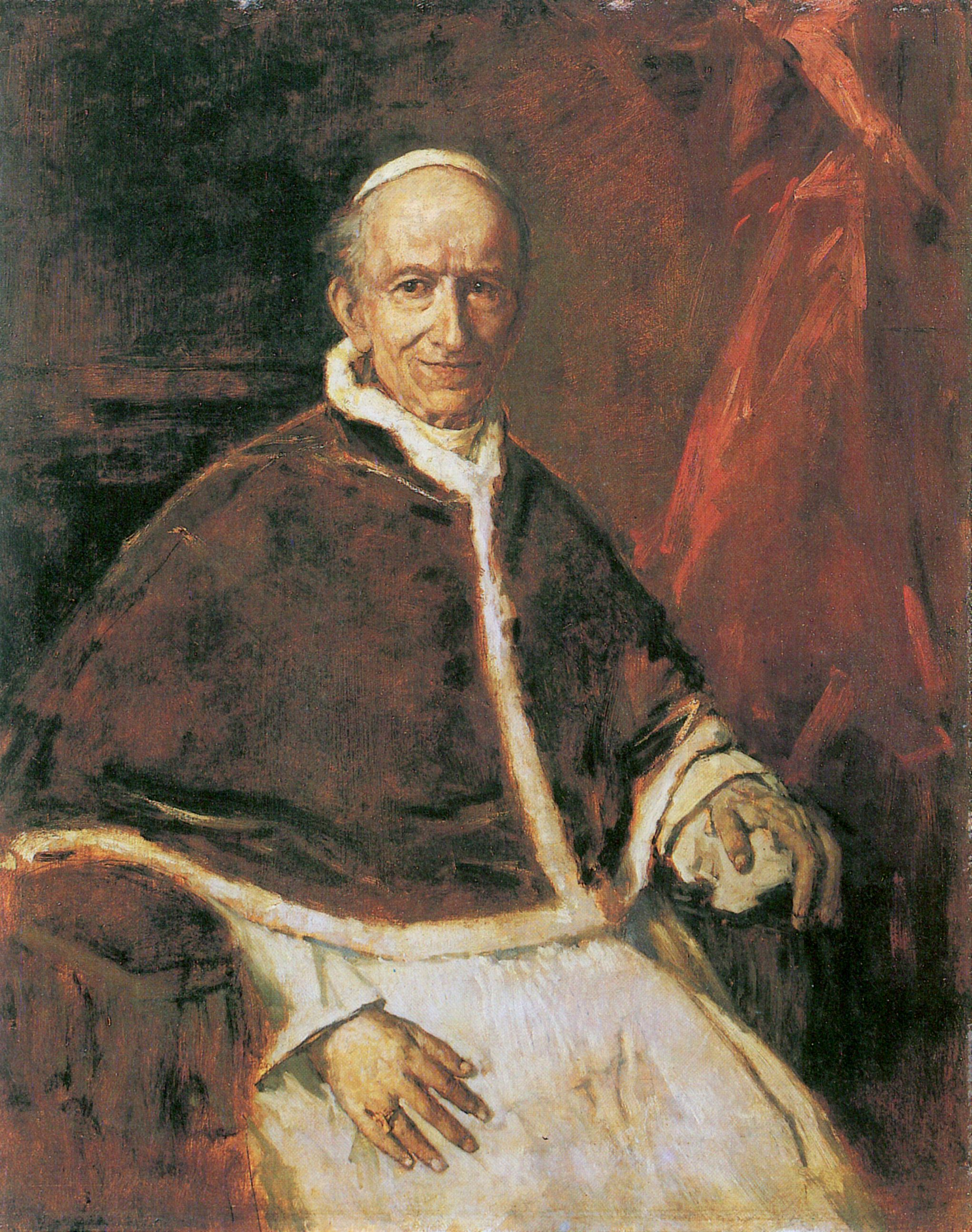
Leo XIII, 1885

== Context ==
Providentissimus Deus followed earlier efforts on the part of Pope Leo to promote Catholic education. In 1878, he had encouraged the study of history and archaeology. The 1879 encyclical Aeterni Patris promoted the study of scholastic philosophy. In 1887 he encouraged the study of the natural sciences, and in 1891 opened the Vatican Observatory.

Catholic studies in the seventeenth and eighteenth centuries avoided the use of critical methodology because of its rationalist tendencies. Frequent political revolutions, bitter opposition of liberalism to the church, and the expulsion of religious orders from France and Germany, made the church understandably suspicious of the new intellectual currents of the period.

In 1892 Leo authorized the École Biblique in Jerusalem, the first Catholic school specifically dedicated to the critical study of the Bible. At the turn of the 20th century the official Catholic attitude to the study of Holy Scripture was one of cautious advance, and at the same time of a growing appreciation of what had promise for the future. With Providentissimus Deus, Pope Leo gave the first formal authorization for the use of critical methods in biblical scholarship. In 1902, Pope Leo XIII instituted the Pontifical Biblical Commission, which was to adapt Roman Catholic Biblical studies to modern scholarship and to protect Scripture against attacks.

== Content ==
The encyclical contains both a polemic against rationalism, and a defense of divine authorship, inspiration, and inerrancy. Leo responded to two challenges to biblical authority, both of which arose during the 19th century.

The historical-critical method of analyzing scripture questioned the reliability of the Bible. Leo acknowledged the possibility of errors introduced by scribes but forbade the interpretation that only some of scripture is inerrant, while other elements are fallible. Leo condemned that use that certain scholars made of new evidence, clearly referring to Alfred Firmin Loisy and Maurice d'Hulst, although not by name. "[T]hose who maintain that an error is possible in any genuine passage of the sacred writings, either pervert the Catholic notion of inspiration, or make God the author of such error." Leo then quotes Augustine: "And if in these Books I meet anything which seems contrary to truth, I shall not hesitate to conclude either that the text is faulty, or that the translator has not expressed the meaning of the passage, or that I myself do not understand."

"But he must not on that account consider that it is forbidden, when just cause exists, to push inquiry and exposition beyond what the Fathers have done; provided he carefully observes the rule so wisely laid down by St. Augustine-not to depart from the literal and obvious sense, except only where reason makes it untenable or necessity requires./" Leo argued that as science and theology are separate disciplines they do not contradict each other, provided that scholars keep to their respective areas of expertise. The scientist should not view the biblical writers as explaining the visible world, as that was not their intent. Biblical scholars should be aware that the writers may have used figurative language or descriptions from appearances. Leo endorsed the study of the Oriental languages and of the art of criticism. "...[I]t is most proper that Professors of Sacred Scripture and theologians should master those tongues in which the sacred Books were originally written; …"

At first, both conservatives and liberals found elements in the encyclical to which to appeal. Over the next decade, however, Modernism spread and the encyclical was increasingly interpreted in a conservative sense. This encyclical was part of an ongoing conflict between Modernists and conservatives.

== Divino Afflante Spiritu ==
On September 30, 1943, Pope Pius XII issued his encyclical on “The Most Opportune Way to Promote Biblical Studies,” Divino Afflante Spiritu (“Inspired by the Divine Spirit”), in commemoration of Providentissimus Deus.

== See also ==
- Divino afflante Spiritu – Pius XII on study of scripture
- List of encyclicals of Pope Leo XIII
- Laetitiae sanctae
- Fundamentalist–Modernist controversy – Similar debates about critical biblical scholarship in the Presbyterian Church in the United States of America
- Biblical criticism § Catholic criticism – A history of Catholic attitudes toward biblical criticism
