= Consueverunt Romani Pontifices =

1569 papal bull by Pope Pius V on the rosary

Consueverunt Romani Pontifices Papal bull of Pope Pius V
- Signature date: 17 September 1569
- Subject: On the rosary
- Text: In English

Consueverunt Romani Pontifices is a papal bull by Pope Pius V, issued on 17 September 1569, on the rosary. This papal bull instituted the essence of the rosary's present configuration.

The Pope made it clear that there are two essential elements of the Rosary: vocal prayer and mental prayer.

The papal bull refers to the Dominican roots of the Rosary and to the fact that as a young friar, Pope Pius V had been a member of the Dominican Order:

And so Dominic looked to that simple way of praying and beseeching God, accessible to all and wholly pious, which is called the Rosary, or Psalter of the Blessed Virgin Mary, in which the same most Blessed Virgin is venerated by the angelic greeting repeated one hundred and fifty times, that is, according to the number of the Davidic Psalter, and by the Lord's Prayer with each decade. Interposed with these prayers are certain meditations showing forth the entire life of Our Lord Jesus Christ, thus completing the method of prayer devised by the Fathers of the Holy Roman Church.

In this papal bull Pius V also confirmed the indults and indulgences that his predecessors had granted to those who pray the Rosary.

This 1569 document is distinct from an Apostolic Letter with the same title issued in November 2000, which declared the St. Giles church in Bardejov, Slovakia, a basilica minor.

== See also ==
- Augustissimae Virginis Mariae – Pope Leo XIII on the Confraternity of the Holy Rosary
- Rosarium Virginis Mariae – Pope John Paul II on the rosary
