= Cum multa =

Papal encyclical by Pope Leo XIII

Cum multa Latin for 'With many' Encyclical of Pope Leo XIII
- Signature date: 8 December 1882
- Subject: On conditions in Spain
- Number: 11 of 85 of the pontificate
- Text: In English

Cum multa (lit. 'With many') is an encyclical issued by Pope Leo XIII on December 8, 1882, in which he gives some instructions to Spanish Catholics. It is composed of 20 points which deals with several aspects:

- (1-2) Introduction.
- (3-5) The Necessity of Union Amongst Catholics.
- (6-9) The Relations Between Religion and Politics.
- (10-11) The Authority of Bishops and the Respect Due to Them.
- (12-13) The Clergy and Political Parties.
- (14) Rules Which Should Guide Catholic Associations.
- (15) And for the Conduct of the Catholic Press.
- (16-20) End.

== See also ==
- List of encyclicals of Pope Leo XIII
