= Augustissimae Virginis Mariae =

Papal encyclical by Pope Leo XIII

Augustissimae Virginis Mariae Latin for 'The Most August Virgin Mary' Encyclical of Pope Leo XIII
- Signature date: 12 September 1897
- Subject: On the Confraternity of the Holy Rosary
- Number: 63 of 85 of the pontificate
- Text: In English

Augustissimae Virginis Mariae (English: The Most August Virgin Mary) is an encyclical by Pope Leo XIII. It was issued 12 September 1897 in Saint Peter's Basilica in Rome and encouraged faithful Catholics to enroll in the Confraternity of the Holy Rosary.

== Benefit of pious associations ==
While recognizing the natural tendency of people to associate in groups of like-minded interests, he notes the beneficial usefulness of various Catholic associations. Among these, however, he gives prominence to the Rosary Sodality. "Everyone knows how necessary prayer is for all men; not that God's decrees can be changed, but, as St. Gregory says, 'that men by asking may merit to receive what Almighty God hath decreed from eternity to grant them.'"

"We are taught by the Catholic faith that we may pray not only to God himself, but also to the Blessed in heaven (Conc. Trid. Sess. xxv.), though in different manner; because we ask from God as from the Source of all good, but from the Saints as from intercessors. [...] Wherefore, it is said in the Apocalypse (viii.,4): 'The smoke of the incense of the prayers of the Saints ascended up before God from the hand of the angel' (Summa Theol. 2a tae, q. lxxxiii. a. iv.). [...] Now, of all the blessed in heaven, who can compare with the august Mother of God in obtaining grace? ...For, so great is her dignity, so great her favour before God, that whosoever in his need will not have recourse to her is trying to fly without wings.

Leo also likens concerted communal prayer to the office of the angels. "With what confidence may we not hope that those who on earth have united with the Angels in this ministry will one day enjoy their blessed company in Heaven?"

In Augustissimae Virginis, Leo contrasted the growth of the society devoted to the Rosary, the Confraternity of the Holy Rosary, versus the evil societies of his time, the Socialists and Freemasons:

"The natural tendency of man to association has never been stronger, or more earnestly and generally followed, than in our own age. This is not at all to be reprehended, unless when so excellent a natural tendency is perverted to evil purposes, and wicked men, banding together in various forms of societies, conspire 'against the Lord and against His Christ' (Ps ii., 2). It is, however, most gratifying to observe that pious associations are becoming more and more popular among Catholics also [...]. We do not hesitate to assign a pre-eminent place among these societies to that known as the Society of the Holy Rosary. If we regard its origin, we find it distinguished by its antiquity, for St. Dominic himself is said to have been its founder."

== See also ==
- List of encyclicals of Pope Leo XIII
- Mariology of Pope Leo XIII
- List of encyclicals of Pope Leo XIII on the Rosary

== Sources ==
- "Augustissimae Virginis Mariae at the Vatican website". www.vatican.va.
