= Laetitiae sanctae =

Papal encyclical by Pope Leo XIII

Laetitiae sanctae Latin for 'Of holy joy' Encyclical of Pope Leo XIII
- Signature date: 8 September 1893
- Subject: Commending Devotion to the Rosary
- Number: 48 of 85 of the pontificate
- Text: In English

Laetitiae sanctae is an encyclical on devotion to the rosary by Pope Leo XIII, known as the "Rosary Pope". It was issued on September 8, 1893 in Saint Peter's Basilica in Rome.

In Laetitiae sanctae, Leo XIII wrote that he was "convinced that the rosary, if devoutly used, is of benefit not only to the individual but society at large".

In Laetitiae Sanctae Leo enumerated the three causes of evils in his era: "first, the distaste for a simple and laborious life; secondly, repugnance to suffering of any kind; thirdly, the forgetfulness of the future life."

"We deplore … the growing contempt of those homely duties and virtues which make up the beauty of humble life." He sees a disdain of the simple life leading to jealousy, the trampling of rights, "and finally, the people, betrayed in their expectations, attack public order, and place themselves in conflict with those who are charged to maintain it". "People come to see happiness and comfort as things to which they are entitled, rather than things to work for." Pope Leo offers, in contrast, the House of Nazareth, contemplated in the Joyful Mysteries as a model of domestic society.

"While one can and should try to address unnecessary hazards and seek to ease one another’s burdens, suffering, sorrows, accidents, and difficulties are all part of life."

Leo noted that even the pagan world "recognized that this life was not a home but a dwelling-place, not our destination, but a stage in the journey. But men of our day, [...] pursue the false goods of this world in such wise that the thought of their true Fatherland of enduring happiness is not only set aside, but, to their shame be it said, banished and entirely erased from their memory". He recommended contemplation of the Glorious Mysteries, from which one learns that death is not an annihilation which ends all things, but merely a migration and passage from life to life."

The "repugnance to suffering" found sympathy in those who supported the utopian life popular in 1893 in which "they dream of a chimeric civilization in which all that is unpleasant shall be removed, and all that is pleasant shall be supplied."

== See also ==
- List of encyclicals of Pope Leo XIII
- Providentissimus Deus
- Rosary devotions and spirituality
- List of encyclicals of Pope Leo XIII on the Rosary
