= Divinum illud munus =

Encyclical by Pope Leo XIII

Divinum illud munus Encyclical of Pope Leo XIII
- Signature date: 9 May 1897
- Subject: On the Holy Spirit
- Number: 61 of 85 of the pontificate
- Text: In English

Divinum illud munus (English title: On the Holy Spirit) is an encyclical issued by Pope Leo XIII on May 9, 1897. In the encyclical, Leo addresses "the indwelling and miraculous power of the Holy Ghost; and the extent and efficiency of His action, both in the whole body of the Church and in the individual souls of its members, through the glorious abundance of His divine graces." As such it serves as one of the precursors to the Catholic pneumatological renaissance of the twentieth century.

== Content ==
In discussing Catholic doctrine on the Blessed Trinity, Leo noted that "The Church is accustomed most fittingly to attribute to the Father those works of the Divinity in which power excels, to the Son those in which wisdom excels, and those in which love excels to the Holy Ghost." He emphasized however the unity of the three Divine Persons, who are not to be honored separately in divine worship, nor to be considered as acting separately in the work of sanctification.

“We ought to pray to and invoke the Holy Spirit, for each one of us greatly needs His protection and His help. The more a man is deficient in wisdom, weak in strength, borne down with trouble, prone to sin, so ought he the more to fly to Him who is the never-ceasing fount of light, strength, consolation, and holiness.”

The encyclical has the following parts:

1. The Holy Ghost and Incarnation
2. The Holy Ghost in the souls of the just
3. On devotion to the Holy Ghost
4. An annual novena decreed

Divinum illud munus follows and expands upon Leo's Provida Matris ("on the Devotion to the Holy Spirit"), a much shorter letter issued May 5, 1895, in which he first introduces the idea of a Pentecost novena.

Therefore, to all those who, for nine continuous days before Pentecost, will address some particular prayers to the Holy Spirit on a daily and devoted basis, either in public or private, we grant for each day the indulgence of seven years and as many quarantines; and a plenary indulgence for one time only in any of the aforementioned days or on the day of Pentecost or in one of the following eight days, provided they confessed and communicated pray to God according to Our intention, expressed above. We also concede that if someone, by his pity, again pray with the same conditions in the eight days following Pentecost, he may again profit from the same indulgences. Moreover we decree and declare that such indulgences can also be applied as a suffrage for the holy souls of Purgatory, and that they also last for all the years to come; without prejudice to any customary and legal requirements.

== See also ==
- List of encyclicals of Pope Leo XIII
- Mystici corporis of Pius XII
