= Mainz Charterhouse =

Carthusian monastery in Mainz, Germany

Coordinates: 49.9897°N 8.2887°E

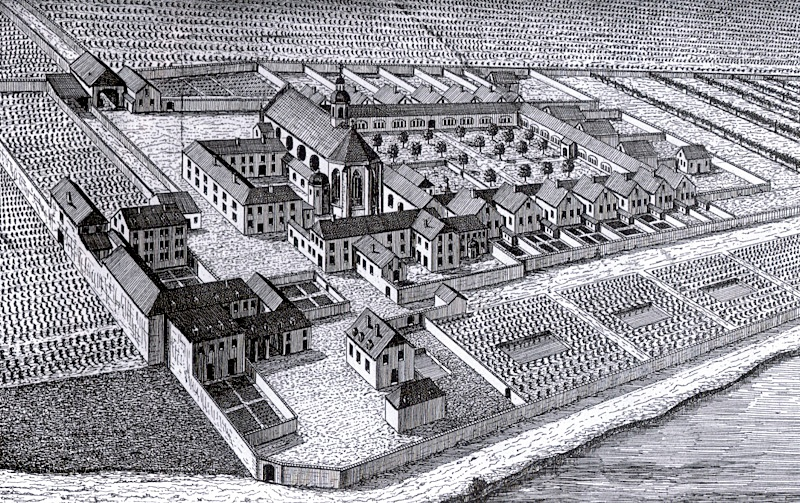
Mainz Charterhouse in the 18th century

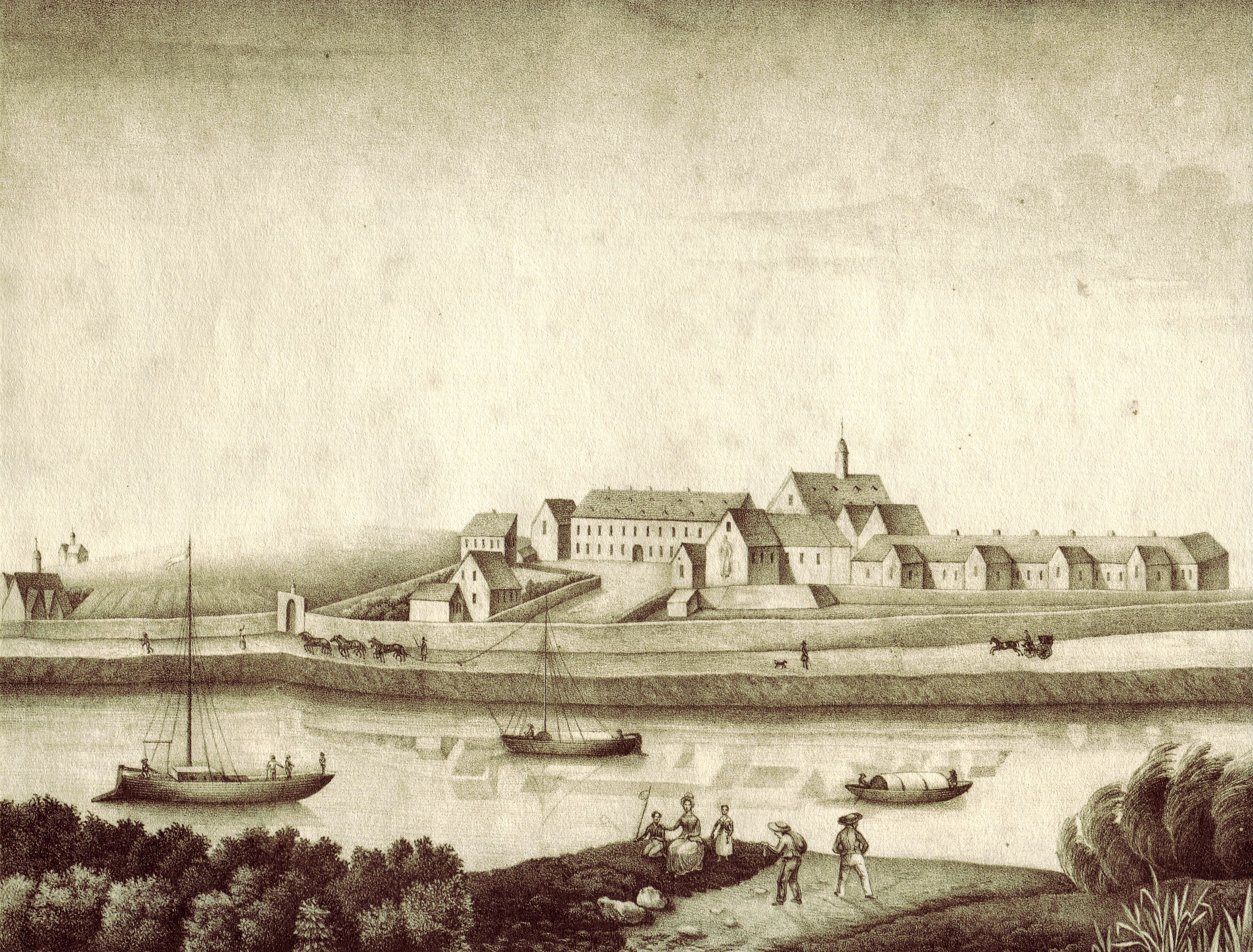
The charterhouse on the Michelsberg

Mainz Charterhouse is a former Carthusian monastery, or charterhouse, in Mainz, Rheinland-Pfalz, Germany, demolished in 1790–1792 but still marked by the street-name "Karthaus".

== History ==
The charterhouse, dedicated to Saint Michael, stood on the Michelsberg in what is now Mainz Oberstadt, a site given to the Carthusians for the construction of a monastery by Archbishop Peter von Aspelt in 1320. The conventual premises were ready for use by 1324 and were settled by monks from St. Peterstal Charterhouse near Kiedrich in the Rheingau. Construction of the church began in 1330; it was consecrated in 1350 by Bishop Albert von Beichlingen.

Following an initial gift to the Carthusians by Archbishop Peter in 1308, the charterhouse at Peterstal became operational in 1320, and the Mainz Charterhouse counts as the first Carthusian foundation in Germany. Emperor Charles IV took it under his protection in 1361, endowed it with privileges and entrusted it to the care of the Reichsschultheiss of Oppenheim. In 1434/35 Dominic of Prussia, the author of the rosary prayer still in use today, was novice master here.

On 22 August 1552 during the Second Margrave War the charterhouse was destroyed by Albert Alcibiades, Margrave of Brandenburg-Kulmbach. It was not rebuilt until 1613, after which the buildings survived almost entirely unscathed the Thirty Years' War and being besieged in the War of the Palatinate Succession (Nine Years' War). In 1689, during the siege of Mainz, the commander in chief, Duke Charles V of Lorraine, established his headquarters in the monastery along with Electors Max Emanuel of Bavaria and Johann George III of Saxony.

In 1712 Michael Welcken became prior and led the charterhouse to a new period of prosperity. He renewed all the buildings, had the church magnificently painted in 1715 and furnished the choir with valuable high altars as well as artistically significant choir stalls from 1723 to 1726 under the direction of Johann Justus Schacht of Hamburg. On the south side of the cloister with a chapel opposite, and on the other sides 22 monks' cells, each consisting of lobby, living room, kitchen, storeroom, work room, cellar and garden.

Prince-Bishop and Elector Friedrich Karl Joseph von Erthal had the charterhouse dissolved by Pope Pius VI on 24 August 1781. Its assets were transferred to the Johannes Gutenberg-Universität Mainz. The assembled monks were informed of the decision on 15 November and given the choice of either moving to Erfurt Charterhouse or of becoming secular clergy, with a pension. In 1788 the Elector bought back the monastic complex for 83,000 Gulden and from 1790 to 1792 had the church demolished along with the cloister, chapel and residential buildings. He added the site to the gardens of his adjoining palace, Schloss Favorite, which was itself completely destroyed during the siege of Mainz in 1793.

On the site of the former charterhouse there now runs the street "Kartaus", where in memory of the monastery there has also been since 1912 a "Kartaus Fountain" (Brunnen Kartaus) with the figure of the founder of the Carthusian Order, Saint Bruno of Cologne.
