= Superiore anno =

Papal encyclical by Pope Leo XIII

Superiore anno Latin for 'Last year' Encyclical of Pope Leo XIII
- Signature date: 30 August 1884
- Subject: On the Recitation of the Rosary
- Number: 15 of 85 of the pontificate
- Text: In English

Superiore anno is an encyclical by Pope Leo XIII, issued on August 30, 1884, on the recitation of the Rosary. It was signed a year after Supremi apostolatus officio.

Pope Leo reiterated the exhortation expressed in the previous year's Supremi apostolatus officio that special rosary devotions be conducted throughout the month of October, particularly in light of the recent outbreak of cholera spreading from the ports.

He further modified the previous year's decree, "As We desire also to consult the interests of those who live in country districts, and are hindered, especially in the month of October, by their agricultural labours, We permit all We have above decreed, and also the holy Indulgences gainable in the month of October, to be postponed to the following months of November or December, according to the prudent decision of the Ordinaries."

== See also ==
- List of encyclicals of Pope Leo XIII on the Rosary
