= Dominic of Prussia =

Carthusian monk and ascetic

Dominic of Prussia (German: Dominik von Preußen; Latin: Dominicus Prutenus; 1382–1461) was a Carthusian monk and ascetical writer. He is credited with a popular early form of the Rosary which focused on meditation.

== Life ==
Born in Danzig (contemporarily Gdańsk), Prussia. According to the account he wrote of himself, his first teacher was the parish priest, a pious Dominican; later he was a student at the University of Krakow where he was noted for his intelligence. Falling into bad habits he led a vagabond life until twenty-five years of age, when he reformed through the influence of Adolf of Essen, prior of the Carthusian monastery of St. Alban, near Trier. Dominic became a Carthusian, entering the order in 1409. His monastic life was one of severe penance and religious fervour and many visions are ascribed to him. Among the positions he filled were those of master of novices at Mainz and vicar of the monastery of St. Alban, where he died. As an author, Dominic composed seventeen treatises, which have been preserved.

== Carthusian Rosary ==
To Dominic is attributed the practice of meditation during the recitation of the Hail Marys, which he called the "Life of Jesus Rosary". As in his time the Ave Maria terminated with the words; "Fructus ventris tui, Jesus", he added to each a sentence to recall to mind the mystery. It included such themes as the Adoration of the Magi and the Flight into Egypt. Dominic's psalter was made up of fifty "Aves", plus the Pater Noster and the Gloria Patri, making it Trinitarian in nature. "The number of Hail Marys are not important. What counts is the quality of one’s meditation, of authentic contemplative prayer."

Both Dominic and his friend Adolf of Essen sought to spread the use of this form of prayer in the Carthusian Order and among the laity. They were very successful and psalters of this type multiplied in the 15th century. For these reasons it is called the "Carthusian Rosary". Some authors believe that the "Psalter" of Dominic was the form, or one of the original forms, from which the present Rosary developed.

He died in 1461 at St. Alban's Charterhouse near Trier.

== Works ==
- Liber experientiae
