= Vi è ben noto =

Papal encyclical by Pope Leo XIII

Vi è ben noto Italian for 'You are well aware' Encyclical of Pope Leo XIII
- Signature date: 20 September 1887
- Subject: On the Rosary and Public Life
- Number: 22 of 85 of the pontificate
- Text: In English

Vi è ben noto is an encyclical of Pope Leo XIII, dated 20 September 1887, written to the Italian Episcopate for the dedication of the entire month of October to the prayer of the Holy Rosary in order to improve the situation of the Church in Italy and the freedom of the Pontiff.

"It cannot be concealed that, although thanks to the mercy of God religious feeling is strong and widely spread among Italians, nevertheless by the evil influence of men and the times religious indifference is on the increase, and hence there is a lessening of that respect and filial love for the Church which was the glory of our ancestors and in which they placed their highest ambition." He urged the bishops to encourage among their parishioners an "open and sincere profession of the faith and teaching of Jesus Christ, casting aside all human respect, and considering before all things the interest of religion and the salvation of souls." Leo invokes Mary under the title "Queen of the Rosary", and raised the classification of Feast of the Rosary (October 7) to a double of the second class.

== See also ==
- List of encyclicals of Pope Leo XIII on the Rosary
