= Libertas praestantissimum =

1930 papal encyclical by Pius XI

Libertas praestantissimum Latin for 'Liberty, the highest' Encyclical of Pope Leo XIII
- Signature date: 20 June 1888
- Subject: On the nature of human liberty
- Number: 26 of 88 of the pontificate
- Text: In Latin; In English

Libertas praestantissimum (lit. 'Liberty, the highest') is an encyclical issued by Pope Leo XIII in 1888 that concerns the theory of classical liberalism.
