= Christi Matri =

1966 encyclical by Pope Paul VI

Christi matri Latin for 'Mother of Christ' Encyclical of Pope Paul VI
- Signature date: 15 September 1966
- Subject: Appeals to the Blessed Virgin in October
- Number: 4 of 7 of the pontificate
- Text: In Latin; In English

Christi Matri is an encyclical by Pope Paul VI issued on 15 September 1966 to encourage the faithful to pray for peace by way of the customary special devotions during the month of October, traditionally dedicated in honor of the Most Blessed Virgin.

== Description ==
Recognizing that it is traditional to pray the Rosary especially during the month of October, Paul VI, citing the custom of his predecessors, (such as Pope Leo XIII), called for special devotions in honor of the Most Blessed Virgin, particularly to invoke her intercession for peace. The encyclical was issued during the time of the Vietnam War, and the pontiff makes specific reference to "parts of eastern Asia where a bloody and hard-fought war is raging. ... We are also disturbed by what we know to be going on in other areas, such as the growing nuclear armaments race, the senseless nationalism, the racism, the obsession for revolution, the separations imposed upon citizens, the nefarious plots, the slaughter of innocent people."

Pope Paul recalled his address to the General Assembly of the United Nations, where he urged all to devote their efforts and zeal to the establishment of peace. October 4, the anniversary of the visit to the UN was to be a day of prayer for peace. The bishops were given the responsibility to see how this would be carried out locally.

In the encyclical the pope recommended the praying of the rosary in the coming October in light of the war and the dangers of atomic conflict. He recommended prayers to Queen of Peace and Mother of the Church:

Nothing seems more appropriate and valuable than to have the prayers of the whole Christian family rise to the Mother of God, who is invoked as the Queen of Peace, begging her to pour forth abundant gifts of her maternal goodness in midst of so many great trials and hardships. We want constant and devout prayers to be offered to her whom We declared Mother of the Church, its spiritual parent, during the celebration of the Second Vatican Council,

The encyclical urged a diplomatic end to the Vietnam War. After the encyclical was issued, some cardinals such as Francis Spellman continued to support the war.

== See also ==
- Marian papal encyclicals and Apostolic Letters
- Octobri mense
- Roman Catholic Mariology
- Rosarium Virginis Mariae
