= Quod auctoritate =

Papal encyclical by Pope Leo XIII

Quod auctoritate Encyclical of Pope Leo XIII
- Signature date: 22 September 1885
- Subject: The Annunciation of an Extraordinary Holy Year
- Text: In English

Quod auctoritate is an encyclical published by Pope Leo XIII on 22 December 1885. It has the subtitle: "The Annunciation of an Extraordinary Holy Year", which coincided with the fiftieth anniversary of the pope's ordination.

On 22 December 1885 Pope Leo proclaimed the upcoming year as an extraordinary Holy Year, and placed it under the patronage of Our Lady of the Rosary. The Holy year was intended to counter social and religious decay. It was his and the Church's duty to confront this evil. The Holy Jubilee has only the salvation of hearts as its purpose, and it serves not only the individual but all nations.

As already described in several of Leo XIII's encyclicals of the Rosary, this year the connection with the Blessed Mother Mary should be strengthened through the prayer of the Rosary, which he invites all the faithful to do. He emphatically reiterates his exhortations not to slacken in faith and to ask for the help of the Blessed Virgin.

Among the rules established in order to obtain the Holy Year indulgence were: the usual conditions of confession and communion with a visit to a designated church. Inhabitants of Rome were to make two visits, either to the Vatican or the Lateran, those living outside Rome, two visits to any of three churches designated by their regional bishop, otherwise the above rules shall apply mutatis mutandis. Seafarers and travellers fulfil their duties if they visit their main or parish church six times and comply with the aforementioned rules.

== See also ==
- List of encyclicals of Pope Leo XIII on the Rosary
