= Magnae Dei Matris =

Papal encyclical by Pope Leo XIII

Magnae Dei Matris Latin for 'The Great Mother of God' Encyclical of Pope Leo XIII
- Signature date: 8 September 1892
- Subject: The Rosary and Christian Life
- Number: 44 of 88 of the pontificate
- Text: In Latin; In English

The encyclical Magnae Dei Matris (The Great Mother of God) was issued on 8 September 1892. It is subtitled "The Rosary and Christian Life" and discusses the relation of the rosary to faith and morality.

With this encyclical Leo continues the series of rosary encyclicals and emphasizes the following characteristics: the Rosary as an aid and voice of prayer; in the Rosary, Mary's life is portrayed as an example; the continuous prayer of the Rosary serves piety and is a holy source of divine consolation.

Leo describes the Rosary as presenting the chief mysteries of the faith for contemplation, and presents Mary "a most suitable example of every virtue."

For it is mainly by faith that a man sets out on the straight and sure path to God and learns to revere in mind and heart His supreme majesty, His sovereignty over the whole of creation, His unsounded power, wisdom, and providence. For he who comes to God must believe that God exists and is a rewarder to those who seek Him.

The pontiff recalls how often he has turned to Mary for help as a "gracious Mother" always there to provide assistance.

In Magnae Dei Matris, Leo derided the license of his times, particularly as demonstrated in the sciences and arts and the writings of the press and the "consequent laxity" in the practice of the Faith.

== See also ==
- List of encyclicals of Pope Leo XIII on the Rosary
