= Mense maio =

1965 papal encyclical by Paul VI

Mense maio Latin for 'The Month of May' Encyclical of Pope Paul VI
- Signature date: 29 April 1965
- Subject: Catholics are invited to pray for peace to the Virgin Mary during the month of May
- Number: 2 of 7 of the pontificate
- Text: In Latin; In English

Mense maio is an encyclical of Pope Paul VI promulgated on 29 April 1965, which focused on the Virgin Mary, to whom traditionally the month of May is dedicated as the Mother of God. It is a call to pray for peace in the world during the month of May. "The pastoral urgency in the political struggle with communism was the underlying cause for writing the letter."

Paul VI writes, "Since Mary is rightly to be regarded as the way by which we are led to Christ, the person who encounters Mary cannot help but encounter Christ likewise."

== Mater Ecclesiae ==
Issued in the midst of the Second Vatican Council, Pope Paul first invokes Mary as "Mother of the Church", to guide and prosper the deliberations of the council fathers and the subsequent implementation of the results. The Pope formally conferred the title, (first used by Ambrose of Milan), some months previously on the Feast of the Presentation of Mary in November 1964, at the close of the Third Session.

== Threats to peace ==
Paul VI then expresses his concern over the state of international affairs and encourages world leaders to seek diplomatic solutions rather than resort to war. He specifically condemns "...secret and treacherous warfare, terrorist activities, the taking of hostages, and savage reprisals against unarmed people. These are crimes which debilitate man's awareness of what is just and humane, and further embitter the hearts of the combatants."

He asks for special prayers "for the intercession and protection of the Blessed Virgin Mary, who is the Queen of peace" during the month of May, especially the Rosary and also particularly on the Feast of Queenship of Mary (at that time celebrated on May 31). "May she enlighten the minds of those who rule nations. And finally, may she prevail on God, who rules the winds and storms, to calm the tempests in men's warring hearts and grant us peace in our day."
