= Ingruentium malorum =

1951 papal encyclical by Pius XII

Ingruentium malorum Latin for 'In the face of approaching evils' Encyclical of Pope Pius XII
- Signature date: 15 September 1951
- Number: 22 of the pontificate

Ingruentium malorum (English: In the face of approaching evils) is an encyclical of Pope Pius XII on reciting the rosary, issued on September 15, 1951, the Feast of the Seven Sorrows of the Virgin Mary:

It is an appeal for an intensification of the traditional October Rosary devotions, making a particular recommendation for the family recitation of the Rosary, begging Our Lady to obtain peace for individuals, for families, for peoples, for nations, and for the Church throughout the world.

== Contents ==
The encyclical states that from the beginning of his pontificate, Pope Pius XII entrusted to the Mother of God the destiny of the human family. Six years after the Second World War, fraternal harmony among nations had not yet been re-established. Church "persecution in many parts of the world make the blood of martyrs flow again and again". The encyclical states that the Holy Rosary is the most fitting and most fruitful means to learn about the faith itself:

As is clearly suggested by the very origin of this practice, heavenly rather than human, and by its nature. What prayers are better adapted and more beautiful than the Lord's Prayer and the Angelical salutation, which are the flowers with which this mystical crown is formed? With meditation of the Sacred Mysteries added to the vocal prayers, there emerges another very great advantage, so that all, even the most simple and least educated, have in this a prompt and easy way to nourish and preserve their own faith.

The pope argues that the repeating of identical formulas has a positive impact on those who pray, giving them confidence in Mary:

The recitation of identical formulas repeated so many times, rather than rendering the prayer sterile and boring, has, on the contrary, the admirable quality of infusing confidence in him who prays and brings to bear a gentle compulsion on the motherly Heart of Mary

=== Family recitation of the Rosary ===
Pius strongly encourages Catholic families to pray the rosary together. This reflects the practice in his own family while he was growing up.

The custom of the family recitation of the Holy Rosary is a most efficacious means. What a sweet sight—most pleasing to God—when, at eventide, the Christian home resounds with the frequent repetition of praises in honor of the High Queen of Heaven! Then the Rosary, recited in the family, assembled before the image of the Virgin, in an admirable union of hearts, the parents and their children, who come back from their daily work. It unites them piously with those absent and those dead. It links all more tightly in a sweet bond of love, with the most Holy Virgin, who, like a loving mother, in the circle of her children, will be there bestowing upon them an abundance of the gifts of concord and family peace.

Pope Pius XII put great confidence in the Holy Rosary for the healing of evils which afflict the times. He states that while reciting the Rosary, Catholics should not forget those who languish in prison camps, jails, and concentration camps. "There are among them, as you know, also Bishops dismissed from their Sees solely for having heroically defended the sacred rights of God and the Church. There are sons, fathers and mothers, wrested from their homes and compelled to lead unhappy lives far away in unknown lands and strange climates". The Pope imparts his Apostolic Blessing to each reader and particularly to those who recite the holy Rosary during the month of October.

== See also ==
- Fulgens corona
- Mystici corporis Christi
- Rosarium Virginis Mariae
