= Rosarium Virginis Mariae =

2002 papal letter by John Paul II

Rosarium Virginis Mariæ (Rosary of the Virgin Mary) is an apostolic letter by Pope John Paul II, issued on October 16, 2002, which declared from October 2002 to October 2003 as the "Year of the Rosary". It was published by Pope John Paul II in 2002 at the beginning of the twenty-fifth year of his pontificate.

== Introduction ==
John Paul II Coat of arms with the Marian Cross

This apostolic letter deals with the Rosary and follows Pope Paul VI in viewing it as compendium of the Gospel message:

The Rosary, though clearly Marian in character, is at heart a Christocentric prayer. In the sobriety of its elements, it has all the depth of the Gospel message in its entirety, of which it can be said to be a compendium. ...Through the Rosary the faithful receive abundant grace, as though from the very hands of the Mother of the Redeemer.

In the 1569 papal bull Consueverunt, Pope Pius V noted that "the Rosary or Psalter of the Blessed Virgin" is a "method of prayer" through which we "venerate Mary with the Angelical salutation repeated 150 times according to the number of David's psalms, and before every set of ten Hail Mary's we say the prayer of Our Lord with meditations that illustrate the entire life of the same Lord Jesus Christ".

The apostolic letter quotes Louis de Montfort:

“Our entire perfection consists in being conformed, united and consecrated to Jesus Christ. Hence the most perfect of all devotions is undoubtedly that which conforms, unites and consecrates us most perfectly to Jesus Christ. Now, since Mary is of all creatures the one most conformed to Jesus Christ, it follows that among all devotions that which most consecrates and conforms a soul to our Lord is devotion to Mary, his Holy Mother, and that the more a soul is consecrated to her the more will it be consecrated to Jesus Christ."

== Luminous mysteries ==
As Christian history developed, in medieval spirituality, religious devotion developed a notable Christocentric orientation that was consolidated under the influence of monasticism which placed strong emphasis on the humanity of Jesus, seen in the mysteries of his earthly life. Thus, the affectus dilectionis (preferential love) warms Cistercian piety with Bernard of Clairvaux and William of Saint-Thierry, whereas Franciscan spirituality focuses on the tradition of the crib and contemplation of the passion. Dominican piety, with Albert the Great and Catherine of Siena, like Francis of Assisi sees the crucified Christ as the center of religious devotion.

In this letter John Paul II introduces the "Mysteries of Light" into the cycle of the mysteries of the life of Christ that are to be contemplated while praying the rosary. These five "luminous mysteries" focus devotion on the events of the public ministry of Jesus Christ:

- (1) his baptism in the Jordan,
- (2) his self-manifestation at the wedding of Cana,
- (3) his proclamation of the Kingdom of God,
- (4) his Transfiguration, and
- (5) his institution of the Eucharist.

The document states that each mystery "is a revelation of the Kingdom now present in the very person of Jesus". Lengthy and diversified in content, the apostolic letter can be considered a practical pastoral instrument in various ways: How to pray the Rosary as a form of contemplative prayer, brief explanations of the mysteries, the meanings of the "Our Father", the ten "Hail Marys", the "Gloria", the concluding prayers, the beads, and the chain.

== See also ==
- Christi Matri
- Marian papal encyclicals and Apostolic Letters
- Octobri mense
- Marialis Cultus
