= Supremi apostolatus officio =

Papal encyclical by Pope Leo XIII

Supremi apostolatus officio Latin for 'The Supreme Apostolic Office' Encyclical of Pope Leo XIII
- Signature date: 1 September 1883
- Subject: On Devotion of the Rosary
- Number: 12 of 85 of the pontificate
- Text: In English

Supremi apostolatus officio (lit. 'The Supreme Apostolic Office'), commonly referred to as "On Devotion of the Rosary", is the first of a number of encyclicals of Pope Leo XIII on the Rosary. It was issued on 1 September 1883, encouraging the practice.

Leo XIII echoed the words of the oldest known Marian prayer (known in the Latin tradition as the "Sub Tuum Praesidium"), when he wrote, "It has always been the habit of Catholics in danger and in troublous times to fly for refuge to Mary." He then gives a brief history of the rosary.

The saint who instituted the Rosary was St. Dominic who was fighting the heresy of the Albigensians:

"Our merciful God, as you know, raised up against these most direful enemies a most holy man, the illustrious parent and founder of the Dominican Order... he proceeded undauntedly to attack the enemies of the Catholic Church, not by force of arms; but trusting wholly to that devotion which he was the first to institute under the name of the Holy Rosary"

The Albigensians were a "neo-Manichaean sect that flourished in southern France in the 12th and 13th centuries [...] The Albigenses asserted the coexistence of two mutually opposed principles one good, and one evil. The former is the creator of the spiritual, the latter of the material world."

Leo also claimed that the praying of the Rosary had resulted in Catholic victories over enemies in battles:

"[I]n the sixteenth century, when the vast forces of the Turks threatened to impose on nearly the whole of Europe the yoke of superstition and barbarism [...] the Christian fleet gained a magnificent victory, with no great loss to itself, in which the enemy were routed with great slaughter.

[...] Similarly, important successes were in the last century gained over the Turks at Temeswar, in Pannonia, and at Corfu; and in both cases these engagements coincided with feasts of the Blessed Virgin and with the conclusion of public devotions of the Rosary. And this led our predecessor, Clement XI, in his gratitude, to decree that the Blessed Mother of God should every year be especially honoured in her Rosary by the whole Church."

Leo saw the Rosary as "an effective spiritual weapon against the evils afflicting society". "Not only do We earnestly exhort all Christians to give themselves to the recital of the pious devotion of the Rosary publicly, or privately in their own house and family, and that unceasingly, but we also desire that the whole of the month of October in this year should be consecrated to the Holy Queen of the Rosary."

In furtherance of this, he recommended that from October 1 to November 2, in every parish, and where practicable in every chapel dedicated to the Blessed Virgin: "let five decades of the Rosary be recited with the addition of the Litany of Loreto. We desire that the people should frequent these pious exercises; and We will that either Mass shall be said at the altar, or that the Blessed Sacrament shall be exposed to the adoration of the faithful, Benediction being afterwards given."
