= Marialis Cultus =

Marialis Cultus (English: Marian Devotion) is the title of a Mariological apostolic exhortation by Pope Paul VI issued on February 2, 1974. It is subtitled: "For the Right Ordering and Development of Devotion to the Blessed Virgin Mary", and discusses Marian devotions, clarifying the way in which the Roman Catholic Church celebrates and commemorates Mary, the mother of Jesus. The exhortation sought to integrate devotion to Mary into the pastoral catechetical process, especially in liturgical catechesis, in a manner harmonious with the reforms of Vatican II. Mary must always be understood in relation to Jesus.

== History ==
The preparation of the document reportedly took 4 years.

The exhortation has three parts:

- Part 1 discusses the history of Catholicism's Marian devotions, as well as their rationale.
- Part 2 guidelines for Devotion to the Blessed Virgin
- Part 3 touches on the Angelus and the Rosary prayers.

Marialis Cultus gives guidelines for devotions to Mary by the Church – that is, it attempts to make sure that all Marian liturgical celebrations and public expressions of devotion align with established doctrine. [T]he history of piety shows how 'the various forms of devotion towards the Mother of God that the Church has approved within the limits of wholesome and orthodox doctrine' have developed in harmonious subordination to the worship of Christ." True Marian devotion is always trinitarian, Christocentric, biblical, and ecclesial.

...we consider it opportune to draw attention to certain attitudes of piety which are incorrect. The Second Vatican Council has already authoritatively denounced both the exaggeration of content and form which even falsifies doctrine and likewise the small-mindedness which obscures the figure and mission of Mary... Another deviation is sterile and ephemeral sentimentality, so alien to the spirit of the Gospel that demands persevering and practical action. We reaffirm the Council's reprobation of such attitudes and practices. They are not in harmony with the Catholic Faith and therefore they must have no place in Catholic worship...

It is generally recognized that there are three elements in devotion to Mary: veneration, invocation, or calling upon her for her motherly and queenly intercession, and imitation. The exhortation noted that every element of the church's prayer life, including Marian devotions, should draw its inspiration from the Bible and harmonize with the liturgy.

The conclusion to the document emphasizes the theological and pastoral value of devotion to the Blessed Virgin Mary.

== See also ==
- Catholic Mariology
- Mediator Dei
- Redemptoris Mater
- Marian papal encyclicals and Apostolic Letters
