= Confraternity of the Rosary =

Roman Catholic archconfraternity under the Dominican Order

The Confraternity of the Holy Rosary is a Roman Catholic Archconfraternity or spiritual association, under the care and guidance of the Dominican Order. The members of the confraternity strive to pray the entire Holy Rosary weekly.

== History ==
Dominican Order Coat of Arms

The earliest evidence of a Rosary Confraternity dated from the last quarter of the fifteenth century. There were Dominican guilds or fraternities, but it is not known if they were connected with the Rosary. Through the preaching of Alanus de Rupe (Alan de la Roche) such associations began to be erected shortly before 1475.

One of the first was erected at Cologne in 1474 by Fr. James Sprenger.

The Perpetual Rosary is an organization for securing the continuous recitation of the Rosary by day and night among a number of associates who perform their allotted share at stated times. This is a development of the Rosary Confraternity, and dates from the seventeenth century.

The Confraternity was last reorganized by Pope Leo XIII in 1898 with the Apostolic Constitution, Ubi Primum.

== Organization ==
This archconfraternity is under the administration of the Dominican order, as is the Confraternity of the Holy Name and The Confraternity of Angelic Warfare. Thus no new confraternity may be erected without the sanction of the Dominican Master General. In the "patent of erection", which is issued for each new confraternity by the General of the Dominicans, a clause is added granting to all members enrolled therein "a participation in all the good works which by the grace of God are performed throughout the world by the brethren and sisters of the said [Dominican] Order."

Throughout the world, the Archconfraternity is administered by the different Provinces of the Dominican order. In the United States, the Eastern Dominican Province (Province of St. Joseph) has its Confraternity based in Columbus, Ohio. The Rosary Confraternity of the Western Dominican Province (Province of the Holy Name of Jesus) is based in Portland, Oregon at their Rosary Center. The Rosary Confraternity is probably the largest organization of this type within the Catholic Church.

== Benefits and obligations ==
Members of the Rosary Confraternity promise the recitation of a weekly Rosary as their sole obligation. This does not bind under pain of sin. Along with several plenary and partial indulgences that are granted to members of the Confraternity, members also believe they are benefited from the countless Rosaries that are offered for their intentions by the other members throughout the world. In addition, enrolled members also participate in all the prayers and good works performed by the friars, nuns, sisters, and laity of the Dominican Order. The Rosary Confraternity of the Dominican Province of the Most Holy Name of Jesus publishes Light and Life, a bi-monthly newsletter of the Rosary Confraternity of the Western Province.

=== Indulgences ===
1. For members of the Rosary Confraternity, a plenary indulgence, under the usual conditions, is granted:
  1. on the day of enrollment. (When application is made, a certificate of membership is sent, indicating the day of the enrollment.)
  2. on the following feast days: Christmas, Easter, Annunciation, Purification, Assumption, Our Lady of the Rosary, and Immaculate Conception.
2. For those who pray the Rosary, a plenary indulgence is granted under the usual conditions, when the Rosary is prayed in Church, or in a Public Oratory, in a family (family Rosary), Religious Community, or Pious Association. Otherwise a partial indulgence is granted.

=== Obligations ===
Each member must have his/her name inscribed in the register of the Confraternity and strive to pray the fifteen mysteries of the Rosary each week and to include the other members of the Confraternity in their intentions. This is the sole obligation of membership in the Rosary Confraternity. It does not bind under pain of sin. There are no meetings, and no dues.

Since Pope John Paul II, in his 2002 Apostolic Letter, added the five luminous mysteries, members of the Confraternity are encouraged to include that extra weekly Rosary. However, this is entirely optional; the Rosary Confraternity does not require its members to recite the new Luminous Mysteries. Those who recite only the fifteen traditional mysteries (the Joyful, Sorrowful and Glorious Mysteries) will continue to share in the benefits of the Rosary Confraternity.

== Related organizations ==
The "Perpetual Rosary" is an organization for securing the continuous recitation of the Rosary by day and night among a number of associates who perform their allotted share at stated times. This is a development of the Rosary Confraternity, and dates from the seventeenth century. It is continues in various convents which exist for the purpose as well as in lay society

The "Living Rosary" or "Association of the Living Rosary" was begun in 1826 by Pauline Marie Jaricot. While it is independent of the confraternity it is also under the administration of the Dominican Order and its goals coincide. It consists in a number of circles of fifteen members who each agree to recite a single decade every day and who thus complete the whole Rosary between them. In the year 1877, the pope Pius IX subjected all Associations of the Living Rosary to the general of the Dominican Order. However recently the care of the association has given to the local Bishops.

In some parishes in the United States, the Confraternity of the Most Holy Rosary is also known as the Altar Rosary Society.

== See also ==
- Archconfraternity
- Blue Army of Our Lady of Fatima
- Holy Name Society
- Order of Preachers
- Rosary devotions and spirituality
