= Pope Pius XII apostolic constitutions and bulls =

Pope Pius XII apostolic constitutions and bulls includes a listing of all apostolic constitutions and papal bulls issued by Pope Pius XII (1939-1958):

- Bis saeculari (September 27, 1948)
- Christus Dominus (January 6, 1953)
- Exsul Familia (August 1, 1952)
- Munificentissimus Deus (November 1, 1950)
- Provida Mater Ecclesia (February 2, 1947)
- Jubilaeum maximum (May 26, 1949)
- Sedes sapientiae (May 31, 1956)
- Sponsa Christi (November 21, 1950)
