= Mariological papal documents =

Papal decrees and doctrines concerning the Virgin Mary

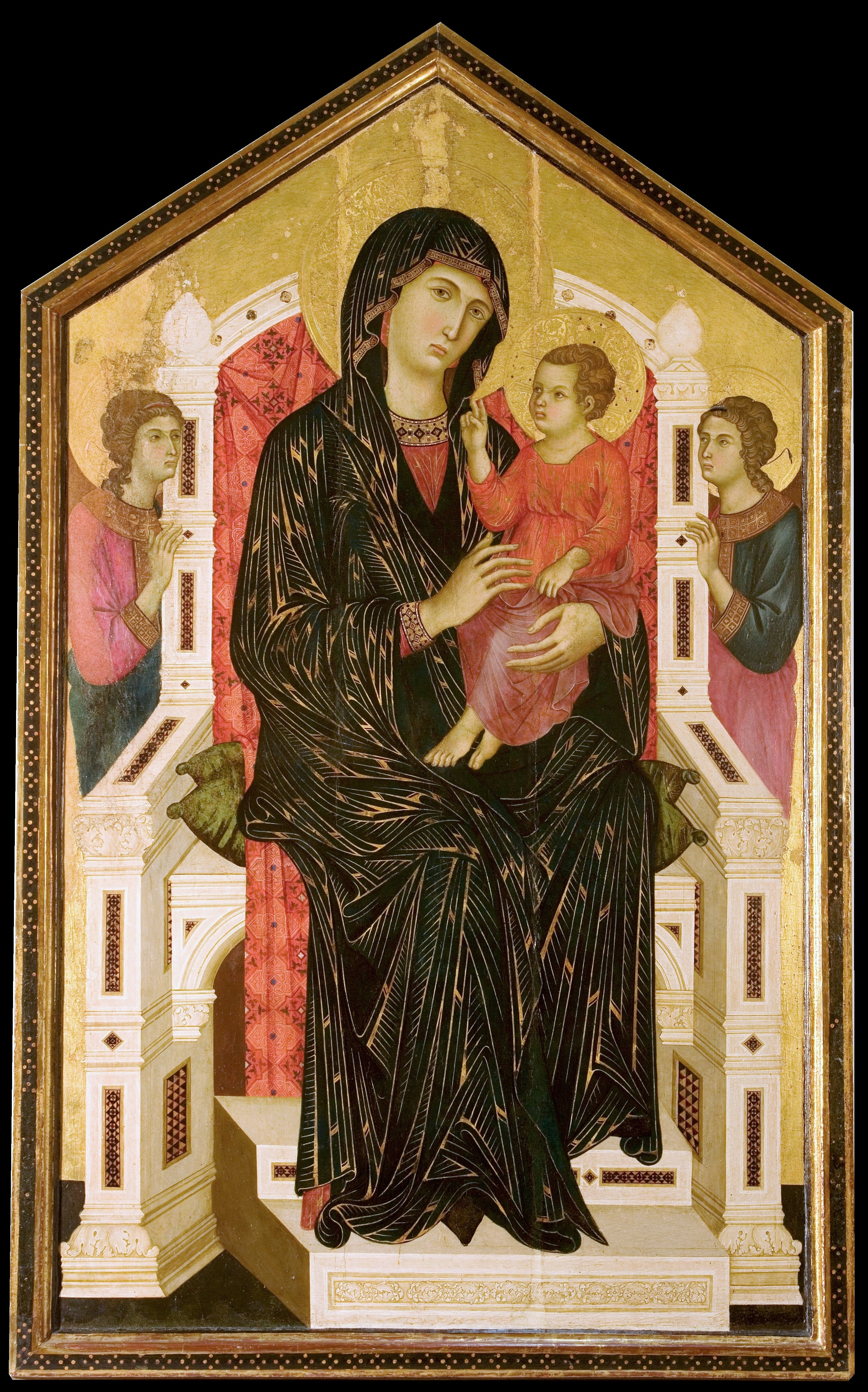
Madonna and Child, Master of Badia a Isola, c.1300

Mariological papal documents have been a major force that has shaped Catholic Mariology over the centuries. Mariology is developed by theologians on the basis not only of Scripture and Tradition but also of the sensus fidei of the faithful as a whole, "from the bishops to the last of the faithful", and papal documents have recorded those developments, defining Marian dogmas, spreading doctrines and encouraging devotions within the Catholic Church.

Popes have been highly influential for the development of doctrine and the veneration of the Blessed Virgin Mary. They made decisions not only in the area of Marian beliefs but also Marian practices and devotions. Before the twentieth century, Popes promulgated Marian veneration and beliefs by authorizing new Marian feast days, prayers, initiatives, and special privileges. Since Pope Leo XIII, Popes have promulgated Mariology also with encyclicals, apostolic letters and with two dogmas (Immaculate Conception and Assumption). This article reviews the major official teachings by the popes.

== Background ==
Historically a Papal bull was "an Apostolic letter with a leaden seal." A papal bull is an official formal decree. In terms of formality, papal bulls and apostolic constitutions are above encyclicals, followed by apostolic letters. An apostolic constitution is the highest level of decree issued by the Pope, and is generally issued as a bull with the requisite formalities regarding seal and signature. By their nature, apostolic constitutions are addressed to the public, whereas encyclicals are usually addressed to patriarchs, primates, archbishops and bishops in communion with the Holy See.

== Dogmas ==
=== The perpetual virginity of Mary ===
- Dominici gregis – This papal bull was issued by Pope Clement VIII on 3 February 1603. It considered Marian piety the basis for Church and condemned a number of issues as errors, including the denial of the virginity of Mary.

=== Mother of God ===
This dogma was proclaimed at the Council of Ephesus in 431 and promulgated by Pope Celestine I. This dogma has attached to it the penalty of an anathema. It was promulgated during the Nestorian Heresy who state that Mary was just the "Christotokos" (Mother of the Christ) rather than the "Theotokos" (Mother of God)

=== The Immaculate Conception ===
- Cum Praeexcelsa, a bull by Pope Sixtus IV, issued 28 February 1476, when plague was ravaging the country, established a Mass and Office for the Feast of the Immaculate Conception.

Coat of arms of Pius IX

- Ubi primum is an encyclical of Pope Pius IX to the bishops of the Catholic Church asking them for opinion on the definition of a dogma on the Immaculate Conception of the Virgin Mary. It was issued on 2 February 1849.
- Ineffabilis Deus – In this key papal bull (the title of which means "ineffable God" in Latin) Pope Pius IX defined ex cathedra the dogma of the Immaculate Conception of the Blessed Virgin Mary. The decree was promulgated on 8 December 1854, the date of the annual Feast of the Immaculate Conception. The decree surveys the history of the belief, citing its roots in the long-standing feast of the Conception of Mary as a date of significance in the Eastern and Western churches. It also cites the approval of Catholic bishops worldwide who were asked in 1849 to offer their opinion on the matter. (The decree had been preceded by the encyclical Ubi Primum of 2 February 1849 whereby Pius IX solicited the opinions of the bishops of the Catholic Church regarding defining dogma.
- Ad diem illum – This encyclical by Pope Pius X on the Immaculate Conception, was given on 2 February 1904, in the first year of his Pontificate. It was issued in commemoration of the fiftieth anniversary of the dogma of the Immaculate Conception. It is an important document because it explains the Mariology of Pope Pius X. One of the reasons the pope gave for writing the encyclical was his desire for the restoration of all things in Christ which he had defined as his motto Instaurare omnia in Christo: to restore everything in Christ, to whom there is no safer or more direct road than Mary.
- Fulgens corona – This encyclical by Pope Pius XII was issued on 8 September 1953 on the Feast of the Nativity of the Blessed Virgin Mary. The encyclical proclaimed a Marian year for 1954, to commemorate the centenary of the definition of the dogma of the Immaculate Conception of the Virgin Mary. Fulgens corona is significant as it contained the Mariological methodology of Pope Pius XII and his views on limits and challenges of Roman Catholic Mariology.

=== The Assumption ===
- Deiparae Virginis Mariae (1 May 1946) – an encyclical of Pope Pius XII to all Catholic bishops on the possibility of defining the Assumption of the Blessed Virgin Mary as a dogma of faith.
- Munificentissimus Deus This Apostolic constitution (the title of which means "most bountiful God" in Latin) was issued by Pope Pius XII on 1 November 1950. It defines ex cathedra the dogma of the Assumption of the Blessed Virgin Mary. It is the second ex-cathedra infallible statement ever made by a Pope, the first since the official ruling on Papal Infallibility was made at the First Vatican Council (1869-1870). Following the example of Pius IX, Pope Pius XII issued the encyclical Deiparae Virginis Mariae on issued on 1 May 1946 to all Catholic bishops on the possibility of defining the Assumption of the Blessed Virgin Mary as a dogma of faith.

== On Mary as Queen of Heaven ==
- Ad Caeli Reginam – This encyclical was issued by Pope Pius XII, on the feast of the Maternity of the Blessed Virgin Mary, 11 October 1954. The encyclical is an important element of the Mariology of Pope Pius XII and established the feast Queenship of Mary.

== Mary, as intercessor for Peace ==
Pius XII's signature

- Auspicia quaedam – Auspicia quaedam is an encyclical of Pope Pius XII published on 1 May 1948, dealing with worldwide public prayers to the Virgin Mary for world peace and the solution of the Israeli–Palestinian conflict, given at Rome at St. Peter's, in the tenth year of his pontificate.
- Christi Matri – an encyclical of Pope Paul VI issued on 15 September 1966, calling for special devotions during the month of October, invoking the intercession of the Blessed Virgin for peace.

== On the rosary ==
- Consueverunt Romani Pontifices is a papal bull by Pope Pius V issued on 17 September 1569 on the rosary. This papal bull instituted the essence of the rosary's present configuration.
- Supremi apostolatus officio, issued on 1 September 1883, is the first of Pope Leo XIII's many encyclicals on the Rosary.
- Superiore anno, encyclical issued on 30 August 1884 by Leo XIII "On the Recitation of the Rosary".
- Octobri mense is an encyclical on the Rosary by Pope Leo XIII, issued on 22 September 1891. The subject was the power of prayer and the efficacy of the rosary.
- Ingruentium malorum – This encyclical of Pope Pius XII focused on the rosary. It was given on 15 September, (the Feast of the Seven Sorrows of the Virgin Mary), 1951. The encyclical states that from the beginning of his pontificate, Pope Pius XII entrusted to the Mother of God the destiny of the human family. The Pope strongly supports the idea, that Catholic families should pray the rosary together.

John Paul II Coat of arms with the Marian Cross

- Rosarium Virginis Mariae – This Apostolic Letter by Pope John Paul II was issued on 16 October 2002. It deals with the Holy Rosary and views it as compendium of the Gospel message: The Rosary, though clearly Marian in character, is at heart a Christocentric prayer. In the sobriety of its elements, it has all the depth of the Gospel message in its entirety, of which it can be said to be a compendium. The letter reaffirms the Roman Catholic beliefs on the power of the rosary and states: Through the Rosary the faithful receive abundant grace, as though from the very hands of the Mother of the Redeemer. Beginning with paragraph 19, Pope St. John Paul II introduces a new set of mysteries for meditation on the life of Christ into the traditional rosary; he calls them the Mysteries of Light or the Luminous Mysteries. These he adds after the Joyful Mysteries and before the Sorrowful and the Glorious Mysteries. The five Luminous Mysteries are: 1) The baptism of Jesus in the Jordan, 2) His self-manifestation at the wedding at Cana, 3) His proclamation of the Kingdom of God and the call to conversion, 4) His Transfiguration, and 5) His institution of the Eucharist.

== Sodality of Our Lady ==
- Gloriosae Dominae – by Pope Benedict XIV was issued on 27 September 1748. In this Apostolic Letter Pope Benedict XIV called the Blessed Virgin Mary "Queen of heaven and earth," stating that the sovereign King has in some way communicated to her his ruling power.
- Bis Saeculari – This Apostolic Constitution Sodality of Our Lady was promulgated by Pope Pius XII on 27 September 1948, the two hundredth anniversary of the Papal bull Gloriosae Dominae of Pope Benedict XIV in 1748. It is important because Apostolic constitutions are the highest form of Papal teaching, above encyclicals, and below dogmatization ex cathedra. The Sodality of Our Lady dates to 1584. It consists of associations of persons, sodalists, dedicated to a Christian life, following the model of the Virgin Mary. In Bis Saeculari, Pope Pius XII pointed to the importance of the Sodality of Our Lady within the Church, which after four hundred years exists in all countries. It has produced virtuous lives among the faithful, priests and saints. It continues to prepare women and men to be active in modern society.

== Other documents ==
- Signum Magnum – an Apostolic exhortation by Pope Paul VI issued My 13, 1967 on consecration to the Blessed Virgin Mary.
- Marialis Cultus – Pope Paul VI issued this Apostolic exhortation on 2 February 1974. The letter is subtitled, For the Right Ordering and Development of Devotion to the Blessed Virgin Mary. The document does not focus on specific themes in Mariology, but clarifies the way the Roman Catholic Church celebrates liturgies that commemorate Mary and about Marian devotion. The preparation of the document reportedly took four years.
- Redemptoris Mater – Pope John Paul II delivered this encyclical on 25 March 1987. It is subtitled On the Blessed Virgin Mary in the life of the Pilgrim Church. The encyclical discusses the special place of the Blessed Virgin Mary in the plan of salvation and continues to focus on Mary's role in the Mystery of Christ. In this encyclical Pope John Paul II confirmed the title, Mother of the Church, proclaimed by Pope Paul VI at the Second Vatican Council on 21 November 1964.

== Sources ==
- Pope Pius IX, Apostolic Constitution
- Pope Pius XII, encyclicals and bulls
  - Encyclical Le pèlerinage de Lourdes on the Vatican website
  - Encyclical Mystici Corporis Christi on the Vatican website
- Pope John Paul II, encyclical, apostolic letters and addresses
  - Pope John Paul II, Address to the Mariology Forum
