= Fulgens corona =

1953 encyclical regarding Mariology

Fulgens corona Latin for 'Radiant Crown' Encyclical of Pope Pius XII
- Signature date: 8 September 1953
- Number: 25 of the pontificate

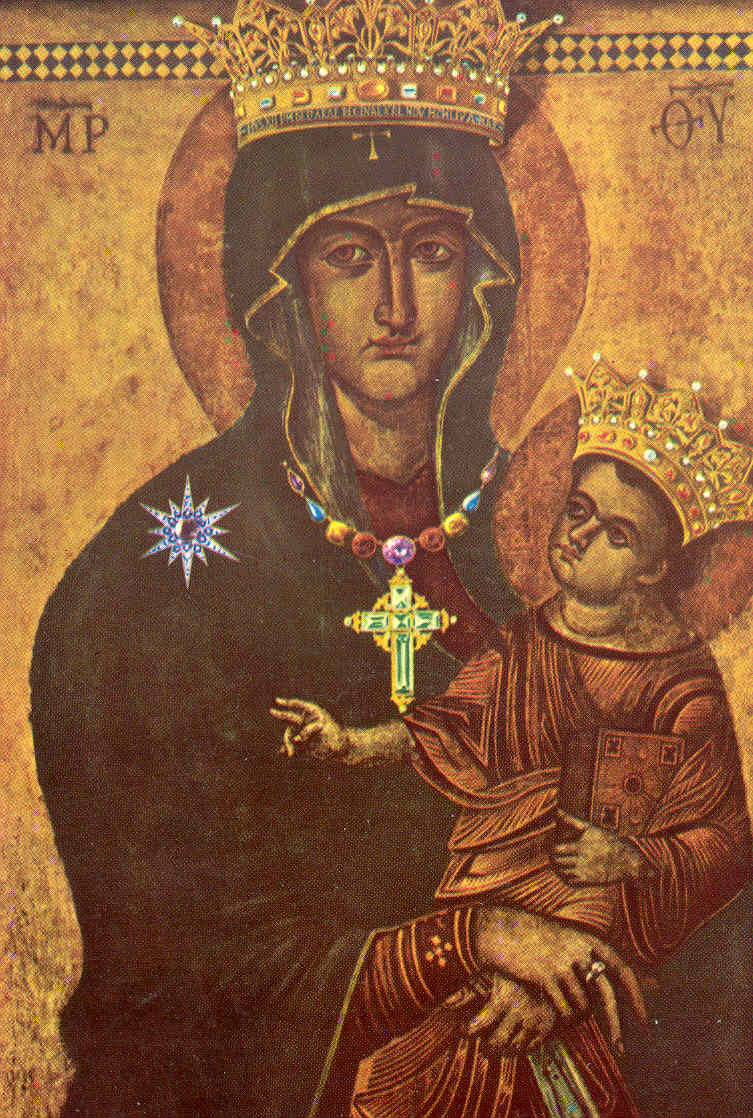
The crown inscription reads: Pius XII PM Deiparae Reginae Kal MCMIV A Mar. Pope Pius XII to the Queen Mother of God, Marian Year 1954

Fulgens corona ("Radiant Crown") is an encyclical by Pope Pius XII, given at St. Peter's, Rome, on 8 September 1953, the Feast of the Nativity of the Blessed Virgin Mary, in the fifteenth year of his Pontificate. The encyclical proclaims a Marian year for 1954, to commemorate the centenary of the definition of the dogma of the Immaculate Conception of the Virgin Mary.

Fulgens corona is significant as it contained the mariological methodology of Pope Pius XII and his views on limits and challenges of mariology.

== First Marian year ==
In September 1953, Pope Pius XII inaugurated the Roman Catholic Church's First Marian Year, or "Little Holy Year," devoted to the Virgin Mary who had always been the object of his special veneration. He announced the Marian Year in his encyclical letter Fulgens corona. The Marian year, the first in Church history, ran from December 1953 to December 1954, Hundreds of thousands of Romans lined the route of the papal cortege when Pius XII, in one of his rare appearances in the streets of Rome, went to the Basilica of St. Mary Major to open the Marian Year on 8 December 1953, the 99th anniversary of the proclaiming of the dogma of the Immaculate Conception of Mary by Pope Pius IX.

Pius XII begins by recalling his predecessor, Pope Pius IX, who with "apostolic authority defined, pronounced and solemnly sanctioned "that the doctrine, which holds that the Most Blessed Virgin Mary at the first moment of her conception was, by singular grace and privilege of the Omnipotent God, in virtue of the merits of Jesus Christ, Savior of the Human race, preserved from all stains of original sin, is revealed by God, and therefore to be firmly and resolutely believed by all the faithful." (Dogmatic bull Ineffabilis Deus, of Dec. 8, 1854.)"

The celebration also acknowledged the 1950 declaration of the Assumption of the Virgin Mary into Heaven. Pope Pius XII links the solemn definition of the Immaculate Conception with the dogma of the Assumption Mary, promulgated in Pius's apostolic constitution Munificentissimus Deus of November 1, 1950. To Pius, the two doctrines are complementary.

== Basic teachings ==
The Pope stated that the Blessed Virgin Mary, herself seemingly wished to confirm the definition, since less than four years after, in the French town of Lourdes, she appeared at the grotto of Massabielle. Pius XII traced the doctrine of the Immaculate Conception through Sacred Scripture and the early fathers. "[I]t is clearly apparent that there is only one among all holy men and women about whom it can be said that the question of sin does not even arise, and also that she obtained this singular privilege, never granted to anyone else, because she was raised to the dignity of Mother of God". "[A]ny honor and veneration which we may give to our Heavenly Mother undoubtedly redounds to the glory of her Divine Son, not only because all graces and all gifts, even the highest, flow from Him as from their primary source".

Pope Pius XII invited all Catholics to celebrate the Marian Year to be held the whole world over from the month of December 1953 until the same month of the coming year, and urged them to be mindful "that she repeats to each of us those words, with which she addressed the servers at the wedding feast of Cana, pointing as it were to Jesus Christ: "Whatsoever He shall say to you, do ye" (John. 2. 5)

He further noted that in many places, Catholic clergy are "banished, or thrown into prison without just cause, or else are so harassed that they are unable to carry out their duties properly... in those same places they are not allowed to have their own schools and training colleges, that they cannot publicly teach, defend or propagate Christian doctrine in periodicals or commentaries, and cannot properly train the youth in accordance with the same doctrine." He asks for worldwide special prayers, that the sacred rights which are proper to the Church, and which the very exercise of human and civil liberty demands, may be openly and sincerely recognized by all.

== Quote ==
"And so these two very singular privileges, bestowed upon the Virgin Mother of God, stand out in most splendid light as the beginning and as the end of her earthly journey; for the greatest possible glorification of her virgin body is the complement, at once appropriate and marvelous, of the absolute innocence of her soul, which was free from all stain; and just as she took part in the struggle of her only-begotten Son with the wicked serpent of Hell, so also she shared in His glorious triumph over sin and its sad consequences."

== See also ==
- Ad Caeli Reginam
- Marian papal encyclicals and Apostolic Letters

== Pope Pius XII, Mariological encyclicals and bulls ==
  - Encyclical Deiparae Virginis Mariae on the Vatican website
  - Encyclical Ingruentium malorum on the Vatican website
  - Encyclical Mystici Corporis Christi on the Vatican website
  - Apostolic Constitution Munificentissimus Deus on the Vatican website
- Acta Apostolicae Sedis. (AAS), Vatican City 1939-1958. Official documents of the Pontificate of Pope Pius XII, Fulgens corona 1953, 577

== Bibliography ==
- "Fulgens corona". Pius XII Encyclicals. Libreria Editrice Vaticana.
