= Ubi primum (1849) =

Papal encyclical on the Immaculate Conception

Ubi primum Encyclical of Pope Pius IX
- Signature date: February 2, 1849
- Subject: On Immaculate Conception
- Number: 5 of the pontificate, 41 of the total
- Text: In original language

Ubi primum (Latin for "When first" or "As soon as," the opening words of the encyclical) is an encyclical sent by Pope Pius IX, then in Gaeta, to the bishops of the Catholic Church, asking them to ascertain the opinion of their flock on the definition of a dogma on the Immaculate Conception of the Virgin Mary. It was issued on February 2, 1849.

== Background ==
In the 19th century, there was an increase in veneration of Mary under the title "Immaculata". In France, Archbishop de Quélen of Paris actively promoted the devotion of the Miraculous Medal. In 1843 the title "Queen conceived without original sin" was added to the Litany of Loreto, partly through the efforts of Antonio Rosmini, founder of the Institute of Charity. That same year, the twenty-three bishops present at the Sixth Provincial Council of Baltimore chose "Mary conceived without sin" as the patron saint of the United States.

== Development ==
In 1848 Pius IX established a commission of theologians, to study the subject and report their opinion. Rosmini, who served as a consultor on the commission, suggested that the Holy See should solicit views from the whole of Church through an encyclical to the bishops. Ubi primum seeks the opinions of the bishops on the question.

The title "Ubi primum" derives from the opening words of the encyclical ("When first" or "As soon as"; or in Latin, "Ubi primum")

== Content ==
Pius begins by acknowledging the numerous requests received by both his predecessor, Pope Gregory XVI, as well as himself for a declaration of the dogma.

We eagerly desire, furthermore, that, as soon as possible, you apprise Us concerning the devotion which animates your clergy and your people regarding the Immaculate Conception of the Blessed Virgin and how ardently glows the desire that this doctrine be defined by the Apostolic See. And especially, Venerable Brethren, We wish to know what you yourselves, in your wise judgment, think and desire on this matter.

== Response ==
Over 600 bishops responded, almost all favorably. The positive response to Ubi primum led to the 1854 bull Ineffabilis Deus, which defined the dogma of the Immaculate Conception. In April 1850, Dom Prosper Guéranger, abbot of St. Peter's Abbey, Solesmes, published Mémoire sur l'Immaculée Conception demonstrating why belief in the Immaculate Conception might be the object of a dogmatic definition.

This approach was quoted by Pope Pius XII in 1946, when in Deiparae Virginis Mariae, he inquired from the bishops about a possible dogma of the Assumption of the Virgin Mary.

== See also ==
- Ad diem illum
- Fulgens corona
- Ineffabilis Deus
- List of encyclicals of Pope Pius IX
- Mariological papal documents
