= Bis saeculari =

Bis saeculari (September 27, 1948), is an apostolic constitution, of Pope Pius XII on the Sodality of Our Lady issued to mark the two hundredth anniversary of the Papal bull Gloriosae Dominae of Pope Benedict XIV in 1748.

Apostolic constitutions are the highest form of papal teaching, above encyclicals, below dogmatization ex cathedra. The Sodality of Our Lady dates to 1584. It consists of associations of persons, sodalists, dedicated to a Christian life, following the model of the Virgin Mary.

== Importance to the Church ==
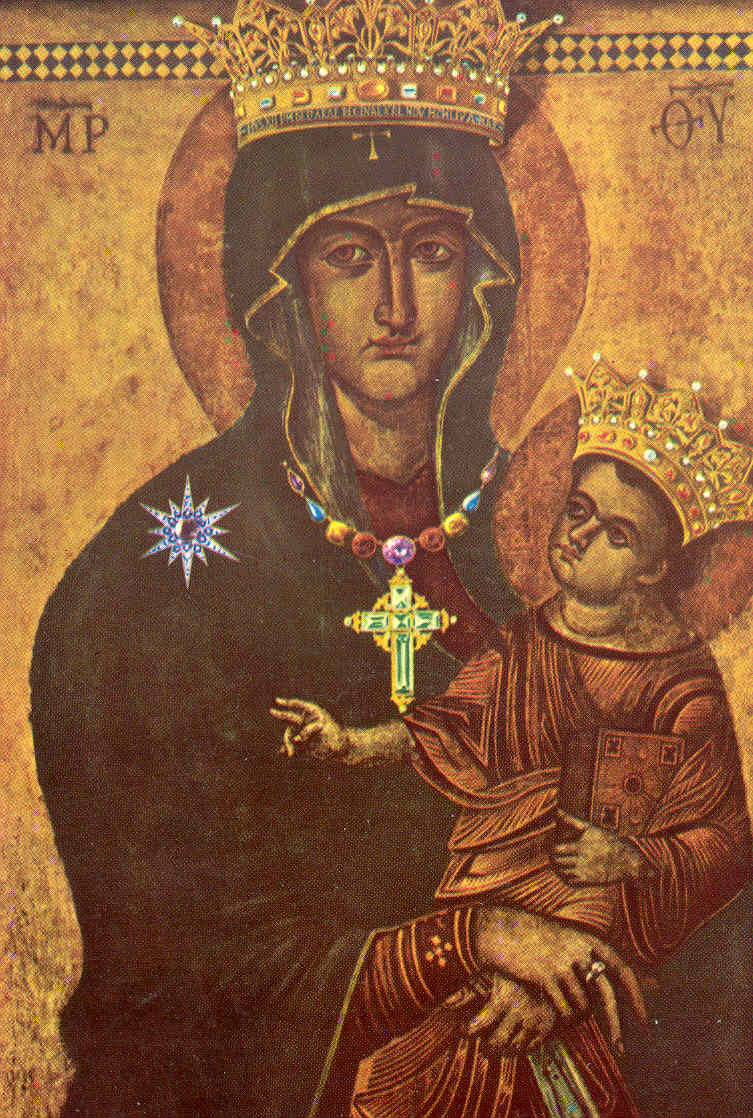
The Salus Populi Romani was venerated by Marian sodalities. A rare picture of Salus Populi Romani crowned for the Marian year 1954 by Pope Pius XII

Pope Pius XII expressed his support of the Marian Congregations. He described the Sodality as authentic "Catholic Action under the auspices and inspiration of the Blessed Virgin Mary" and called for its renewal in the post war era. The Pope established guidelines for the lay apostolate.

Pope Pius praised the Sodality for its "numerous and great services to the Church" and says of Sodalists "Indeed in propagating, spreading and defending Catholic doctrine they must be considered among the most powerful spiritual forces". Of the Rules of the Sodality he says "through them the members are perfectly lead to that perfection of spiritual life from which they can scale the heights of sanctity" and adds that "wherever Sodalities are in a flourishing condition - holiness of life and solid attachment to religion readily grow and flourish". He illustrates the point by adding that "the fact that they ever had the common good of the Church at heart and not some private interest is proved by the unimpeachable witness of that most brilliant series of Sodalists to whom Mother Church has decreed the supreme honours of the Altars; their glory throws lustre not merely on the Society of Jesus but on the secular clergy and on not a few religious families, since ten members of the Sodalities of Our Lady became founders of new Religious Orders and Congregations".

Because of their loyalty to the Church, they are welcome helpers of the hierarchies. In the future, twelve principles should be observed for sodalities to continue as an effective Church organization. The principles describe the continued value of existing rules, membership based on strict selections, Marian orientation not only in name, leadership by priests, clear but limited rights for priests and bishops, religious education of its members, and, cooperation with other lay organizations.

Bis saeculari had the effect of reinvigorating the movement, eventually leading to formation of national and international federations.

== Quotations ==
- Any kind of apostolate belongs to the goals of sodalities, especially social obligations, the spreading of the kingdom of Christ, and the defence of the rights of the Church.
- The “perfect Catholic” formed by the Sodality, corresponds to the needs of our days no less than in previous times. More than ever before, we need men formed in the principles of Christian life.
- Sodalists should only be accepted, if they are in no way content with an average way of living. They should desire to climb the steep cliffs in their hearts, according to the rules, ascetic guidelines and exercises.
- It is the task of the sodality to train its sodalists so they may become a model of Christian and apostolic life to their fellow men.

== See also ==
- Consecration and entrustment to Mary
- Marian papal encyclicals and Apostolic Letters

== Sources ==
- Text of Bis saeculari
