= Sodality of Our Lady =

Jesuit founded Roman Catholic Marian Society for lay members

The Sodality of Our Lady, also known as the Sodality of the Blessed Virgin Mary (in Latin, Congregationes seu sodalitates B. Mariæ Virginis), is a Roman Catholic Marian society founded in 1563 by young Belgian Jesuit Jean Leunis (or Jan) at the Roman College of the Society of Jesus. The modern Ignatian lay group Christian Life Community traces its origins to the first Sodality.

Although first established for young school boys, by the papal bull Superna Dispositione, sodalities for adults, under the authority of the Superior General of the Society of Jesus, were allowed to be established (as aggregates of the sodality at the Roman College). Later on, Sodalities would be established for particular groups in society, such as Priests, Noblemen and Women, Merchants, Labourers, Clerks, the Married, the Unmarried, Soldiers, and Street sodalities (ad infinitum). Each of these groups would be affiliated with the "Prima-Primaria Sodality" of the Roman College, which met at the Oratory of San Francesco Saverio del Caravita.

== History ==
=== Foundations ===
The Jesuit historian John W. O'Malley wrote of the foundations of the Sodality in his book The First Jesuits that "It was... made up especially of younger boys (pueri) from the [Roman] college, who agreed to daily Mass, weekly confession, monthly Communion, as well as to a half-hour of meditation each day and to some other pious exercises. They would also 'serve the poor.'" He goes on to write that "[t]he choice of Mary as patron reflected the strong Marian element in Leunis's personal piety, but it was also probably considered appropriate for the age of the members."

In 1569 a division of the sodality in the Roman College became necessary on account of the large number of members. The older pupils, those over eighteen years of age, formed a sodality for themselves, while the younger were formed into another. Soon there were three sodalities in the Roman College. In 1584, the Roman Sodality was made an archsodality by the Bull, Omnipotentis Dei of Gregory XIII.

Wherever the Society of Jesus went to establish colleges or missions, a sodality of the Blessed Virgin was soon erected in that place. In all the larger cities of Europe where the Jesuits established themselves firmly, they founded not merely one, but as many as seven or even twenty different sodalities. During the period that the sodalities were connected with the houses and churches of the Jesuits the membership rose to many hundred thousands.

In 1587, following a request from the Society of Jesus, Pope Sixtus V issued the Papal bull Superna Dispositione, which gave the Superior General of the Society of Jesus the right to create aggregates of the first Congregation within other localities, even among persons who were not enrolled in a Jesuit school or University. As a result of this document, lay Congregations, such as the Ignatian Christian Life Community (since 1967), and "Marianische Frauencongregation" or "Ladies' Sodality of Our Lady" in Germany, derive their beginnings.

=== 17th century ===
In the late 16th century and throughout the 17th, Jesuits were using the model of the first sodality at the Roman College to establish a number of similar sodalities in Europe, India, and the Americas as organisations of lay spirituality. The first Sodality of Our Lady in Canada was established by the Jesuits in Quebec in 1657.

Similar models, although not aggregates of the "Prima Primaria", were the confrarias (or Confraternities) founded by the Jesuits in Japan. Within a few years of their arrival in 1549, the Jesuits had established lay communities of Catholic faithful. According to O'Malley, "Eventually [they] had male and female branches and devoted themselves to both the corporal and spiritual works of mercy. When the persecutions started in the seventeenth century (see Toyotomi Hideyoshi), [the Confraternities] proved to be the underground institution in which Christian faith and practices were maintained and transmitted to the next generation. The leader of the confraternity acted as a lay pastor."

About a century later, in 1748, Pope Benedict XIV, with the papal bull Praeclaris Romanorum, attempted to renew the vigour of life in congregations. For 167 years sodalities had been open only to men. Then in 1751 Benedict gave permission for sodalities of married women and girls, leading to a great increase in membership. Another jump in membership came when, in 1825, Pope Leo XII granted affiliation to sodalities not under Jesuit direction.

=== After the suppression of the Society of Jesus ===
In 1767, the Society of Jesus was expelled from Latin America, and in 1773, with the suppression of the Jesuits by Pope Clement XIV through the brief Dominus ac Redemptor, the congregations "become one of the normal works of the universal Church." The Society of Jesus was re-established in 1814, and Leo XII restored to the Jesuit general his old rights and privileges as regards the sodalities of the Blessed Virgin by a brief of 17 May 1824. In 1825, Pope Leo XII granted affiliation to sodalities not under Jesuit direction. By 1854 there were over 4,000 sodalities throughout the world.

=== Papal blessing ===
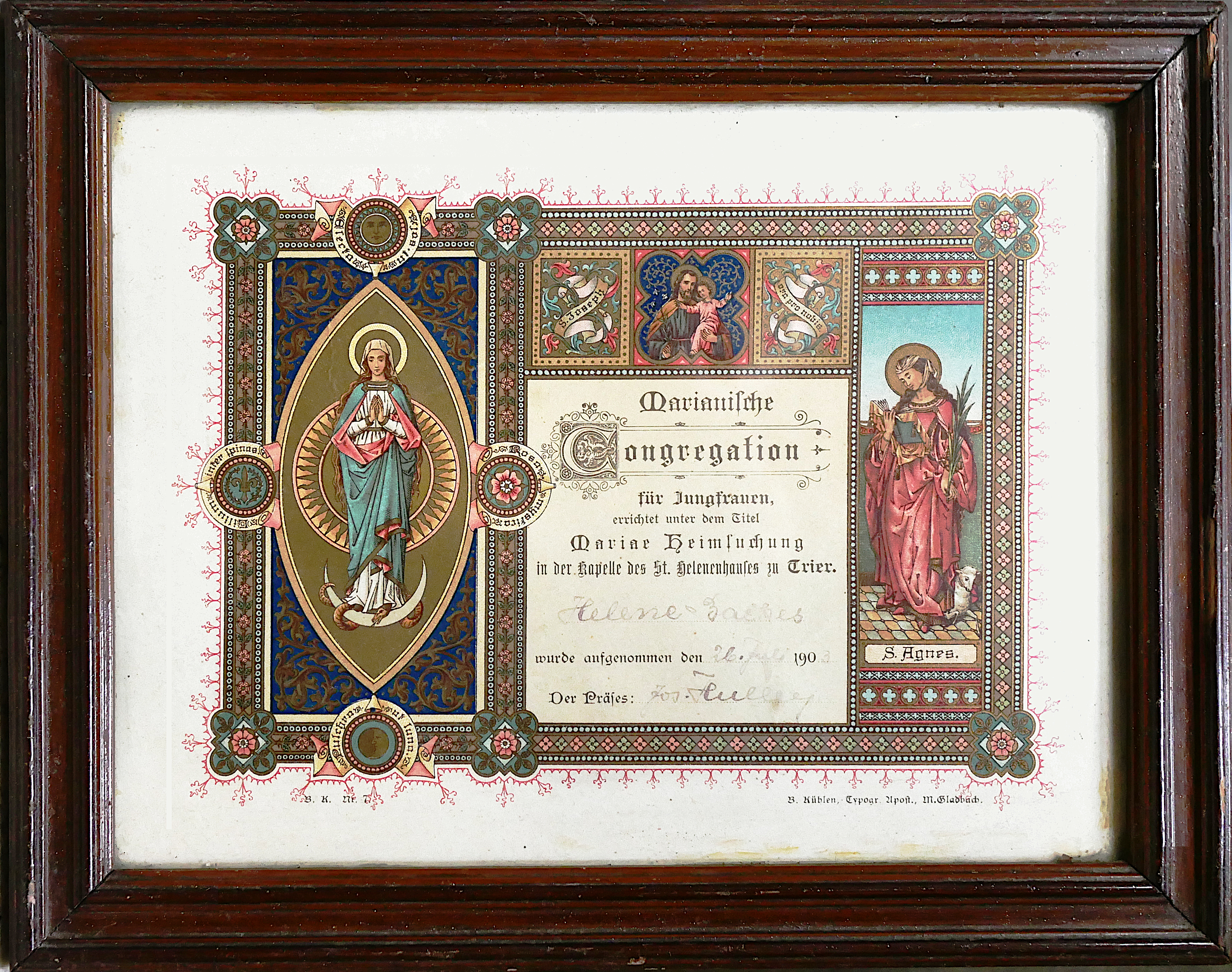
The admission certificate of the Virgins Congregation Trier in neo-Romanesque style

In 1748, Pope Benedict XIV made a special gift to the Sodality, in the form of a Papal bull called Gloriosae Dominae, which came to be known as the "Golden Bull" because the seal was not made of lead, as was customary, but of gold, in order to give special honour to the Mother of God. In addition, Pope Pius XII, through the apostolic constitution Bis Saeculari (1948), gave special honour to the Sodality of Our Lady by summarising its history and relevance.

==== Apostolic Constitution Bis Saeculari ====
Pope Pius XII issued the Apostolic Constitution Bis Saeculari on 27 September 1948, to mark the 200th anniversary of the "Golden Bull" of Benedict XIV. Bis Saeculari praised the Sodality for its "numerous and great services to the Church" and said of the sodalists that "Indeed in propagating, spreading and defending Catholic doctrine they must be considered among the most powerful spiritual forces." Of the Rules of the Sodality he said: "Through them the members are perfectly led to that perfection of spiritual life from which they can scale the heights of sanctity" and adds that "wherever Sodalities are in a flourishing condition, holiness of life and solid attachment to religion readily grow and flourish." He illustrates the point by adding that "the fact that they always had the common good of the Church at heart and not some private interest is proved by the unimpeachable witness of that most brilliant series of sodalists to whom Mother Church has decreed the supreme honours of the Altars; their glory throws lustre not merely on the Society of Jesus but on the secular clergy and on not a few religious families, since ten members of the sodalities of Our Lady became founders of new religious orders and congregations."

== The Children of Mary (associated group) ==
On May 1, 1835, St. Catherine Laboure told her Spiritual Director of a revelation she had received from the Blessed Virgin Mary during a series of apparitions she received in the Convent of the Rue du Bac, Paris, from 1830: "It is the Blessed Virgin's wish that you should found a Confraternity of the Children of Mary. She will give them many graces. The month of May will be kept with great splendour and Mary will bestow abundant blessings upon them."

These Children of Mary Sodalities first embraced the pupils and orphans of the schools and institutions of the Sisters of Charity of St Vincent de Paul. In 1847, Blessed Pius IX affiliated them to the Jesuit Roman Sodality. The badge adopted by the Children of Mary Immaculate (as they are also called) is the miraculous medal, suspended from a blue ribbon.

The Children of Mary organization flourished in the mid 20th century. Young women went through a period of aspirancy of six months prior to acceptance as a fully-fledged child of Mary, who had the right to wear the distinctive blue cape. When a child of Mary married, she was embraced on arrival on the Church steps by other Children of Mary who removed the blue cape from over her wedding gown.

== Sodality Rules ==
The first of its rules states that the Sodality "is a religious body which aims at fostering in its members an ardent devotion, reverence, and filial love towards the Blessed Virgin Mary. Through this devotion, and with the protection of so good a mother, it seeks to make the faithful gathered together under her name good Catholics, sincerely bent on sanctifying themselves, each in his state of life, and zealous, as for as their condition in life permits, to save and sanctify their neighbour and to defend the Church of Jesus Christ against the attacks of the wicked."

== Post-Vatican II and the advent of Christian Life Communities ==
Until the establishment of the Christian Life Communities in 1967, the Sodality of Our Lady remained the Ignatian lay organisation. The Christian Life Community maintains that following the suppression of the Society of Jesus, "In the eighteenth century membership increase[d] vastly, from 2,500 groups to 80,000. The consequence [was] a diminishment in fervour and practice. The spiritual life of the members and the social concern for the rejected of society [was] reduced to pious practices and annual and symbolic events. The Marian Congregations [became] a pious mass movement, different from what Ignatius or Jean Leunis or Aquaviva had meant it to be."

Those who still form part of the "Marian Congregations", such as the 'Marianische Frauencongregation' of Regensburg, Germany, would argue otherwise. While some Marian sodalities do not explicitly follow Ignatian spirituality, they continue to encourage corporal and spiritual works of mercy, and believe their devotional practices worthy of merit.

With the formation of the CLC, the former World Federation of Sodalities ceased to exist. Some parish sodalities opted either not to join the CLC or subsequently withdrew. These sodalities have no central organization; each sodality is autonomous. There are three diocesan unions of sodalities: in New York, Baltimore, and Washington, D.C.

== Notable members ==
- Kate Walker Behan (1851-1918), American club leader and philanthropist
- Heinrich Maier, Austrian resistance fighter chaplain
- Jan Karski, World War II-era Polish courier and Righteous Among the Nations

== Saints ==
On its rolls are the names of many saints, amongst whom may be mentioned: Saint Charles Borromeo, the zealous reformer of church discipline; Saint Alphonsus Liguori, the Bishop, moral theologian, Doctor of the Church, Founder of the Redemptorists; St. Camillus de Lellis, the patron of Catholic hospitals; Saint Giovanni Battista de Rossi, the Vincent de Paul of Rome; St. Peter Claver, the apostle of slaves; the humble Jesuit Brother St. Alphonsus Rodriguez; Saint Madeleine Sophie Barat, foundress of the Religious of the Sacred Heart; Saint Julie Billart, the foundress of the Sisters of Notre Dame of Namur; Saint Therese of the Child Jesus; and Saint Bernadette Soubirous of Lourdes.

For six years St. Francis de Sales worked, during his student life, in the sodality of the College of Clermont at Paris as member, assistant, and prefect. Other members were: St. Stanislaus Kostka, John Berchmans, St. Fidelis of Sigmaringen, Franciscan preacher St. Leonard of Port Maurice, St. Peter Fourier, St. John Baptist de Rossi, and Jean Eudes.
