= Sponsa Christi =

1950 apostolic constitution

Sponsa Christi Latin for 'The Spouse of Christ' Apostolic constitution of Pope Pius XII
- Signature date: 21 November 1950
- Text: In Latin

Sponsa Christi ("Spouse of Christ") is an Apostolic Constitution issued by Pope Pius XII on the Feast of the Presentation, November 21, 1950. It addresses the vocation of nuns to a life of virginity.

== Characteristics of the consecrated life ==
The first part of the constitution deals with the historical development of monastic monasteries for women from groups of consecrated virgins and widows of the early church, and in particular the contemplative life. Pius XII describes the characteristics of the consecrated life of cloistered nuns, as this document was addressed to them.

For nuns the service of the liturgy is essential. The word of God and the liturgy are the sources from which the nuns are to draw, to know the will of God and to bind themselves to him in freedom and in love. In the same part, the Pope sets out the provisions governing nuns' examinations. With this constitution fixed rules for religious communities are established.

Pope Pius cited Sponsa Christi in the March 25, 1954, encyclical Sacra Virginitas as showing the importance of the office consecrated men and women fulfill in the Church.

== Foundations of Canon Law ==
The second part specifies the statutes valid according to canon law:

- Article I. §§ 1-3 Establishment of religious orders for women
- Article II. §§ 1-3 Special Forms of Monastic Religious Life
- Article III. §§ 1-3 Affiliation and virgin consecration for eligible nuns
- Article IV. §§ 1-5 Big and small papal examinations
- Article V. §§ 1-4 Commitment to the public celebration of the Liturgy of the Hours in chorus
- Article VI. §§ 1-3 Hierarchy and Order in Women's Monasteries
- Article VII. §§ 1-3 Authorization procedure by the Holy See
- Article VIII. §§ 1-3 Monastic work for the maintenance of the monasteries
- Article IX. Final provisions and exhortatio for strict compliance with these regulations

By the June 29, 2016, Apostolic Constitution Vultum Dei quaerere (on women's contemplative life), Pope Francis repealed the Statuta generalia monialium ("General statutes concerning nuns").
