= Munificentissimus Deus =

Apostolic constitution by Pope Pius XII

Munificentissimus Deus Latin for 'The most bountiful God' Apostolic constitution of Pope Pius XII
- Signature date: 1 November 1950
- Subject: Ex cathedra definition of the Assumption of the Blessed Virgin Mary as a dogma
- Text: In Latin; In English

Munificentissimus Deus (Latin: The most bountiful God) is an apostolic constitution published in 1950 by Pope Pius XII. It defines ex cathedra the dogma of the Assumption of the Blessed Virgin Mary. It was the first and thus far the only ex-cathedra infallible statement since the official ruling on papal infallibility was made at the First Vatican Council (1869–1870). In 1854 Pope Pius IX had made an infallible statement with Ineffabilis Deus on the Immaculate Conception of the Virgin Mary, which was a basis for this dogma.

== Dogma of the Assumption ==
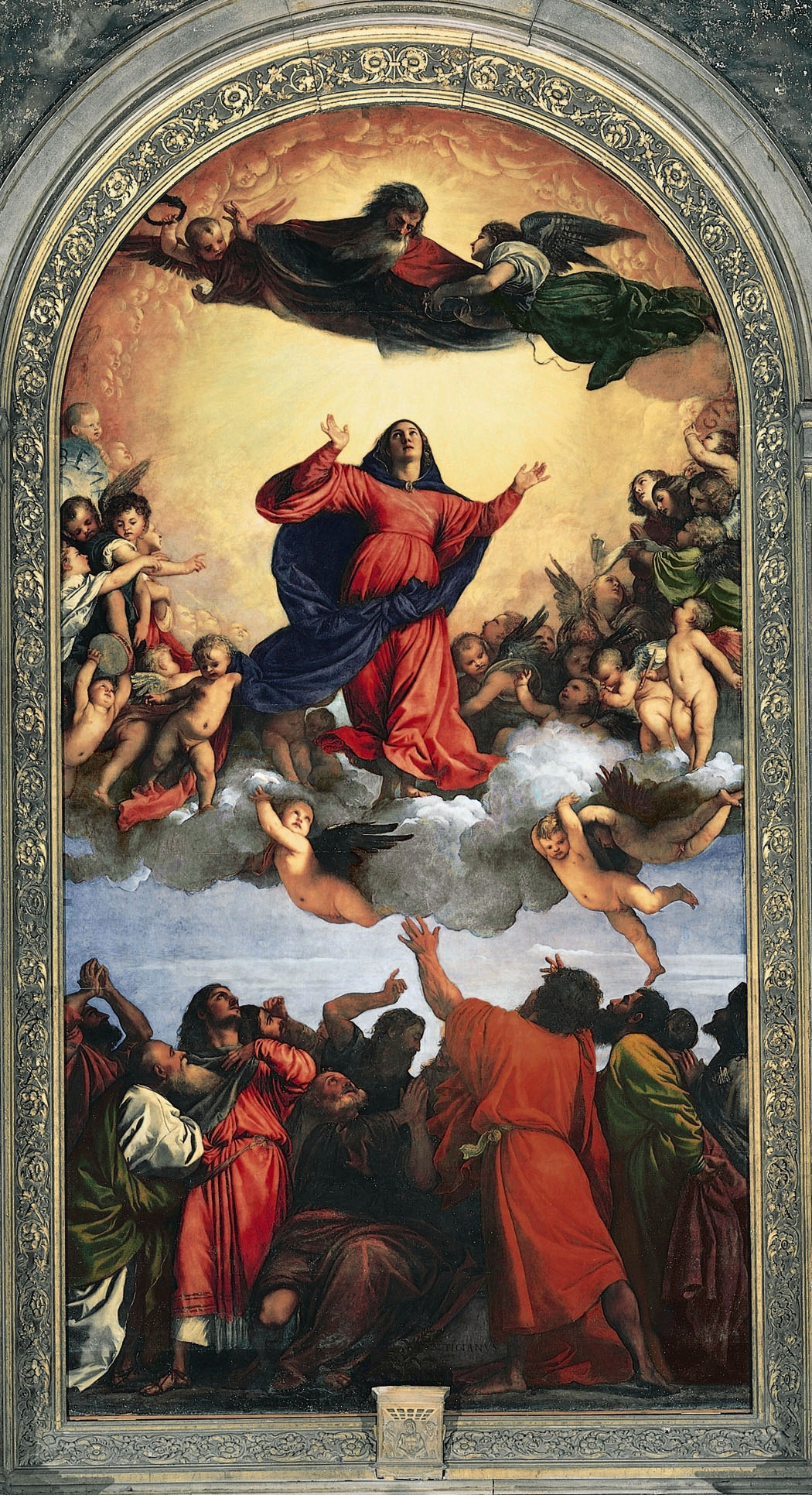
Titian's Assumption of the Virgin (Basilica di Santa Maria Gloriosa, Venice)

On 1 November 1950, invoking his dogmatic authority, Pope Pius XII defined the dogma:

By the authority of our Lord Jesus Christ, of the Blessed Apostles Peter and Paul, and by our own authority, we pronounce, declare, and define it to be a divinely revealed dogma: that the Immaculate Mother of God, the ever Virgin Mary, having completed the course of her earthly life, was assumed body and soul into heavenly glory.

== Historical background ==
Pope Pius XII's previous encyclical Deiparae Virginis Mariae (1 May 1946) to all Catholic bishops stated that for a long time past, numerous petitions had been received from cardinals, patriarchs, archbishops, bishops, priests, religious of both sexes, associations, universities and innumerable private persons, all begging that the bodily Assumption into heaven of the Blessed Virgin should be defined and proclaimed as a dogma of faith. This was also fervently requested by almost two hundred fathers in the First Vatican Council (1869–1870).

Following the example of Pope Pius IX, who canvassed Catholic bishops before proclaiming the dogma of the Immaculate Conception, Pius XII asked all bishops for their opinion.

Actually God, who from all eternity regards Mary with a most favorable and unique affection, has "when the fullness of time came" put the plan of his providence into effect in such a way that all the privileges and prerogatives he had granted to her in his sovereign generosity were to shine forth in her in a kind of perfect harmony. And, although the Church has always recognized this supreme generosity and the perfect harmony of graces and has daily studied them more and more throughout the course of the centuries, still it is in our own age that the privilege of the bodily Assumption into heaven of Mary, the Virgin Mother of God, has certainly shone forth more clearly.

At issue was not the belief in the Assumption, but its dogmatisation. By August 1950, 1191 bishops had responded. Munificentissimus Deus reports popular acclaim and "nearly unanimous" approval of the contemporary bishops. The names of the bishops attending the dogma celebration in 1950 are listed at the entrance of St. Peter's Basilica.

== Review of Catholic beliefs ==
Reflecting on the history of this belief in Catholic Christian tradition, Pope Pius XII writes that "the holy Fathers and Doctors of the Church have never failed to draw enlightenment from this fact." Munificentissimus Deus reviews the history of Catholic liturgy and the many liturgical books "which deal with the feast either of the Dormition or of the Assumption of the Blessed Virgin". Munificentissimus Deus cites also the teaching of previous popes and bishops and such writers as John of Damascus, Francis de Sales, Robert Bellarmine, Anthony of Padua, and Albert the Great, among others.

Georges Tavard wrote: "In the theology of Pope Pius XII, the Assumption of Mary's body and soul into heaven flow from her Immaculate Conception. The end balances the beginning, both having their profound reason in Mary's mission as the Theotokos."

The document does not state that the assumption into heaven in body and soul was an exclusive privilege of the Virgin Mary and Jesus. Some scholars and saints believe that Saint Joseph, Saint John the Baptist, among other saints. This view was also recalled by Pope John XXIII.

== Relevance to the faithful ==
Written not long after the devastation of World War II, the encyclical conveys the hope that meditation on Mary’s assumption will lead the faithful to a greater awareness of our common dignity as the human family. In the dogmatic statement, the phrase "having completed the course of her earthly life" was carefully written to leave open the question of whether or not Mary died before her Assumption, or whether, like the Assumption of the Prophet Elijah, Mary was assumed before death; both possibilities are allowed in the formulation. In articles 14, 17 and 20 of the dogmatic pronouncement, however, it is stated that Mary had indeed died: "the dead body of the Blessed Virgin Mary remained incorrupt, but ... she gained a triumph out of death, her heavenly glorification after the example of her only begotten Son, Jesus Christ."

The entire decree (and the title itself) is also worded to suggest that Mary's Assumption was not in any sense a logical necessity, but rather a divine gift to Mary as Mother of God. Munificentissimus Deus teaches that Mary lived and completed her life as a shining example to the human race. The gift of her assumption is offered to all the faithful and signifies what to hope for at the end of time. Her assumption signifies God's intention to all the faithful.

Thus, while the illusory teachings of materialism and the corruption of morals that follows from these teachings threaten to extinguish the light of virtue and to ruin the lives of men by exciting discord among them, in this magnificent way all may see clearly to what a lofty goal our bodies and souls are destined. Finally it is our hope that belief in Mary's bodily Assumption into heaven will make our belief in our own resurrection stronger and render it more effective. (article 42)

== Marian seers and the dogma of Assumption ==
On 1 May 1950 Gilles Bouhours (a marian seer) reported to Pius XII a presumed message that the Virgin Mary would have ordered him to communicate to the pope on the dogma of the Assumption of the Holy Virgin Mary. It is said that Pius XII asked God, during the Holy Year of 1950, for a sign that could reassure him that the dogma of the Assumption of the Virgin Mary was actually wanted by God and when Gilles communicated the message to Pius XII, the pope considered this message the hoped-for sign. Six months after the private audience granted to Gilles by the pope, Pius XII himself proclaimed the dogma of the Assumption of body and soul of the Blessed Virgin Mary into Heaven.

== Non-Catholic opinion ==
Paul Tillich asked fellow Protestant theologian Reinhold Niebuhr in March 1950, about eight months before the decree was promulgated, if he expected the Pope to make the declaration about Mary's assumption ex cathedra. Niebuhr replied: "I don't think so; he is too clever for that; it would be a slap in the face of the whole modern world and it would be dangerous for the Roman Church to do that today".

Among the Eastern Orthodox and Miaphysite Oriental Orthodox Churches, the doctrine of the Dormition of the Theotokos is different from, but theoretically compatible with, the Assumption. The doctrine of the Dormition specifically holds that Mary was dead when her body was taken to Heaven; the Catholic doctrine of the Assumption announced by Munificentissimus Deus carefully avoids the question, saying only that she was taken bodily to Heaven, thereby allowing Catholics to believe that she was alive or that she was dead.

Carl Jung, in the final chapters of his 1952 book Answer to Job, called the dogma "the most important religious event since the Reformation". He chastized its Protestant critics for overlooking its real psychological significance. Namely, Jung saw it as the manifestation of a culminating desire for completion in the Christian psyche; recognizing the feminine side of the divine would ease the inevitable incarnation of the Holy Ghost in humanity.

== See also ==
- Marian papal encyclicals and Apostolic Letters
