= Ad diem illum =

1904 encyclical on Mariology

Ad diem illum laetissimum Latin for 'On that most happy day' Encyclical of Pope Pius X
- Signature date: 2 February 1904
- Subject: Immaculate Conception
- Number: 2 of 17 of the pontificate
- Text: In Latin; In English

Ad diem illum laetissimum is an encyclical of Pope Pius X on the Immaculate Conception, dated 2 February 1904, in the first year of his Pontificate. It is issued in commemoration of the fiftieth anniversary of the dogma of the Immaculate Conception. The first reason for Pius to write the encyclical was his desire for "the restoration of all things in Christ", which he had defined as his motto in his first encyclical letter. It explains the Mariology of Pius X.

== Content ==
Pius states that "nobody ever knew Christ so profoundly as she did, and nobody can ever be more competent as a guide and teacher of the knowledge of Christ". He explained that Mary is the Mother of Christ and therefore she is our Mother also.

Now the Blessed Virgin did not conceive the Eternal Son of God merely in order that He might be made man taking His human nature from her, but also in order that by means of the nature assumed from her He might be the Redeemer of men....Wherefore in the same holy bosom of his most chaste Mother Christ took to Himself flesh, and united to Himself the spiritual body formed by those who were to believe in Him. Hence Mary, carrying the Savior within her, may be said to have also carried all those whose life was contained in the life of the Savior. Therefore all we who are united to Christ, and as the Apostle says are members of His body, of His flesh, and of His bones (Ephes. v., 30), have issued from the womb of Mary like a body united to its head. Hence, though in a spiritual and mystical fashion, we are all children of Mary, and she is Mother of us all. Mother, spiritually indeed, but truly Mother of the members of Christ, who are we (S. Aug. L. de S. Virginitate, c. 6).

=== To restore everything in Christ through Mary ===
Quoting Pope Pius IX in Ineffabilis Deus, Pius X reiterated that, "Jesus "sitteth on the right hand of the majesty on high" (Hebrews i. b.). Mary sitteth at the right hand of her Son - a refuge so secure and a help so trusty against all dangers that we have nothing to fear or to despair of under her guidance, her patronage, her protection. (Pius IX. in Bull Ineffabilis)."

In light of his pontifical motto, “Omnia restaurare in Christo” to restore everything in Christ, Pius X in the encyclical promotes worldwide Marian devotions, stating, that "no honouring is more pleasing to Mary, none she likes better, than the one in which we truly recognize and love Jesus." He cautions, "But unless heart and will be added, they will all be empty forms, mere appearances of piety. At such a spectacle, the Virgin, borrowing the words of Jesus Christ, would address us with the just reproach: "This people honoureth me with their lips, but their heart is far from me" (Matth. xv., 8)."

Whoever wishes, that his devotion should be worthy of her, should go further and strive might and main to imitate her example. The Pontiff declared that those only attain everlasting happiness who have by such following reproduced in themselves the patience and sanctity of Jesus Christ.

=== The Immaculate Conception ===
Many modern men deny that mankind has fallen by sin, believing that the concept original sin, and all the evils that were allegedly its consequence, are pure imaginations. With this rejection, there is logically "no place left for Christ, for the Church, for grace or for anything that is above and beyond nature; in one word the whole edifice of faith is shaken from top to bottom. But let people believe and confess that the Virgin Mary has been from the first moment of her conception preserved from all stain; and it is straightaway necessary that they should admit both original sin and the rehabilitation of the human race by Jesus Christ, the Gospel, and the Church and the law of suffering". The dogma of the Immaculate Conception is the answer, by its obligation "of recognizing in the Church a power before which (mankind ) not only has the will to bow, but the intelligence to subject itself". The Virgin, according to Pius, was kept the more free from all stain of original sin because she was to be the mother of Christ; and she was the mother of Christ so that the hope of everlasting happiness might be born again in our souls.

== See also ==
- Marian papal encyclicals and Apostolic Letters

== Sources ==
- Pope Pius X (February 2, 1904), Ad diem Illum Laetissimum
