= Deiparae Virginis Mariae =

1946 papal encyclical

Deiparae Virginis Mariae Latin for 'Virgin Mary Mother of God' Encyclical of Pope Pius XII
- Signature date: 1 May 1946
- Subject: the possibility of defining the Assumption of the Virgin Mary as a dogma of faith
- Text: In Latin; In English

Deiparae Virginis Mariae (Latin for "Virgin Mary Mother of God"), is an encyclical of Pope Pius XII released on 1 May 1946 addressed to all Catholic bishops on the possibility of defining the Assumption of the Blessed Virgin Mary as a dogma of faith.

The encyclical states that for a long time numerous petitions have been received from cardinals, patriarchs, archbishops, bishops, priests, religious of both sexes, associations, universities and innumerable private persons, all begging that the bodily Assumption into heaven of the Blessed Virgin should be defined and proclaimed as a dogma of faith. This was also fervently requested by almost two hundred fathers in the First Vatican Council (1869–1870).

Following the example of Pope Pius IX, who with his encyclical Ubi Primum canvassed Catholic bishops before proclaiming the dogma of the Immaculate Conception, Pius XII asks all bishops to ascertain the opinion of their flock:

We earnestly beg you to inform us about the devotion of your clergy and people (taking into account their faith and piety) toward the Assumption of the most Blessed Virgin Mary. More especially We wish to know if you, Venerable Brethren, with your learning and prudence consider that the bodily Assumption of the Immaculate Blessed Virgin can be proposed and defined as a dogma of faith, and whether in addition to your own wishes this is desired by your clergy and people.

The bishops gave an almost unanimous affirmative response to both these questions.

== See also ==
- Mariology
- Marian papal encyclicals and Apostolic Letters
