= Aranjuez Immaculate Conception =

Painting by Bartolomé Esteban Murillo

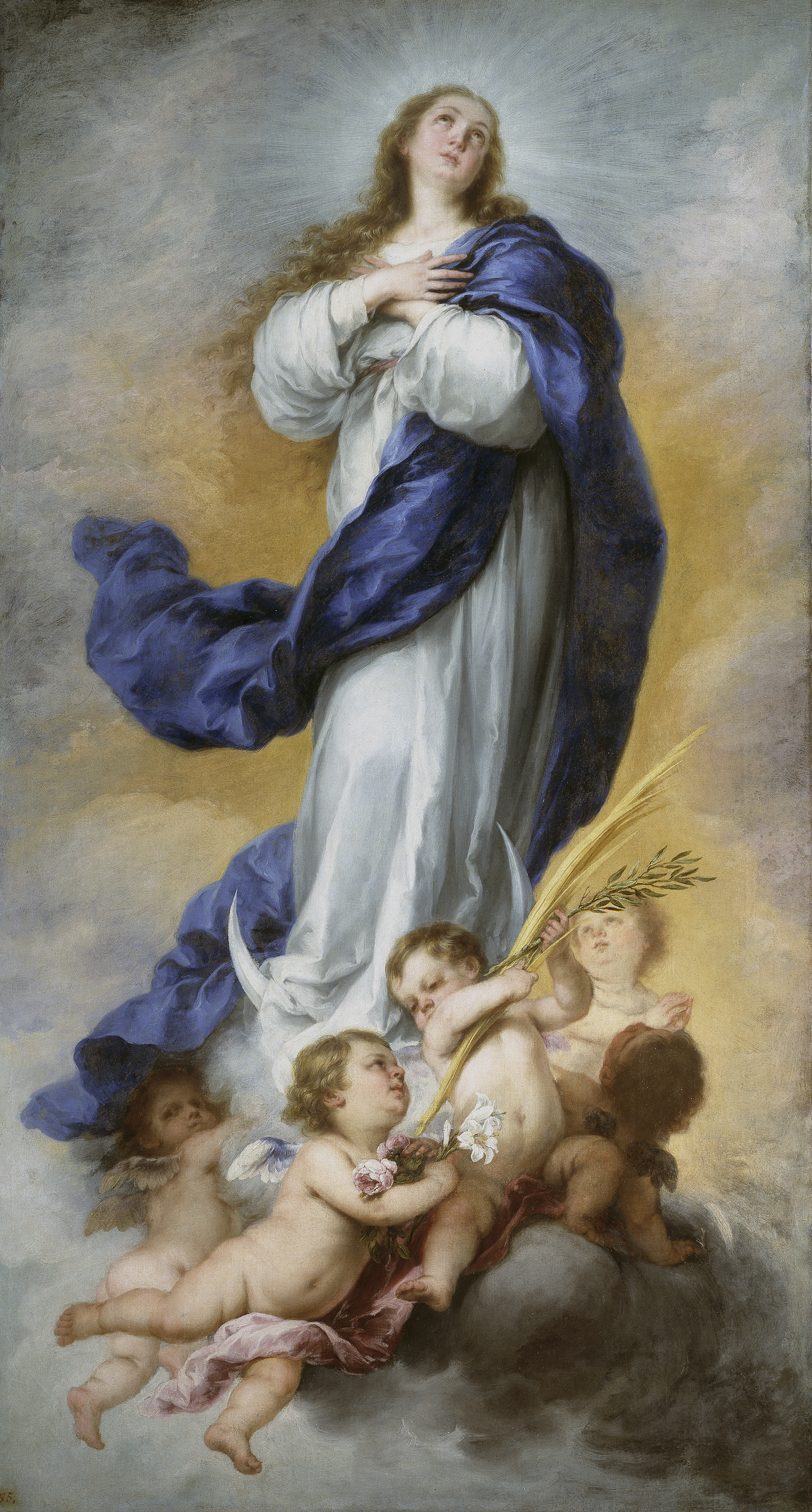
Aranjuez Immaculate Conception (c. 1675) by Bartolomé Esteban Murillo

The Aranjuez Immaculate Conception is a c.1675 oil on canvas painting by Bartolomé Esteban Murillo. It first appears in the written record in 1818, when it was in the royal chapel of San Antonio in the Palacio de Aranjuez in Madrid, after which it is named. It next appears in the queen's quarters in the same palace in 1827 and is now in the Prado Museum.
