= Antoine Wenger =

French priest

Antoine Wenger (September 2, 1919, in Rohrwiller – May 22, 2009, in Draguignan) was a French priest, Patristics scholar and journalist. After studies in Strasbourg and Paris he taught at the Institut Catholique (Catholic University) in Lyons. Ordained priest in 1943 as an Assumptionist, he pursued that order's interest in Byzantine studies and journalism.

After a work appropriately devoted to developments in the doctrine concerning the Assumption of the Virgin Mary, a discovery at Stavronikita monastery on Mount Athos enabled him to edit eight unpublished homilies of St. John Chrysostom in 1957. In the same year he was appointed editor of La Croix and helped to ensure that newspaper's profile as a prominent French daily. In this position he was assisted by a future editor of the journal, Noël Copin (1929–2007), who assisted him in his coverage of the Second Vatican Council.

Wenger also encouraged the journalist Jacques Duquesne in his coverage of the Algerian War of Independence.

On retirement he pursued dialogue with the Orthodox Churches and published a work on KGB archives relative to the Catholic Church.
