= Gloriosae Dominae =

Coat of Arms of Pope Benedict XIV

Gloriosae Dominae is an Apostolic Letter by Pope Benedict XIV issued on September 27, 1748.

In this Apostolic Letter Pope Benedict XIV called the Blessed Virgin Mary "Queen of heaven and earth," stated that the sovereign King has in some way communicated to her his ruling power. In it, Benedict also praised the Sodality of Our Lady. This apostolic letter is quoted in Pope Pius XII's 1954 encyclical Ad Caeli Reginam.

This document is often referred to as "the Golden Bull", since the seal was of gold rather than the usual lead.

== See also ==
- Roman Catholic Mariology
- Ad Caeli Reginam
