= Ineffabilis Deus =

1854 apostolic constitution issued by Pope Pius IX

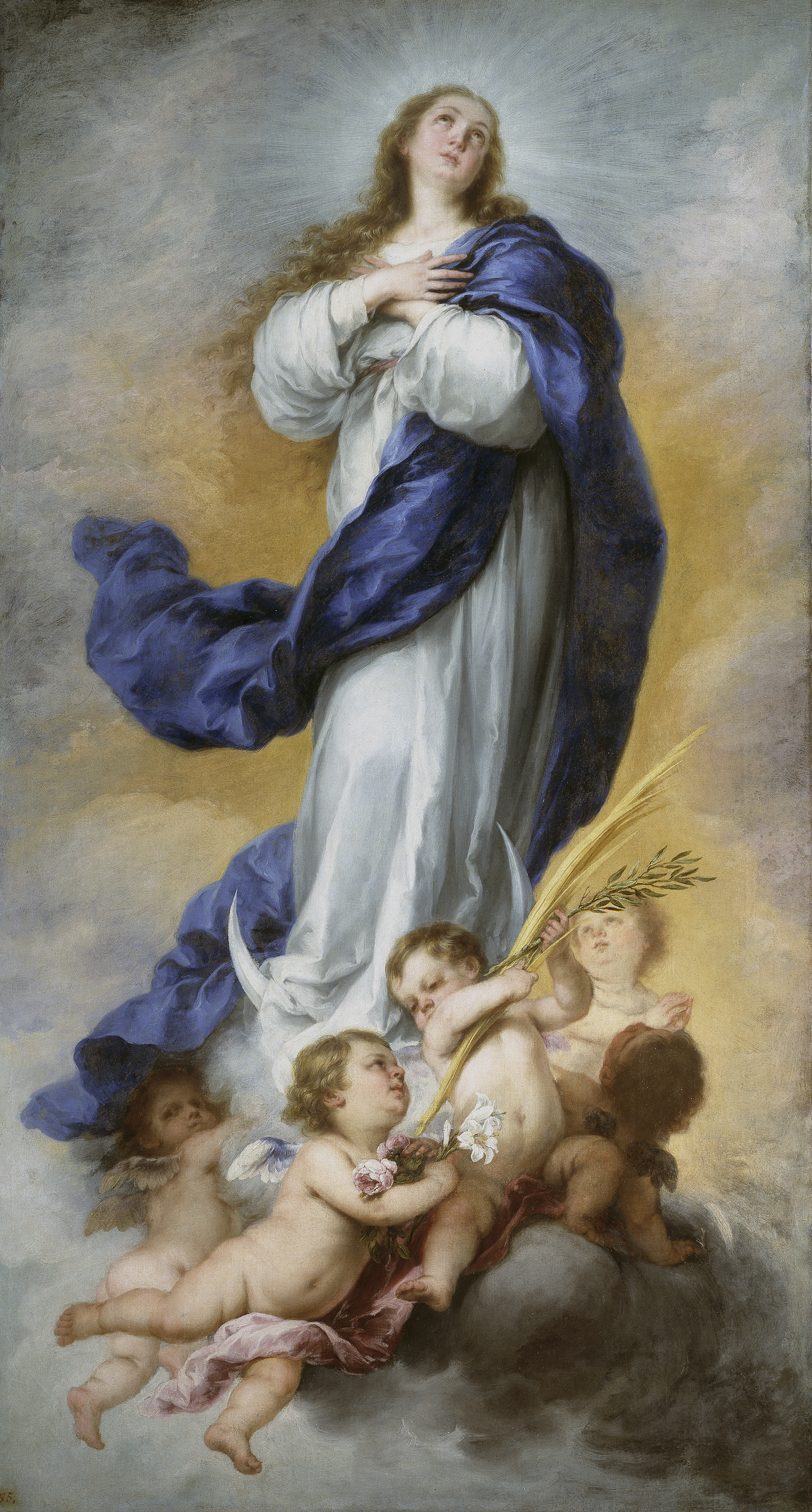
Aranjuez Immaculate Conception (c. 1675) by Murillo

Ineffabilis Deus (Latin for 'Ineffable God') is an apostolic constitution by Pope Pius IX. It defines the dogma of the Immaculate Conception of the Blessed Virgin Mary. The document was promulgated on December 8, 1854, the date of the annual Solemnity of the Immaculate Conception, and followed from a positive response to the encyclical Ubi primum.

Mary's immaculate conception is a pronouncement made ex cathedra and is therefore considered by the Catholic Church to be infallible through the extraordinary magisterium.

== Context ==
During the reign of his predecessor, Pope Gregory XVI, the bishops in various countries began to press for a definition as dogma of the teaching of Mary’s immaculate conception. Pius then appointed a commission to study the matter. In 1849, in the encyclical Ubi primum, noting that the bishops themselves seemed in favour of the definition, he solicited the bishops to find the opinions of their flocks.

== Content ==
Pius takes note that Early Church Fathers, such as Irenaeus, compared Eve and Mary.

Hence, to demonstrate the original innocence and sanctity of the Mother of God, not only did they frequently compare her to Eve while yet a virgin, while yet innocence, while yet incorrupt, while not yet deceived by the deadly snares of the most treacherous serpent; but they have also exalted her above Eve with a wonderful variety of expressions.

The decree surveys the history of the belief in Christian tradition, citing its roots in the long-standing feast of the Conception of Mary as a date of significance in the Eastern and Western churches. It also cites the approval of Catholic bishops worldwide who were asked in 1849 to offer their opinion on the matter.

The dogmatic statement is expressed near the end of the document:

We declare, pronounce, and define that the doctrine which holds that the most Blessed Virgin Mary, in the first instance of her conception, by a singular grace and privilege granted by Almighty God, in view of the merits of Jesus Christ, the Savior of the human race, was preserved free from all stain of original sin, is a doctrine revealed by God and therefore to be believed firmly and constantly by all the faithful.

"Mary's privilege ... was the result of God's grace and not of any intrinsic merit on her part", which is reflected in the decree. In this Pius followed the reasoning of John Duns Scotus. "The Perfect Redeemer, must in some case, have done the work of redemption most perfectly, which would not be, unless there is some person, at least, in whose regard, the wrath of God was anticipated and not merely appeased." The 1964 Dogmatic Constitution, Lumen gentium noted the view prevalent "...among the Fathers whereby they called the mother of God entirely holy and free from all stain of sin, as though fashioned by the Holy Spirit and formed as a new creature."

== See also ==
- Immaculate Conception
- Marian papal encyclicals and Apostolic Letters
- Papal infallibility
