= Ad Caeli Reginam =

1954 papal encyclical by Pope Pius XII, on the Queenship of Mary

Ad Caeli Reginam Latin for 'To the Queen of Heavens' Encyclical of Pope Pius XII
- Signature date: 11 October 1954
- Number: 30 of 41 of the pontificate
- Text: In Latin; In English

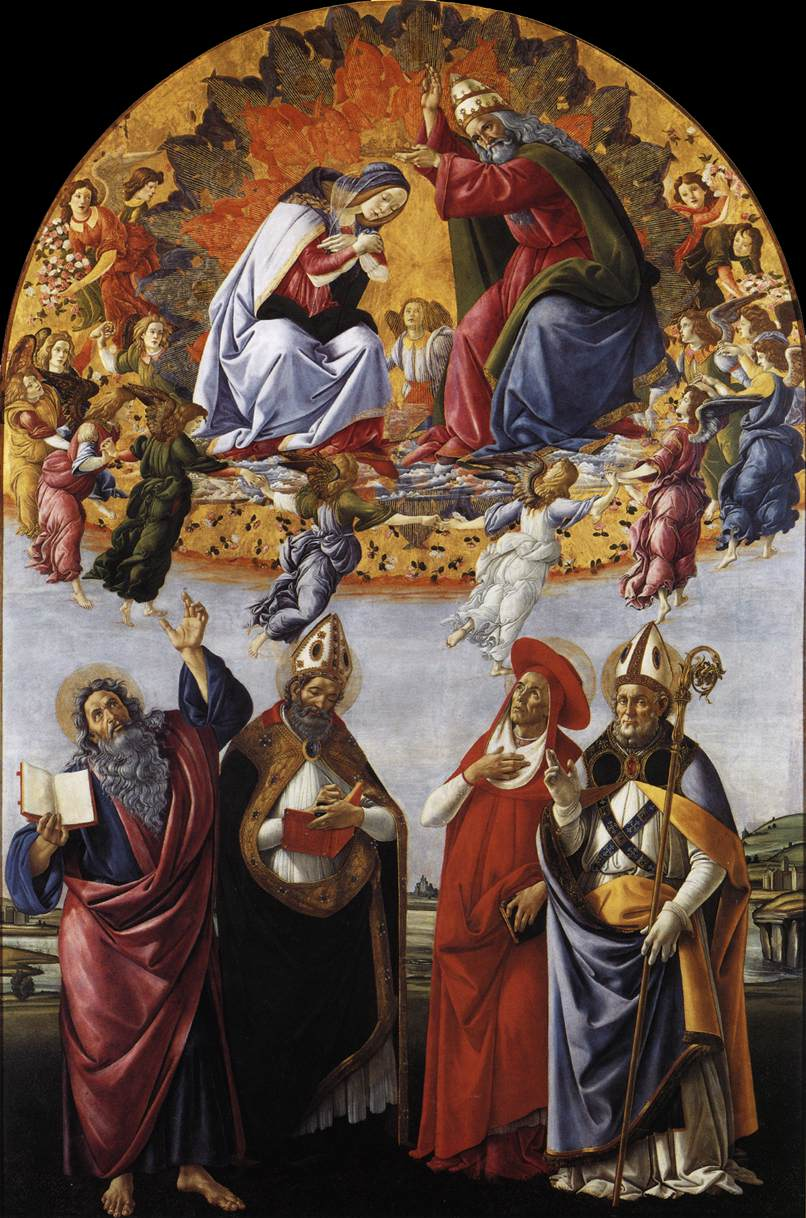
Botticelli, the coronation of the Virgin

Ad Caeli Reginam is an encyclical of Pope Pius XII, given at Rome, from St. Peter's Basilica, on the feast of the Maternity of the Blessed Virgin Mary, the eleventh day of October, 1954, towards the end of the Marian year, in the sixteenth year of his Pontificate. The encyclical is an important element of the Mariology of Pope Pius XII. It established the feast Queenship of Mary.

== History ==
The title "Queen of Heaven" is given to Mary-based primarily on her role as Theotokos (translated as Mother of God), as proclaimed by the Council of Ephesus in 431. As Christ is King, so his mother is accorded the title of Queen.

From the earliest ages of the Catholic Church a Christian people, whether in time of triumph or more especially in time of crisis, has addressed prayers of petition and hymns of praise and veneration to the Queen of Heaven. And never has that hope wavered which they placed in the Mother of the Divine King, Jesus Christ; nor has that faith ever failed by which we are taught that Mary, the Virgin Mother of God, reigns with a mother's solicitude over the entire world, just as she is crowned in heavenly blessedness with the glory of a Queen.

Pope Sixtus IV, in his apostolic letter Cum Praeexcelsa of 1476, establishing a Mass and Office for the Feast of the Immaculate Conception, referred to Mary as a "Queen,"... "Who is always vigilant to intercede with the king whom she bore." Pope Leo XIII refers to Mary as "Queen of Heaven" in the 1891 encyclical Octobri Mense. This title of Mary became generally accepted so that with the encyclical Ad Caeli Reginam, of October 11, 1954, Pope Pius XII instituted the feast of the Queenship of Mary.

== Basic teachings ==
"Mary deserves the title because she is Mother of God, because she is closely associated as the New Eve with Jesus’ redemptive work, because of her preeminent perfection, and because of her intercessory power."

== Content ==
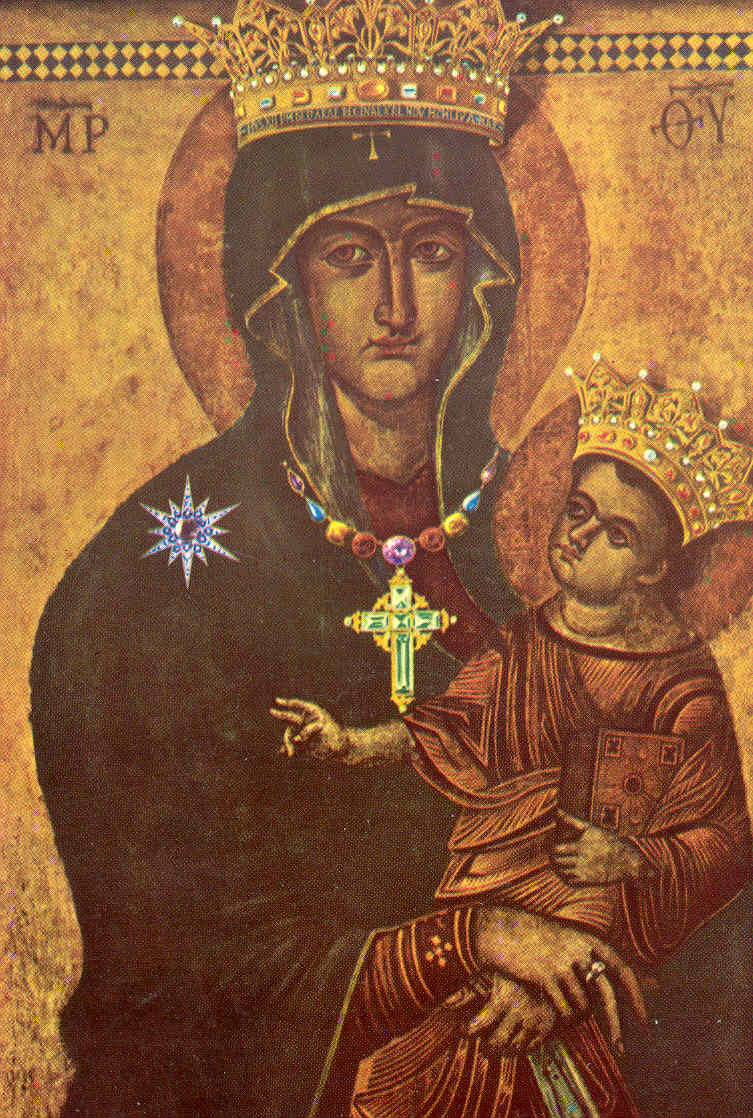
A rare picture of Salus Populi Romani crowned for the Marian year 1954 by Pope Pius XII

The church has always taught that Mary is far above all other creatures in dignity, and after her Son possesses primacy over all. Pius begins by recalling the teachings of the Fathers, Doctors and Popes on Mary's royal dignity. Germanus of Constantinople says: "Your honor and dignity surpass the whole of creation; your greatness places you above the angels."

"...[I]t is easily concluded that she is a Queen, since she bore a son who, at the very moment of His conception, because of the hypostatic union of the human nature with the Word, was also as man King and Lord of all things.

Pius XII quotes his predecessors: Pope Pius IX, "With a heart that is truly a mother's," does she approach the problem of our salvation, and is solicitous for the whole human race; made Queen of heaven and earth by the Lord, exalted above all choirs of angels and saints, and standing at the right hand of her only Son, Jesus Christ our Lord, she intercedes powerfully for us with a mother's prayers, obtains what she seeks, and cannot be refused." Leo XIII, said that an "almost immeasurable" power has been given Mary in the distribution of graces; Pius X adds that she fills this office "as by the right of a mother."

He also points to a long tradition of liturgical practice. The title is found in the Liturgy of the Hours(Hail, Holy Queen...) and popular piety (Litany of Loreto). The title of "Queen" is frequently found in Benedictine monasticism. Its use underwent a notable development in the Cistercian reform movement and in the orders of evangelical apostolic life that arose from the beginning of the twelfth century onwards.

Pius XII admonishes theologians and preachers from straying from the correct course, avoiding two extremes, Marian exaggerations and excessive narrowness of mind. "It is certain that only Jesus Christ God and Man is King, but Mary as Mother of King and associated to Him in work of divine redemption participates in His royal dignity."

The encyclical points to some countries of the world, where people are unjustly persecuted for their Christian faith and who are deprived of their divine and human rights to freedom. Reasonable demands and repeated protests have not helped them. “May the powerful Queen of creation, whose radiant glance banishes storms and tempests and brings back cloudless skies, look upon these her innocent and tormented children with eyes of mercy”.

The encyclical established the feast of the Queenship of Mary which was initially celebrated on May 31 but subsequently transferred to August 22, seven days after the Solemnity of the Assumption.

== Quotes ==
Certainly, in the full and strict meaning of the term, only Jesus Christ, the God-Man, is King; but Mary, too, as Mother of the divine Christ, as His associate in the redemption, in his struggle with His enemies and His final victory over them, has a share, though in a limited and analogous way, in His royal dignity. For from her union with Christ she attains a radiant eminence transcending that of any other creature; from her union with Christ she receives the royal right to dispose of the treasures of the Divine Redeemer's Kingdom; from her union with Christ finally is derived the inexhaustible efficacy of her maternal intercession before the Son and His Father.

== See also ==
- Marian papal encyclicals and Apostolic Letters

== Sources ==
- Pope Pius XII, Mariological encyclicals and bulls:
  - Fulgens Corona
  - Deiparae Virginis Mariae
  - Ingruentium Malorum
  - Le Pelerinage de Lourdes
  - Mystici Corporis Christi
  - Apostolic Constitution Munificentissimus Deus
- Acta Apostolicae Sedis. (AAS), Vatican City 1939-1958. Official documents of the Pontificate of Pope Pius XII
