= Assumption of Mary =

Dogma of Mary's bodily entry into Heaven

The Assumption of the Blessed Virgin Mary
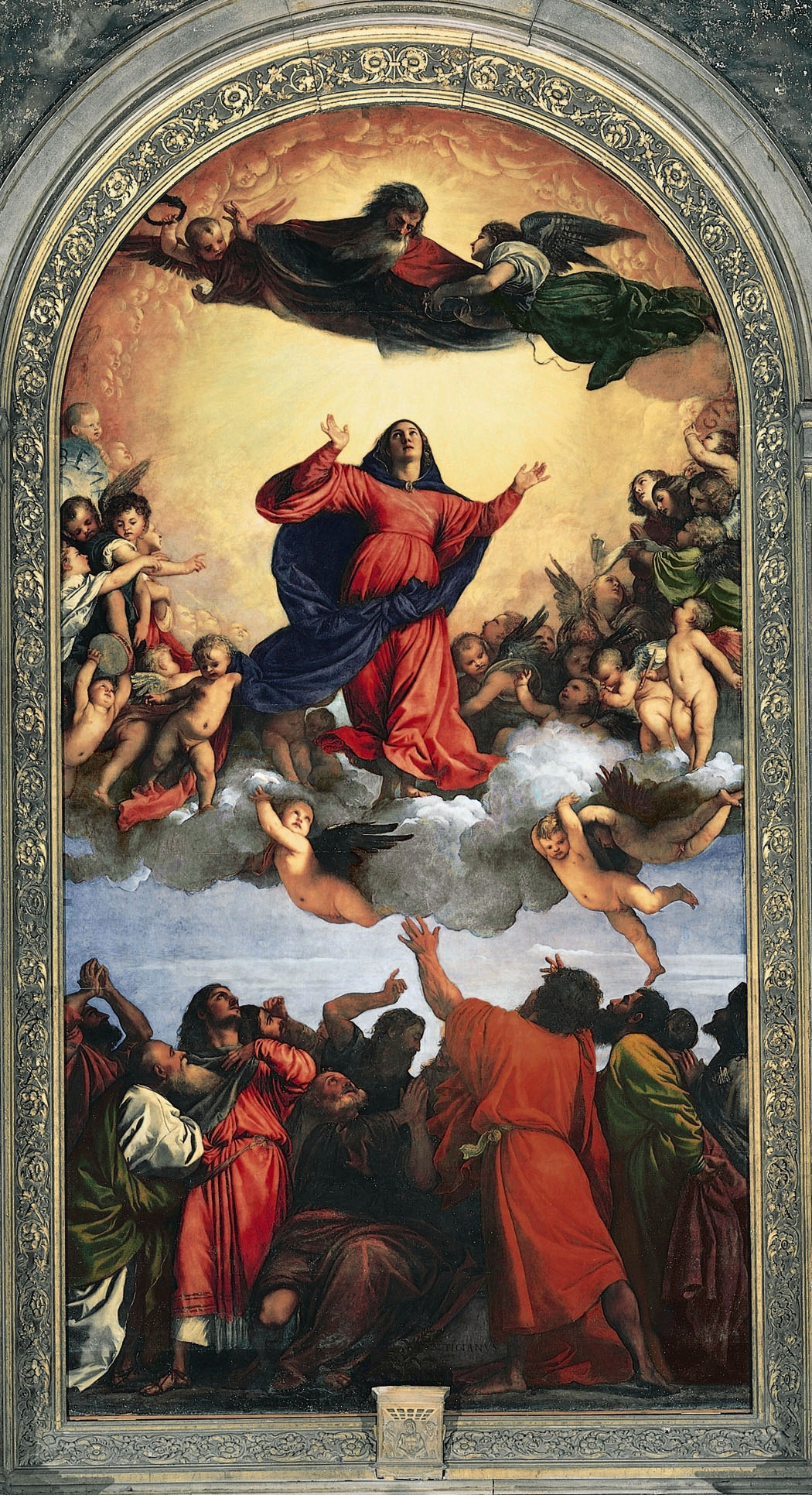
- A famous treatment in Western art, Titian's Assumption, 1516–1518
- Also called: The Assumption; Falling Asleep of the Blessed Virgin Mary
- Observed by: Catholic Church (see calendar); Eastern Orthodox Church (see calendar); Oriental Orthodox Churches; Church of the East; Lutheran Churches (see calendar); Various Anglican Churches (see calendars)
- Type: Christian
- Significance: The bodily taking up of Mary, the mother of Jesus, into Heaven
- Observances: Blessing of herbs, processions
- Date: 15 August; Sunday nearest to 15 August (Armenian Apostolic Church); 22 August (Coptic Orthodox Church, Ethiopian Orthodox Tewahedo Church, Eritrean Orthodox Tewahedo Church)
- Frequency: Annual

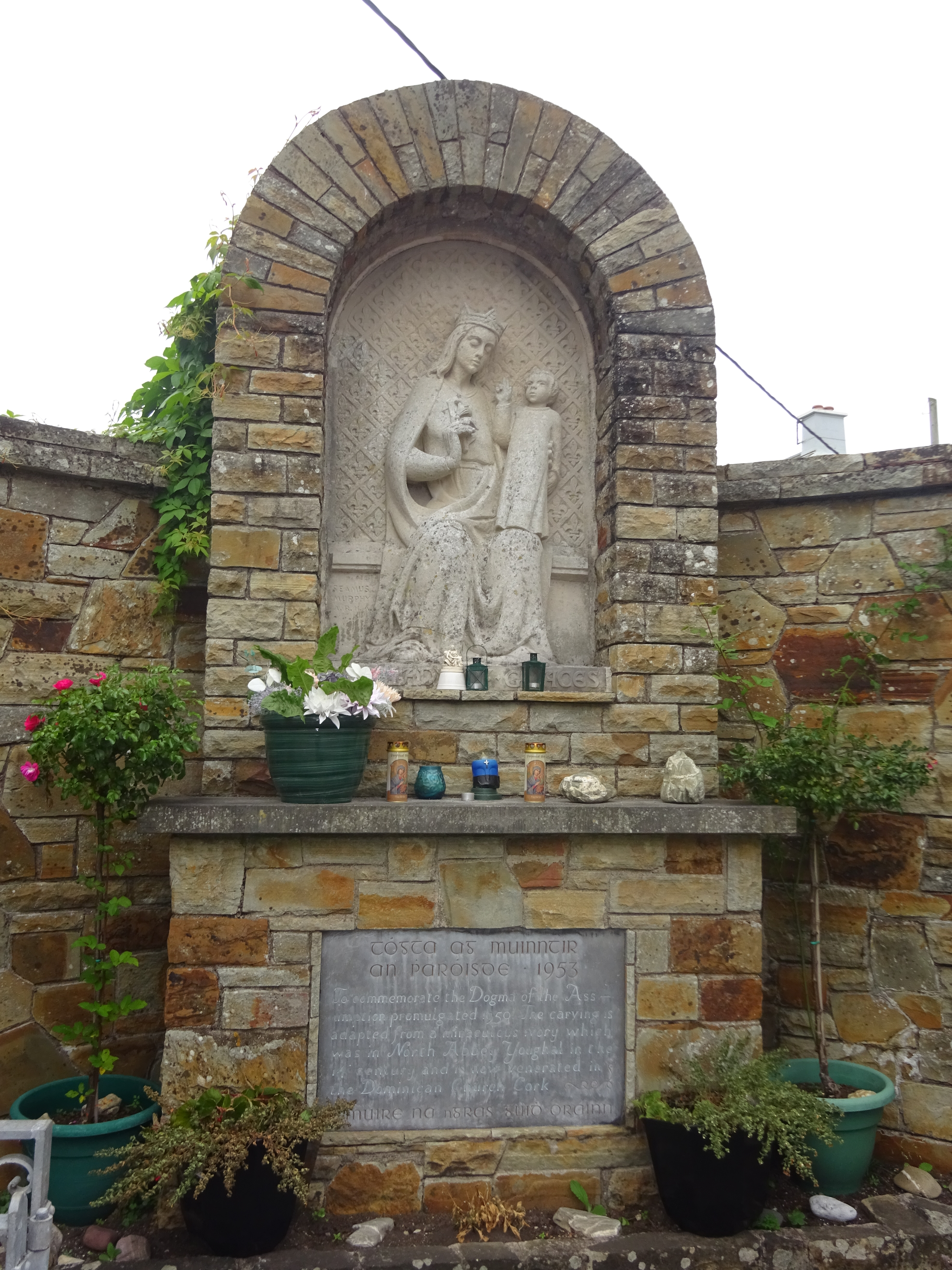
Memorial in Youghal, Ireland, to the promulgation of the dogma of the Assumption

The Assumption of Mary is a Catholic dogma that Mary, at the end of her earthly life, was taken body and soul into heaven, defined by Pope Pius XII on 1 November 1950 in his apostolic constitution Munificentissimus Deus. It is celebrated on 15 August.

It leaves open the question of whether Mary died or whether she was raised to eternal life without bodily death.

The equivalent belief in the Eastern Christianity is the Dormition of the Mother of God or the "Falling Asleep of the Mother of God". In the Lutheran churches, 15 August is celebrated as the Feast of St. Mary. A number of Anglican denominations observe 15 August under various titles, including the Feast of Saint Mary the Virgin or the Falling Asleep of the Blessed Virgin Mary.

The word 'assumption' derives from the Latin word assūmptiō, meaning 'taking up'.

== History ==
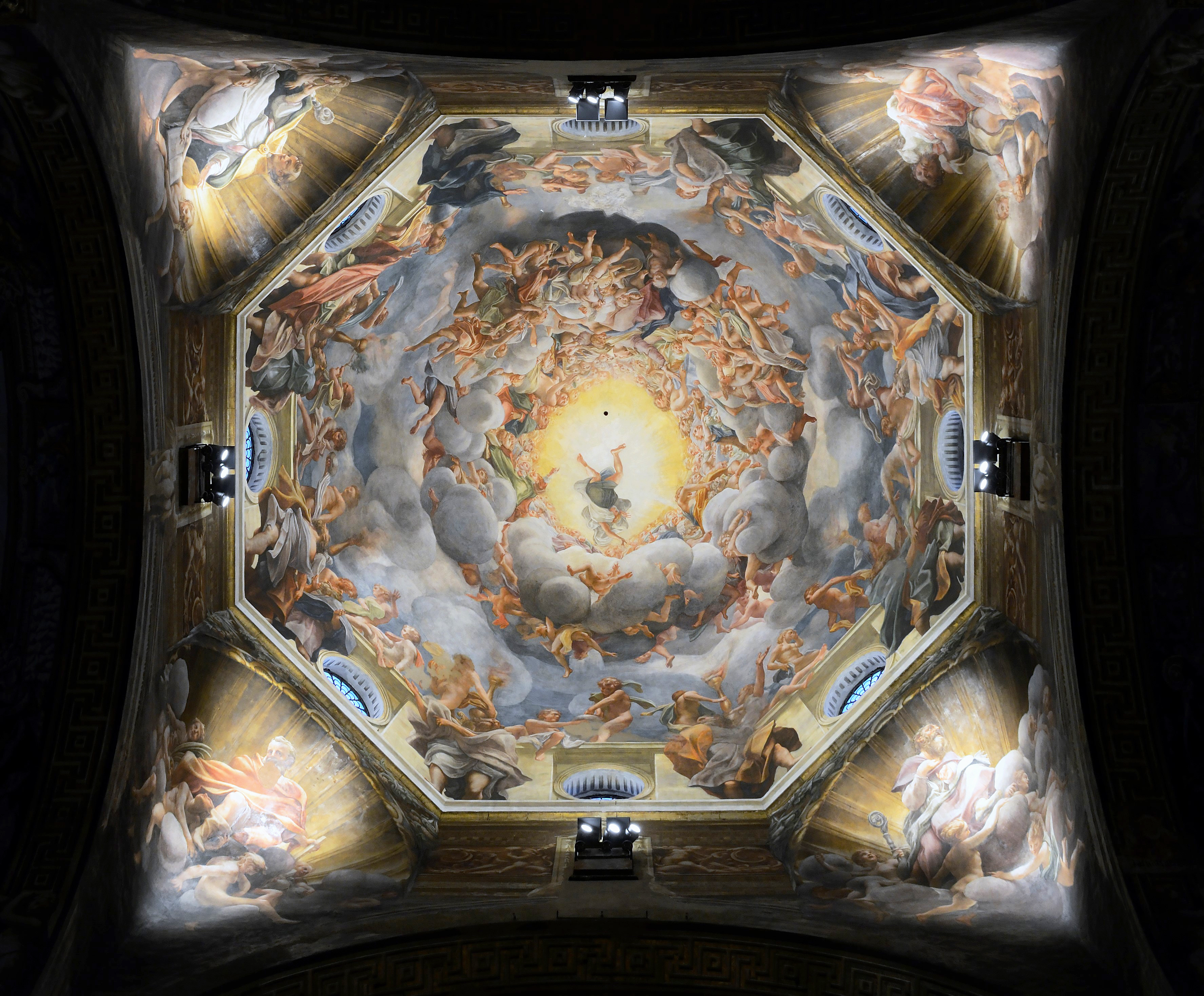
Parma Cathedral, Illusionistic dome, Correggio, 1526–1530

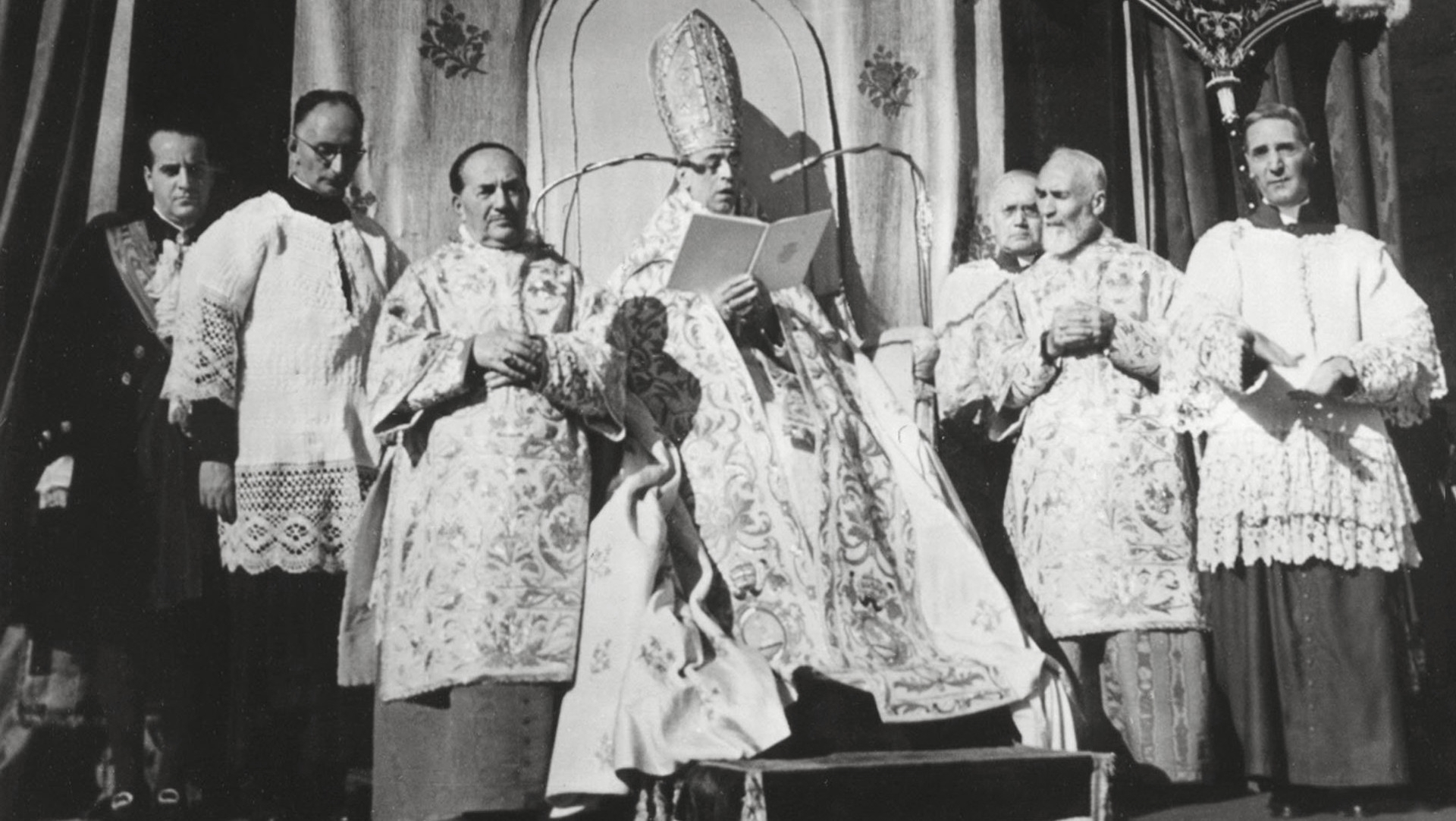
Pope Pius XII in 1950 proclaiming the dogma of the Assumption of Mary

Some scholars argue that the Dormition and Assumption traditions can be traced early in church history in the apocryphal books, with Stephen J. Shoemaker noting about the dating:

For instance, Baldi, Masconi, and Cothenet analyzed the corpus of Dormition narratives using a rather different approach, governed primarily by language tradition rather than literary relations, and yet all agree that the Obsequies (i.e., the Liber Requiei Mariae) and the Six Books Dormition Apocryphon reflect the earliest traditions, locating their origins in the second or third century. Richard Bauckham too, through study... dates the Six Books to the fourth century....Numerous others, including Maximilian Bonnet, Jean Rivière, and Jean Gribomont, have concluded that these narratives originate in the fourth century, if not earlier.

According to Shoemaker, the first known narrative to address the end of Mary's life and her assumption is the apocryphal third- and possibly second-century Liber Requiei Mariae ("The Book of Mary's Repose"). Yet numerous features indicate that the Liber Requiei Mariae, or the Obsequies of the Virgin, as the text is called in Syriac, has manuscripts which date according to Shoemaker to the "fifth or sixth centuries" where the "original Greek underlying these early translations almost certainly belongs to the fourth century."

Another early source that speaks of the assumption are the Six Books Dormition Apocryphon. It dates almost certainly to the middle of the fourth century, if not perhaps even earlier. Most significantly, the Six Books Dormition Apocryphon provides compelling evidence for an early cult of the Virgin nearly a century before the events of the Council of Ephesus. Shoemaker, expressing his own opinion on the subject, states: "the diversity of their accounts already by the end of the fifth century ensures the apocryphon’s composition by the early fifth century at the very latest, and a number of features locate the Six Books much more probably in the fourth century" with the "Six Books apocryphon present[ing] a rather different sensibility about the veneration of Mary from the Liber Requiei".

The Greek Discourse on the Dormition or The Book of John Concerning the Falling Asleep of Mary (attributed to John the Theologian), is another anonymous narrative, and may even precede the Book of Mary's Repose. This Greek document, is dated by Tischendorf as no later than the 4th century, but is dated by Shoemaker as later.

The New Testament is silent regarding the end of her life. In the late 4th century Epiphanius of Salamis wrote he could find no authorized tradition about how her life ended. Nevertheless, although Epiphanius could not decide on the basis of biblical or church tradition whether Mary had died or remained immortal, his indecisive reflections suggest that some difference of opinion on the matter had already arisen in his time, and he identified three beliefs concerning her end: that she had a normal and peaceful death; that she died as a martyr; or that she did not die. Even more, in another text Epiphanius stated that Mary was like Elijah because she never died but was assumed, like him.

Other works that mention the assumption of Mary are the apocryphal treatise De Obitu S. Dominae, bearing the name of St. John, which belongs however to the fourth or fifth century. It is also found in the apocryphal book De Transitus Beatae Mariae Virginis, falsely ascribed to Melito of Sardis, and in a spurious letter attributed to Denis the Areopagite.

Teaching of the assumption of Mary became widespread across the Christian world, having been celebrated as early as the 5th century and having been established in the East by Emperor Maurice around 600 AD. In a homily, John Damascene (675–749 AD), citing the third book of the Euthymiac History, records the following:

St. Juvenal, Bishop of Jerusalem, at the Council of Chalcedon (451), made known to the Emperor Marcian and Pulcheria, who wished to possess the body of the Mother of God, that Mary died in the presence of all the Apostles, but that her tomb, when opened upon the request of St. Thomas, was found empty; wherefrom the Apostles concluded that the body was taken up to heaven.

There is a large number of accounts of the assumption of the Virgin Mary, published in various languages (including Greek, Latin, Coptic, Syriac, Ethiopic, Arabic). The standard Greek text is the one attributed to St John the Theologian (Evangelist). The standard Latin is that attributed to Melito of Sardis. Shoemaker mentions that "the ancient narratives are neither clear nor unanimous in either supporting or contradicting the dogma" of the assumption.

According to the Passing of the Blessed Virgin Mary, attributed to Joseph of Arimathea, which is a later version of the Virgin Mary's Dormition, probably from sometime after the early seventh century, one of the apostles, often identified as Thomas the Apostle, was not present at the death of Mary but his late arrival precipitates a reopening of Mary's tomb, which is found to be empty except for her grave clothes. Subsequently, Mary drops her girdle down to the apostle from heaven as testament to the event. This incident is depicted in many later paintings of the assumption.

The feast of the Dormition, arrived in the West in the early 7th century, its name changing to Assumption in some 9th century liturgical calendars. The feast was decreed for Constantinople on 15 August by the emperor Maurice in 600; about fifty years later it was introduced in Rome and is mentioned in a papal decree of Sergius (687–701), who fixed a procession for the feast. Pope Leo IV (reigned 847–855) gave the feast a vigil and an octave to solemnise it above all others, Pope Nicholas I (858–867) placed it on a par with Christmas and Easter, and Pope Benedict XIV (1740–1758) declared it "a probable opinion, which to deny were impious and blasphemous".

Between 1849 and 1950, numerous petitions for the assumption to be declared as dogma arrived in Rome. On 1 May 1946 the Pope sent to the bishops of the world the encyclical Deiparae Virginis Mariae, putting this questions to them: "Do you, venerable brethren, in your outstanding wisdom and prudence, judge that the bodily Assumption of the Blessed Virgin can be proposed and defined as a dogma of faith? Do you, with your clergy and people, desire it?" The bishops gave an almost unanimous affirmative response to both these questions.

Finally, on 1 November 1950, Pope Pius XII declared the Assumption of the Virgin Mary as a dogma of faith with the apostolic constitution Munificentissimus Deus as follows:

We pronounce, declare, and define it to be a divinely revealed dogma: that the Immaculate Mother of God, the ever Virgin Mary, having completed the course of her earthly life, was assumed body and soul into heavenly glory.

Pope Pius XII expressed in his apostolic constitution the hope that the belief in the bodily assumption of the virgin Mary into heaven "will make our belief in our own resurrection stronger and render it more effective", while the Catechism of the Catholic Church adds: "The Assumption of the Blessed Virgin is a singular participation in her Son's Resurrection and an anticipation of the resurrection of other Christians."

At the time of the 1950 papal announcement, psychologist Carl Jung considered it "the most important religious event since the Reformation."

=== Related traditions ===
In some versions of the assumption narrative, the assumption is said to have taken place in Ephesus, in the House of the Virgin Mary. This is a much more recent and localised tradition. The earliest traditions say that Mary's life ended in Jerusalem (see Tomb of the Virgin Mary).

Scholars of the Studium Biblicum Franciscanum "argued that during or shortly after the apostolic age a group of Jewish Christians in Jerusalem preserved an oral tradition about the end of the Virgin's life". Thus, by pointing to oral tradition, they argued for the historicity of the assumption and Dormition narratives. According to Antoine Wenger "the strikingly diverse traditions of Mary's Dormition and Assumption arise from 'a great variety of original types', rather than being the result of a progressive modification of a single, original tradition". Simon Claude Mimouni and his predecessors have argued that belief in the Virgin's Assumption is the final dogmatic development, rather than the point of origin, of these traditions.

In the German-speaking and some Slavic countries (like Poland), the custom of blessing (aromatic) herbs is associated with the Solemnity of the Assumption of the Blessed Virgin Mary. This ancient custom "came to be associated with the Blessed Virgin Mary, in part because of the biblical images applied to her such as vine, lavender, cypress and lily, partly from seeing her in terms of a sweet smelling flower because of her virtue", and Isaiah's reference to the shoot springing from the side of Jesse, which brought Jesus Christ as a fruit. The custom is also related to the tradition of the Frauendreißiger (means approx. "thirty days of Our Lady"), a period lasting to 8 September, the Feast of the Nativity of Mary. This rural tradition goes back to the fact that the herbs contain particularly high levels of essential oils at this time of year and are especially healthy.

=== Scriptural basis ===
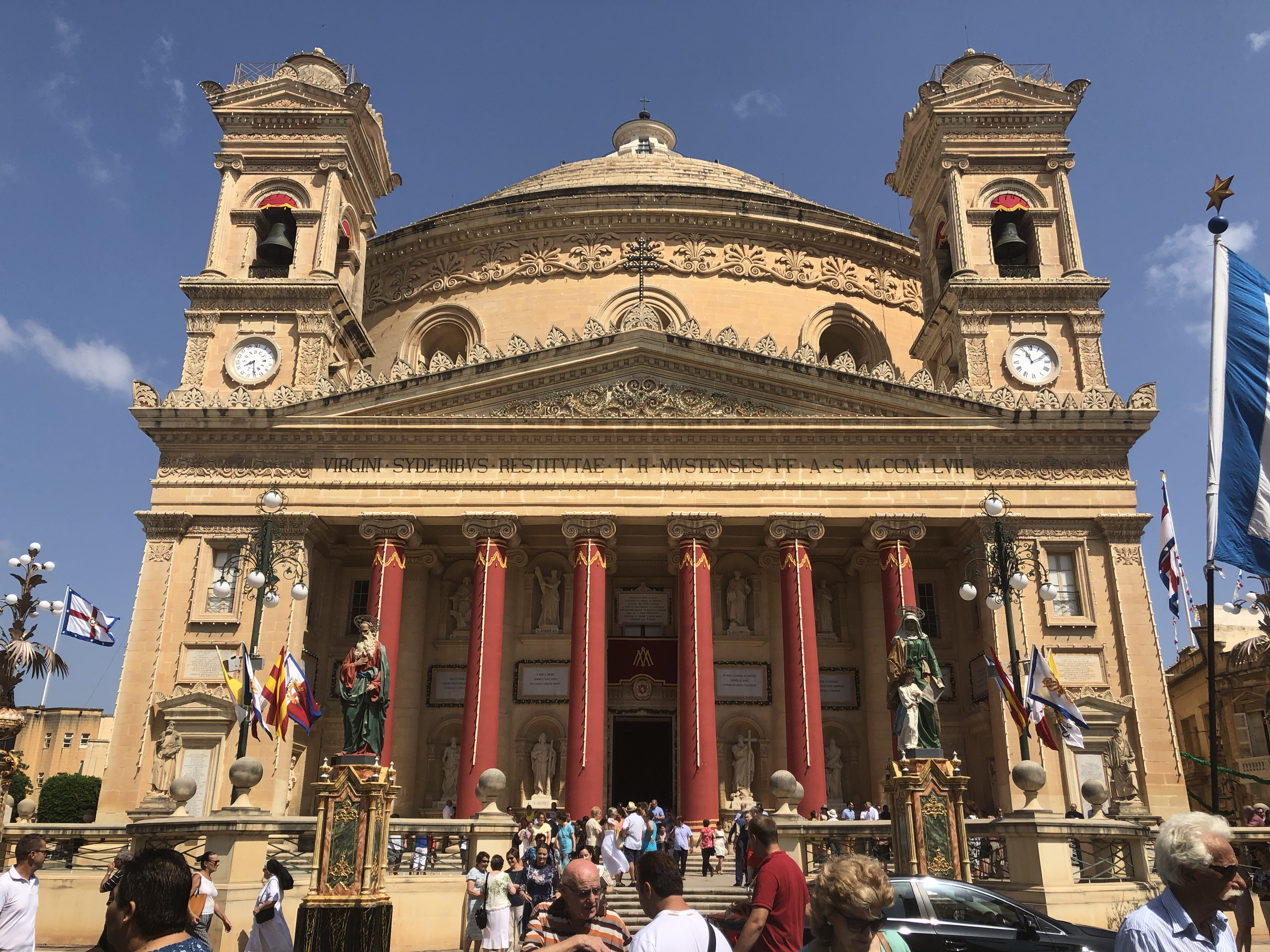
Basilica of the Assumption of Our Lady in Mosta, Malta. The façade is decorated for the Feast of the Assumption.

The apostolic constitution Munificentissimus Deus mentions several Holy Fathers, theologians and Doctors of the Church who held the assumption of Mary, among them are Adrian I, Sergius I, Leo IV, John of Damascus, Amadeus of Lausanne, Modestus of Jerusalem, Anthony of Padua, Albertus Magnus, Thomas of Aquinas (Angelic Doctor), Bonaventure (Seraphic Doctor), Bernardino of Siena, Robert Bellarmine, Francis de Sales, Peter Canisius, Francisco Suárez, among others. The apostolic constitution adds: "All these proofs and considerations of the holy Fathers and the theologians are based upon the Sacred Writings as their ultimate foundation."

Father Jugie, expressed the view that Revelation 12:1–2 was the chief scriptural witness to the assumption:

And a great sign appeared in heaven: a woman clothed with the sun, and the moon under her feet, and on her head a crown of twelve stars; and she was with child ...

— Revelation 12:1–2

This passage, Epiphanius proposes, may indicate that Mary did not die as other human beings, but somehow remained immortal, although he makes clear his own uncertainty and refrains from advocating this view. Ultimately Epiphanius concludes: "[I] am not saying that she remained immortal. But neither am I affirming that she died."

Since the time of the early Church Fathers, this image of "the woman clothed with the sun" has had a threefold symbolism: the ancient people of Israel, the Church and Mary.

Many of the bishops cited Genesis 3:15, in which God is addressing the serpent in the Garden of Eden, as the primary confirmation of Mary's assumption:

I will put enmity between you and the woman, and between your offspring and hers; he will strike your head, and you will strike his heel.

— Genesis 3:15

Many scholars connect Jesus' usage of the word "woman" to call Mary instead of calling her "mother" as a confirmation of Mary being the "woman" described in Genesis 3:15. Mary was often seen as the "New Eve", who crushed the serpent's head at the Annunciation by obeying the angel Gabriel when he said she would bear the Messiah (Luke 1:38).

The Catechism of the Catholic Church affirms that the account of the fall in Genesis 3 uses figurative language, and that the fall of mankind, by the seductive voice of the snake in the Bible, represents the fallen angel, Satan or "the devil". Similarly, the great dragon in Revelation 12 is a representation of Satan, identified with the serpent from the garden who has enmity with the woman. Therefore, in Catholic thought, there is an association between this woman and Mary's Assumption.

Among the many other passages noted by Pope Pius XII were the following:

- Psalm 132 (Psalm 132:8), greeting the return of the Ark of the Covenant to Jerusalem ("Arise, O Lord, into your resting place, you and the ark which you have sanctified!"), where the ark is taken as the prophetic "type" of Mary;
- Revelation 11:19, in which John sees the Ark of the Covenant in heaven (this verse immediately precedes the vision of the woman clothed with the sun);
- Luke 1:28, in which the Archangel Gabriel greets Mary with the words, "Hail Mary, full of grace", since Mary's bodily assumption is a natural consequence of being full of grace;
- 1 Corinthians 15 (1 Corinthians 15:23) and Matthew 27 (Matthew 27:52–53), concerning the certainty of bodily resurrection for all who have faith in Jesus.

The Bible mentions two prominent figures, Enoch and Elijah, who were taken up to heaven, serving as important precedents for the assumption of Mary. Enoch, referenced in the Book of Genesis, is noted for his intimate walk with God and is described as having been "taken" by God (Genesis 5:24), an event that is also reported in the Epistle to the Hebrews (Hebrews 11:5). Similarly, Elijah, the great prophet, was taken up to heaven in a whirlwind, accompanied by a chariot of fire, as recorded in 2 Kings (2 Kings 2:11).

=== Catholic Marian visionaries and the assumption ===
In the 12th century, the German nun Elisabeth of Schönau was reportedly granted visions of Mary and her son which had a profound influence on the Western Church's tradition. In her work Visio de resurrectione Beatae Virginis Mariae, she relates how Mary was assumed in body and soul into Heaven.

On 1 May 1950, Gilles Bouhours, a Marian seer, reported to Pius XII a presumed message that the Virgin Mary would have ordered him to communicate to the pope on the dogma of the Assumption of the Holy Virgin Mary. It is said that Pius XII asked God, during the Holy Year of 1950, for a sign that could reassure him that the dogma of the Assumption of the Virgin Mary was actually wanted by God and when Gilles communicated the message to Pius XII, the pope considered this message the hoped-for sign. Six months after the private audience granted to Gilles by the pope, Pius XII himself proclaimed the dogma of the Assumption of body and soul of the Blessed Virgin Mary into Heaven.

== Assumption versus Dormition ==
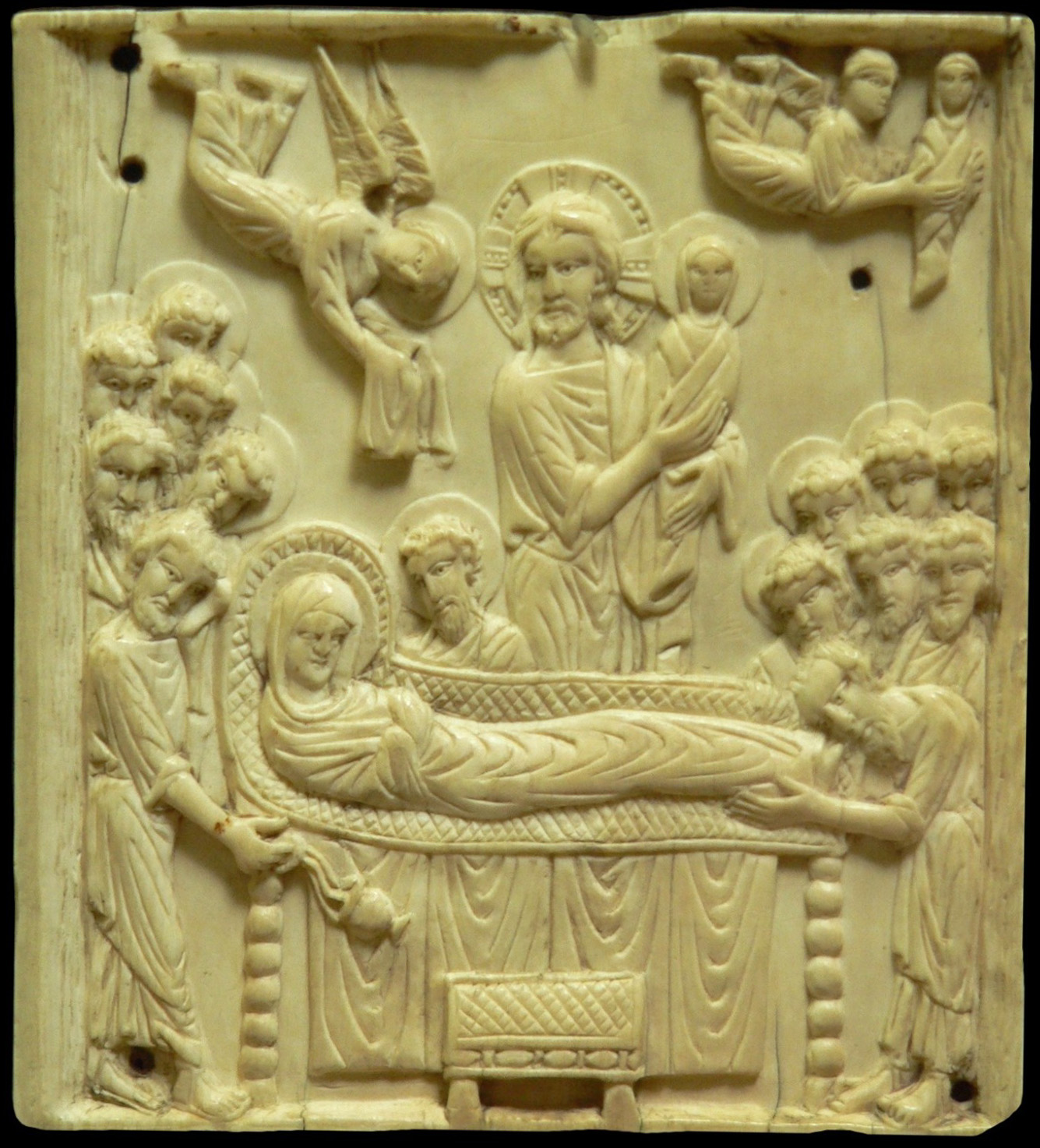
The Dormition: ivory plaque, late 10th–early 11th century (Musée de Cluny)

Some Catholics believe that Mary died before being assumed, but they believe that she was miraculously resurrected before being assumed (mortalistic interpretation). Others believe she was assumed bodily into Heaven without first dying (immortalistic interpretation). Either understanding may be legitimately held by Catholics, with Eastern Catholics observing the Feast as the Dormition. It seems, however, that there is much more evidence for the mortalistic position in the Catholic traditions (liturgy, apocrypha, material culture). Pope John Paul II expressed the mortalistic position in his public speech.

Many theologians note by way of comparison that in the Catholic Church the assumption is dogmatically defined, whilst in the Eastern Orthodox tradition the Dormition is less dogmatically than liturgically and mystically defined. Such differences spring from a larger pattern in the two traditions, wherein Catholic teachings are often dogmatically and authoritatively defined – in part because of the more centralized structure of the Catholic Church – whilst in Eastern Orthodoxy many doctrines are less authoritative.

The Feast of the Assumption of the Blessed Virgin Mary is celebrated in the Roman Catholic Church on 15 August, and the Eastern Orthodox and Eastern Catholics celebrate the Dormition of the Mother of God (or Dormition of the Theotokos, the "falling asleep of the Mother of God") on the same date, preceded by a 14-day fasting period. Eastern Christians believe that Mary died a natural death, that her soul was received by Christ upon death, that her body was resurrected after her death and that she was taken up into heaven bodily in anticipation of the general resurrection.

Orthodox tradition is clear and unwavering in regard to the central point [of the Dormition]: the Holy Virgin underwent, as did her Son, a physical death, but her body – like His – was afterwards raised from the dead and she was taken up into heaven, in her body as well as in her soul. She has passed beyond death and judgement and lives wholly in the Age to Come. The Resurrection of the Body ... has in her case been anticipated and is already an accomplished fact. That does not mean, however, that she is dissociated from the rest of humanity and placed in a wholly different category: for we all hope to share one day in that same glory of the Resurrection of the Body that she enjoys even now.

== Protestant views ==
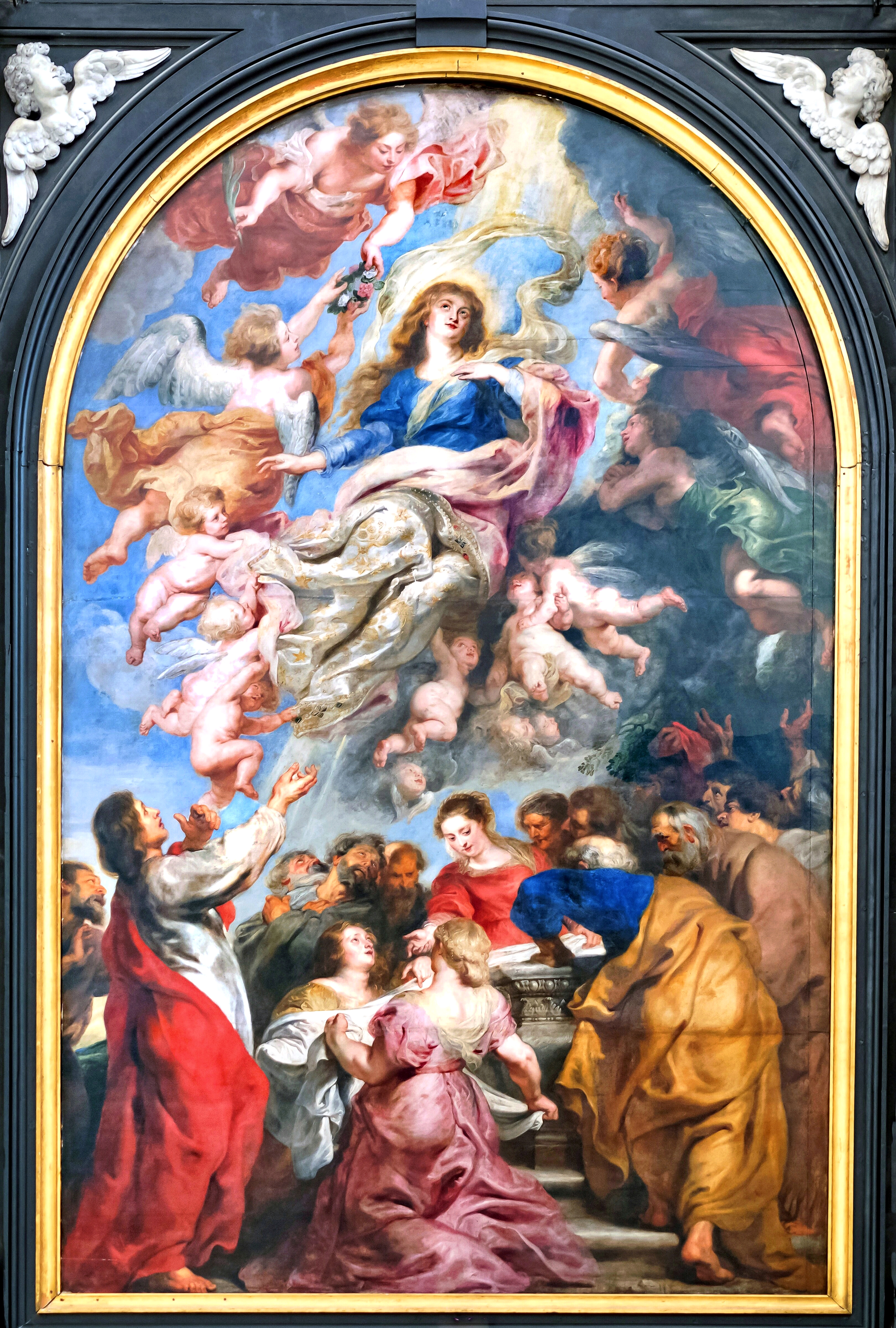
The Assumption of Mary, Rubens, 1626

Views differ within Protestantism, with those with a theology closer to Catholicism sometimes believing in a bodily assumption whilst most Protestants do not.

=== Lutheran views ===
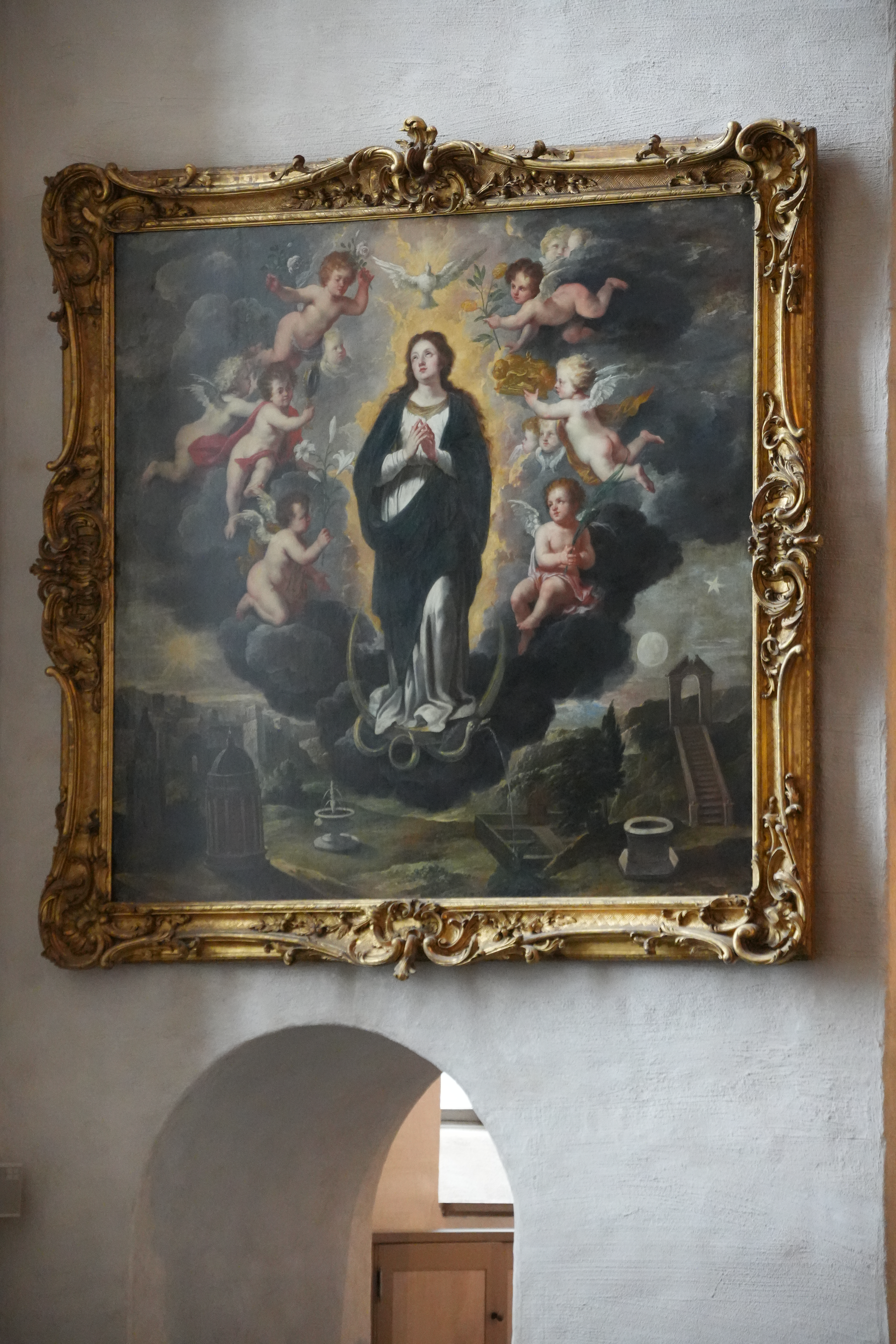
A painting of the Assumption of Blessed Virgin Mary at Högalid Evangelical-Lutheran Church in Stockholm

The Feast of the Assumption of Mary was retained by the Lutheran Church after the Reformation. Evangelical Lutheran Worship designates 15 August as a lesser festival named "Mary, Mother of Our Lord" while the current Lutheran Service Book formally calls it "St. Mary, Mother of our Lord".

=== Anglican views ===
Within Anglicanism the Assumption of Mary is accepted by some, rejected by others, or regarded as adiaphora ("a thing indifferent"). The doctrine effectively disappeared from Anglican worship in 1549, partially returning in Anglo-Catholic tradition during the 20th century under different names. A Marian feast on 15 August is celebrated by the Church of England as a non-specific feast of the Blessed Virgin Mary, a feast called by the Scottish Episcopal Church simply "Mary the Virgin", and in the US-based Episcopal Church it is observed as the feast of "Saint Mary the Virgin: Mother of Our Lord Jesus Christ", while other Anglican provinces have a feast of the Dormition – the Anglican Church of Canada's Book of Common Prayer (1962), for instance, marks the day as the "Falling Asleep of the Blessed Virgin Mary".

The Anglican-Roman Catholic International Commission, which seeks to identify common ground between the two communions, released in 2004 a non-authoritative declaration meant for study and evaluation, the "Seattle Statement"; this "agreed statement" concludes that "the teaching about Mary in the two definitions of the Assumption and the Immaculate Conception, understood within the biblical pattern of the economy of hope and grace, can be said to be consonant with the teaching of the Scriptures and the ancient common traditions".

=== Continental Reformed views ===
The Protestant reformer Heinrich Bullinger believed in the assumption of Mary. His 1539 polemical treatise against idolatry expressed his belief that Mary's sacrosanctum corpus ("sacrosanct body") had been assumed into heaven by angels:

Hac causa credimus ut Deiparae virginis Mariae purissimum thalamum et spiritus sancti templum, hoc est, sacrosanctum corpus ejus deportatum esse ab angelis in coelum.

Translation:

For this reason we believe that the Virgin Mary, Begetter of God, the most pure bed and temple of the Holy Spirit, that is, her most holy body, was carried to heaven by angels.

== Feasts and related fasting period ==
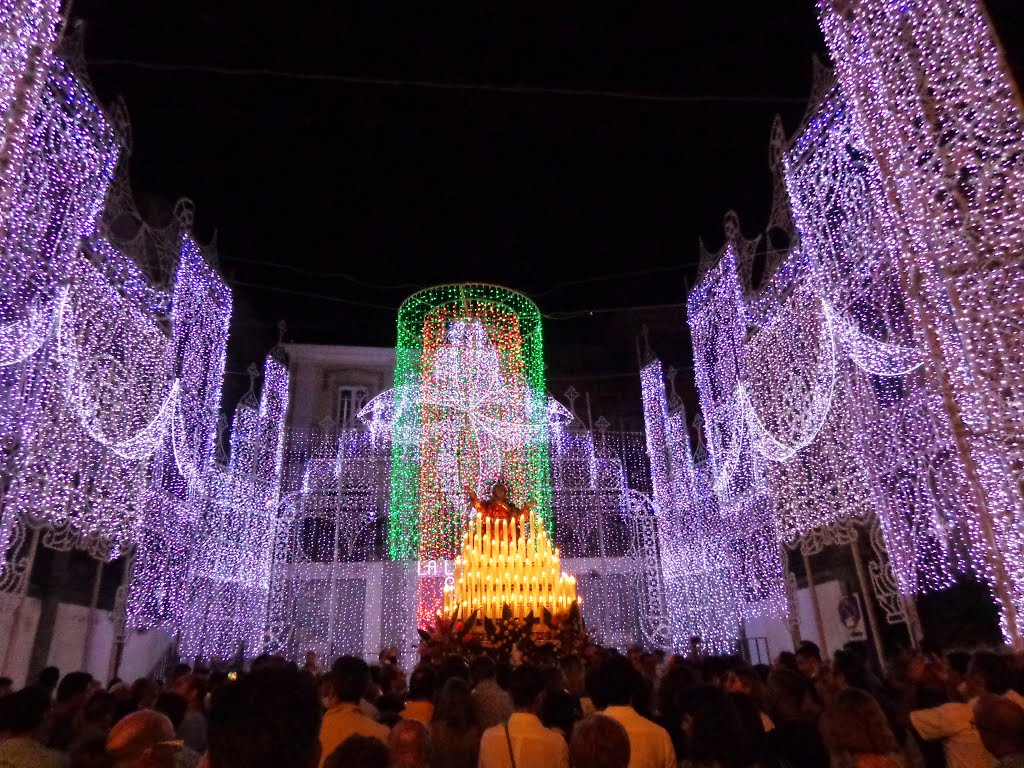
The feast of the Assumption of the Virgin Mary at Novara di Sicilia in August

An Eastern Orthodox tradition recommends a fast of fourteen days before the Feast of the Assumption of Mary. Fasting in the Eastern Orthodox Churches generally consists of abstinence from certain food groups; during the Dormition fast, one observes a strict fast on weekdays, with wine and oil allowed on weekends and, additionally, fish on the Transfiguration (6 August).

The Assumption is important to many Christians, especially Catholics and Orthodox, as well as many Lutherans and Anglicans, as the Virgin Mary's heavenly birthday (the day that Mary was received into Heaven). Belief about her acceptance into the glory of Heaven is seen by some Christians as the symbol of the promise made by Jesus to all enduring Christians that they too will be received into paradise. The Assumption of Mary is symbolised in the Fleur-de-lys Madonna.

The present Italian name of the holiday, Ferragosto, may derive from the Latin name, Feriae Augusti ("Holidays of the Emperor Augustus"), since the month of August took its name from the emperor. The feast was introduced by Bishop Cyril of Alexandria in the 5th century. In the course of Christianization, he put it on 15 August. In the middle of August, Augustus celebrated his victories over Marcus Antonius and Cleopatra at Actium and Alexandria with a three-day triumph. The anniversaries (and later only 15 August) were public holidays from then on throughout the Roman Empire.

The Solemnity of the Assumption on 15 August was celebrated in the Eastern Church from the 6th century. The Western Church adopted this date as a Holy Day of Obligation to commemorate the Assumption of the Blessed Virgin Mary, a reference to the belief in a real, physical elevation of her sinless soul and incorrupt body into Heaven.

=== Public holidays ===
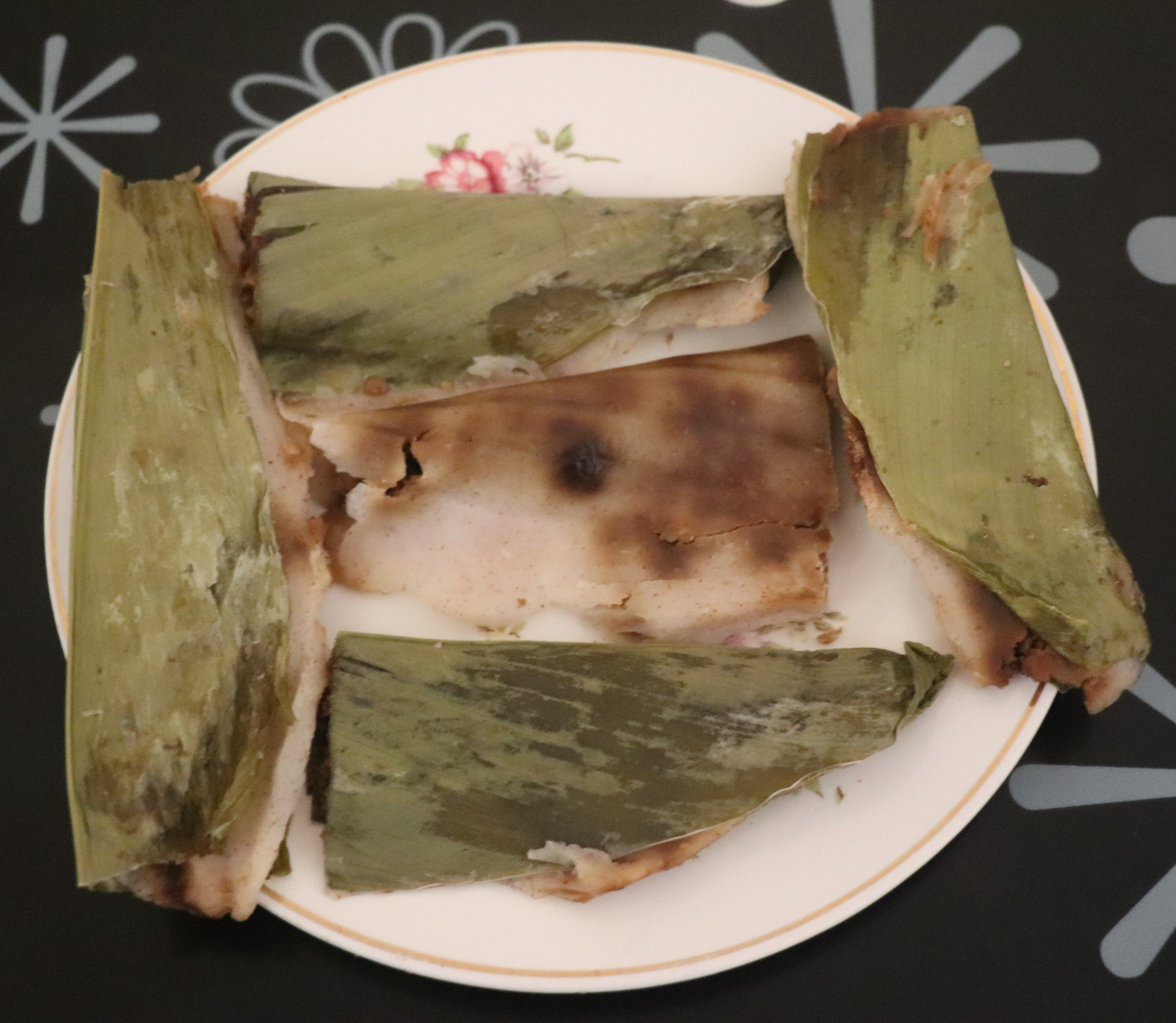
Patoleo (sweet rice cakes) are the pièce de résistance of the Assumption feast celebration among Goan Catholics.

15 August marks the earliest recorded Marian celebration, maintaining its status as a mandatory holy day and gaining even deeper theological weight after the 1950 papal dogma of the Assumption. Its historical roots trace back to ancient Palestine, where an early 6th-century eulogy on Saint Theodosius by Bishop Theodore of Petra recorded that local monks annually honored the Mother of God through a solemn memorial feast. As referred above, emperor Mauritius in 602 established the feast as a public holiday across his dominions. Its official title was the "Falling Asleep of the Mother of God" (Koίμησις Θεοτόκου).

Assumption Day is today a nationwide public holiday in Andorra, Austria, Belgium, Burundi, Cameroon, Central African Republic, Chile, Republic of Congo, Côte d'Ivoire, Croatia, Colombia, Costa Rica, Cyprus, East Timor, France, Gabon, Greece, Georgia, Republic of Guinea, Haiti, Italy, Lebanon, Liechtenstein, Lithuania, Luxembourg, Republic of North Macedonia, Madagascar, Malta, Mauritius, Monaco, Montenegro (Albanian Catholics), Paraguay, Philippines (Maragondon, Cavite), Poland (coinciding with Polish Army Day), Portugal, Romania, Rwanda, Senegal, Seychelles, Slovenia, Spain, Syria, Tahiti, Togo, and Vanuatu; and was also in Hungary until 1948.

It is also a public holiday in parts of Germany (parts of Bavaria and Saarland), Switzerland (in 14 of the 26 cantons) and Bosnia and Herzegovina. In Guatemala, it is observed in Guatemala City and in the town of Santa Maria Nebaj, both of which claim her as their patron saint. Also, this day is combined with Mother's Day in Costa Rica and parts of Belgium.

Prominent Catholic, Eastern Orthodox, and Oriental Orthodox countries in which Assumption Day is an important festival but is not recognised by the state as a public holiday include the Czech Republic, Ireland, Mexico, the Philippines and Russia. In Bulgaria, the Feast of the Assumption is the biggest Eastern Orthodox Christian celebration of the Holy Virgin. Celebrations include liturgies and votive offerings. In Varna, the day is celebrated with a procession of a holy icon, and with concerts and regattas.

In many places, religious parades and popular festivals are held to celebrate this day. In Canada, Assumption Day is the Fête Nationale of the Acadians, of whom she is the patroness saint. Some businesses close on that day in heavily francophone parts of New Brunswick, Canada. The Virgin Assumed in Heaven is also patroness of the Maltese Islands and her feast, celebrated on 15 August, apart from being a public holiday in Malta it is also celebrated with great solemnity in the local churches especially in the seven localities known as the Seba' Santa Marijiet. The Maltese localities which celebrate the Assumption of Our Lady are: Il-Mosta, Il-Qrendi, Ħal Għaxaq, Il-Gudja, Ħ'Attard, L-Imqabba and Victoria. The hamlet of Praha, Texas, holds a festival during which its population swells from approximately 25 to 5,000 people.

In Anglicanism and Lutheranism, the feast is now often kept, but without official use of the word "Assumption". In Eastern Orthodox churches following the Julian Calendar, the feast day of Assumption of Mary falls on 28 August.

In the Maronite Church, the Assumption of Mary is known as the 'Assumption of the Holy Mother of God' and is celebrated on 15 August. This feast holds a significant place in the Maronite liturgical calendar, reflecting the deep veneration of Mary within the church.

The Maronite liturgy for the Assumption includes unique prayers and hymnody that celebrate Mary's assumption into heaven. The celebration often features processions and pilgrimages to Marian shrines, with the Our Lady of Harissa shrine in Harissa, Lebanon, being a particularly notable site where thousands of pilgrims gather each year to honor Mary on her feast day.

The celebration of the Assumption in the Maronite Church underscores its connection to the universal Christian tradition while preserving its distinct Syriac heritage and practices.

== Art ==
The earliest known use of the Dormition is found on a sarcophagus in the crypt of a church in Zaragoza in Spain dated c. 330. The Assumption became a popular subject in Western Christian art, especially from the 12th century, and especially after the Reformation, when it was used to refute the Protestants and their downplaying of Mary's role in salvation. Angels commonly carry her heavenward where she is to be crowned by Christ, while the Apostles below surround her empty tomb as they stare up in awe. Caravaggio, the "father" of the Baroque movement, caused a stir by depicting her as a decaying corpse, quite contrary to the doctrine promoted by the church; more orthodox examples include works by El Greco, Rubens, Annibale Carracci, and Nicolas Poussin, the last replacing the Apostles with putti throwing flowers into the tomb.

== See also ==
- Assumption, a disambiguation page which includes many places named after the Assumption of Mary
- Ascension of Jesus
- Coronation of Mary
- Resurrection of Jesus Christ
- Entering heaven alive
