= Apostolic constitution =

Catholic legislation

An apostolic constitution (Latin: constitutio apostolica) is the most solemn form of legislation issued by the Pope. It is one of several types of papal bull that can be issued by the Holy See.

This high-level document normally deals with matters related to the governance and structure of the Catholic Church such as confirming laws, regulations, or institutions within the Church.

Apostolic constitutions are issued as papal bulls because of their solemn, public form. Among types of papal legislation, apostolic letters issued motu proprio are next in solemnity. Examples include the "Constitution on the Liturgy" (Sacrosanctum Concilium) and the "Constitution on the Catechism of the Catholic Church." Another example is Pope Pius XII's Munificentissimus Deus, the dogma of the Virgin Mary's Assumption.

By their nature, apostolic constitutions are addressed to the public. Generic constitutions use the title apostolic constitution and treat solemn matters of the church, such as the promulgation of laws or definitive teachings. The forms dogmatic constitution and pastoral constitution are titles sometimes used to be more descriptive as to the document's purpose.

== Sources ==
- Huels, John M. "A theory of juridical documents based on canons 29-34", Studia Canonica, 1998, vol. 32, no. 2, pp. 337–370.
- Beal, John P., James A. Coriden, Thomas J. Green. New Commentary on the Code of Canon Law: Commissioned by the Canon Law Society of America (New York: Paulist Press, 2000).
