= Patronages of the Immaculate Conception =

Catholic designations

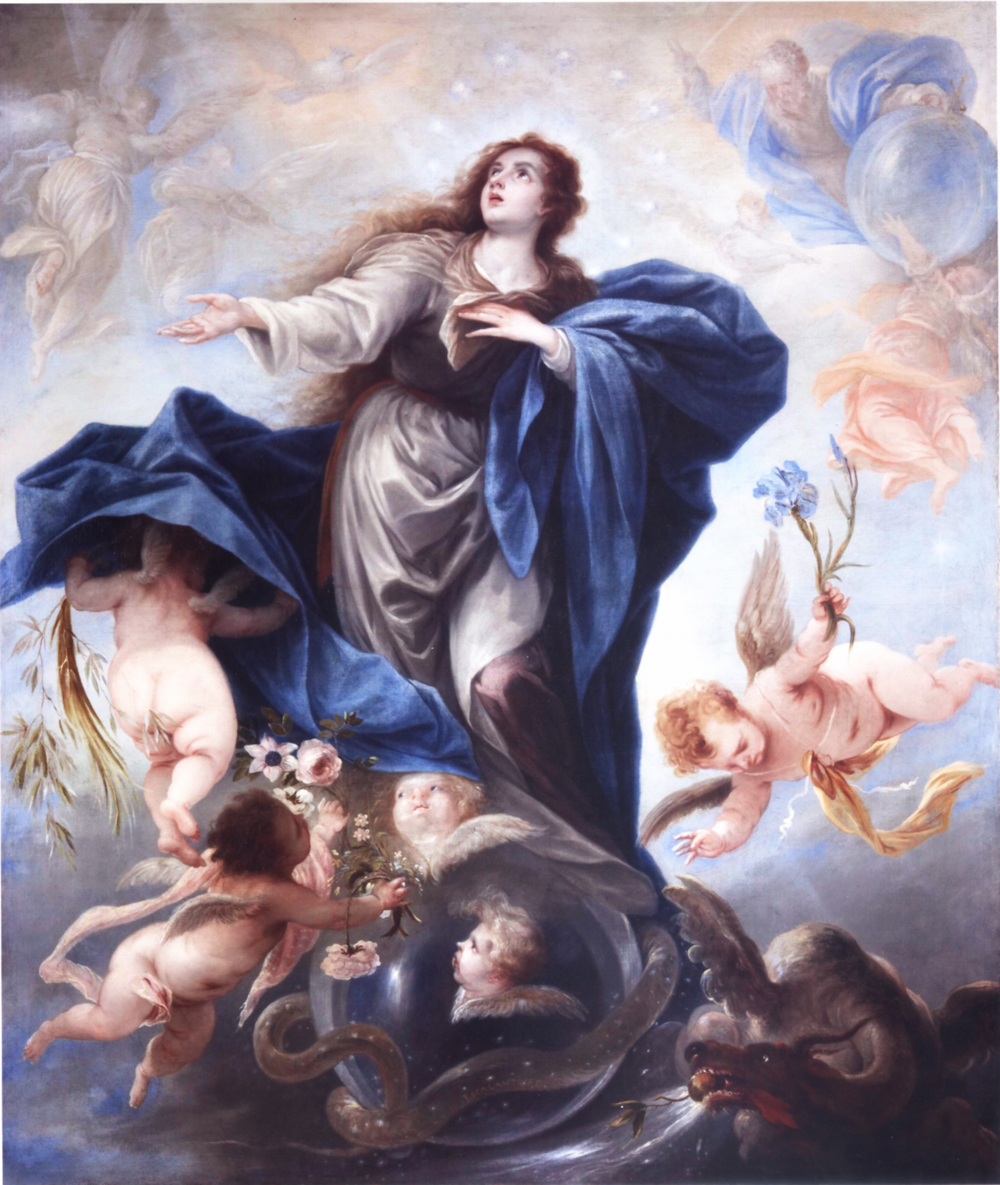
La Inmaculada Concepción de Maria by Juan Antonio de Frías y Escalante. Oil painting on canvas. Museum of Fine Arts. Córdoba, Spain.

In the Catholic Church, several locations around the world invoke the patronage of the Immaculate Conception. Catholic diocesan authorities with the expressed and written approval of the Pope in countries including Brazil, Korea, the Philippines, Spain, and the United States designate the Blessed Virgin Mary as their principal patroness.

As part of the patronage, the Feast of the Immaculate Conception is often observed both religiously and culturally within these countries. Numerous national parades, processions and cultural festivities are associated with this patronage ranging from public holidays to holy day of obligation. Several Popes have conferred this title of patronage, sometimes initiated by bishops.

The list below enumerates the various countries by which the pope through a bull has formally granted the Immaculate Conception as the patroness of the people and its land or kingdom.

The list of pontifical declaration does not include Ireland, Monaco, Nicaragua and Portugal.

== Brazil ==
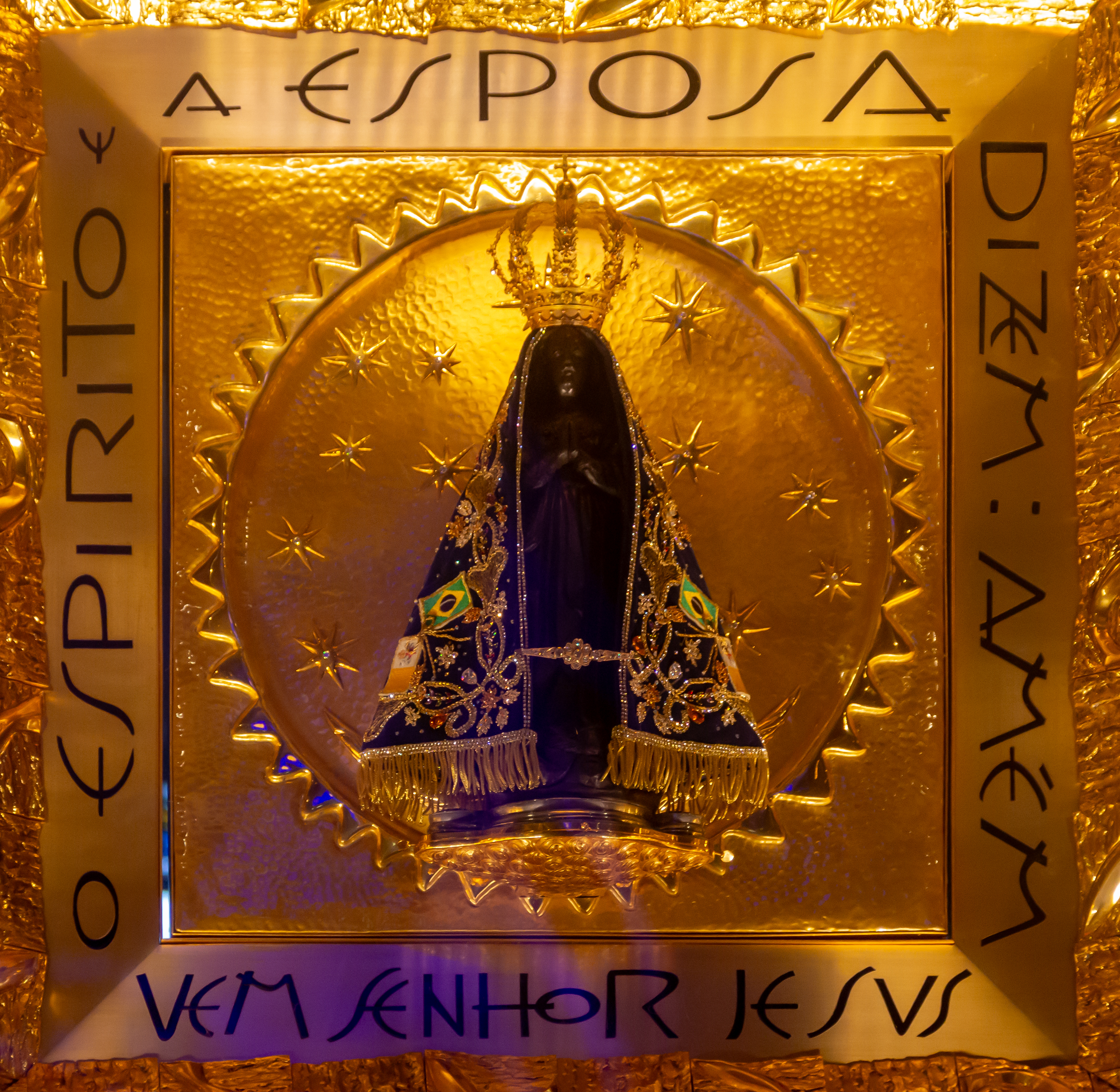
An image of the Immaculate Conception statue as Our Lady of Aparecida that is venerated as national patroness in Aparecida, Brazil.

The Blessed Virgin Mary is the patroness of Brazil under the localized title Our Lady of Aparecida (Our Lady of Immaculate Conception (who) Appeared).

On 8 December 1904 Pope Pius X granted a canonical coronation to the Brazilian image. The decree mentions the 1904 solid gold crown given to the image (assumingly from Isabel, Princess Imperial of Brazil). The devotion was researched and approved by Cardinal Camillo Laurenti, Prefect of the Sacred Congregation of Rites. The papal bull was signed and witnessed by Cardinal Eugenio Pacelli.

Pope Pius XI declared Mary under this title patroness of Brazil through a bull of 16 July 1930, signed by Cardinal Secretary of State Eugenio Pacelli. The decree indicated that Pope Leo XIII granted the approval on the devotion of the image under the title Nossa Senhora de Conceicao Aparecida (stylized as Fossa Behihora de Gonceigao Apparecida).

Pope John XXIII granted a Pontifical decree of coronation Quidquid ad Pietatam on 17 August 1961 for a namesake image in Conselheiro Lafaiete for Archbishop Caruana, crowned in 1963.

Pope Paul VI granted the image her first golden rose on 12 August 1967. Pope John Paul II consecrated a new shrine of the Immaculate Conception and on the same date raised it to the rank of minor basilica on 4 July 1980.

== Korea ==
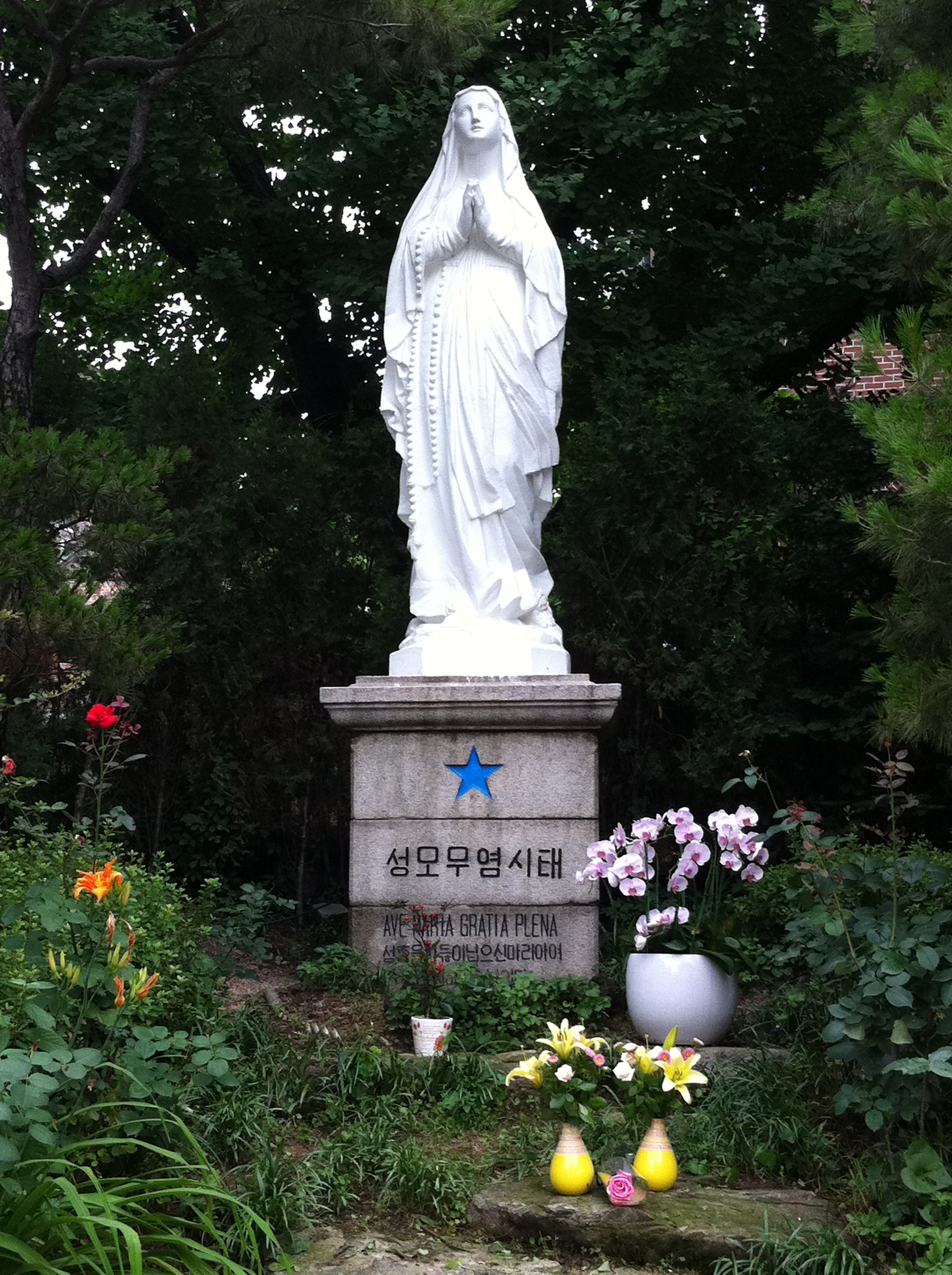
A 1948 French image of the Immaculate Conception at the Myeongdong Cathedral in Seoul, Korea.

Amidst Christian suspicion and persecution at the time, Pope Gregory XVI invested ecclesiastical interest in strengthening the first bishopric in Korea. In 1831, he established the first and only Apostolic Vicariate in Korea which survived no foreign Catholic priests since the anti-Catholic persecutions that went on earlier that year. According to Cardinal Nicolas Cheong Jin-suk, in 1841, Pope Gregory XVI solemnly dedicated the Korean Catholic Church to the Virgin Mary under the title "Immaculate Virgin".

On 6 May 1984, Pope John Paul II reiterated this patronage by entrusting the Republic of Korea to the Virgin Mary, given at the Myeong-dong Cathedral of the Immaculate Conception in Seoul, Korea. In the Apostolic Letter, John Paul II noted that Bishop Imbert Bum first consecrated Korea to the Immaculate Conception in 1837, followed by Bishop Jean Joseph Ferréol in 1846 along with Saint Joseph as its co-patron in the village of Surich’igol, nearby the city of Gongju. According to the papal brief, a similar re-dedication of patronage to the Immaculate Conception was invoked on by the French Bishop Gustave Charles Mutel on 29 May 1898, when the cathedral was ceremoniously opened to the Korean public.

== Philippines ==
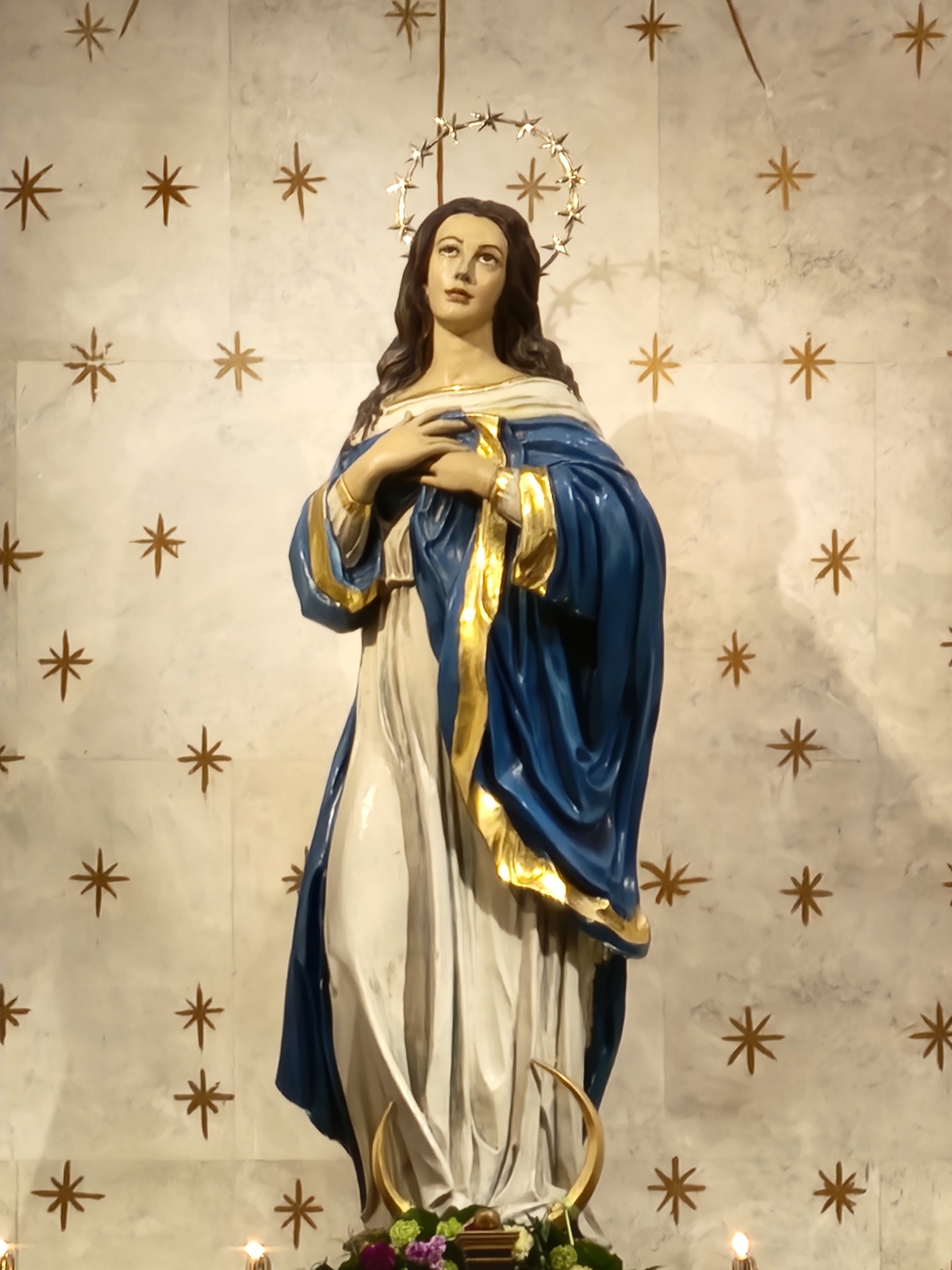
The polychromed bronze statue of the Immaculate Conception in Manila Cathedral, sculpted by the Italian national artist Vincenzo Assenza.

On 6 February 1578, Pope Gregory XIII through his bull Illius Fulti Præsidio, erected the Diocese of Manila and decreed that its cathedral should be under the invocation of the Conception of the Blessed Virgin Mary.

Pope Clement VIII granted the same invocation to the cathedrals of Nueva Segovia and Cáceres by decree of 13 August 1595.

Pope Pius X granted the petition to continue using the privilege of blue vestments for the Feast of Immaculate Conception included in a list of indults granted to the Philippines, dated 11 February 1910, executed by Cardinal Rafael Merry del Val.

Pope Pius XII through the Apostolic Letter Impositi Nobis of 12 September 1942, declared the Virgin Mary under the title of the Immaculate Conception as principal patroness of the Philippines with Saints Pudentiana and Rose of Lima as secondary patronesses, mentioning that the 1907 Provincial Council of Manila invoked Maria Immaculata as patroness of the whole Filipino people and that historical documents indicated Saint Pudentiana as patroness of the Philippines from the 16th century and Saint Rose of Lima from the 17th. Pius XII, through Quidquid ad Dilatandum, reiterated this declaration of patronage on 16 July 1958 through the Chancellor of Apostolic Briefs, Gildo Brugnola who signed and executed the decree. The bull only affected those patronesses of the Philippines that were ordinally ranked. Since 1571, Pudentiana was principal patroness of the Philippines; and since 1670, Rose of Lima was principal patroness of the Indies, thereby also becoming a de jure principal patroness of the Philippines. The two patronesses were demoted to secondary status in deference to the Blessed Virgin as the Immaculate Conception.

Pope John XXIII issued a pontifical decree of coronation for the Marian image titled "The Virgin of Immaculate Conception of Namacpacan" that was granted to Bishop Juan Callanta y Sison on 7 September 1959, signed by the Canon Secretary Giulio Barbella and notarized by Secretary of the Apostolic Dataria, Marco Martini. The rite of coronation was executed by the Apostolic Nuncio to the Philippines, Salvatore Siino.

Pope John Paul II honored the venerated image of Immaculate Conception in Malabon a canonical coronation which was crowned later on 7 December 1986.

Pope Benedict XVI granted a canonical coronation for the following images:

- In Pasig, crowned on 7 December 2008
- in Malolos Cathedral, crowned on 10 March 2012.

Pope Francis granted a canonical coronation for the following images:

- In the Minor Basilica of the Immaculate Conception in Santa Maria, Bulacan, crowned on 1 February 2020.
- In the Minor Basilica of the Immaculate Conception in Batangas City, crowned on 8 December 2022.

Among various fiestas and rituals honouring the Immaculate Conception's patronage is the annual Grand Marian Procession in Manila, where various statues of the Virgin Mary depicting her different titles and apparitions are borne in procession. The images are removed from their respective shrines and brought around the Spanish colonial capital district of Intramuros towards Manila Cathedral, which is dedicated to the Immaculate Conception. The event is administered both by the Cofradía de la Inmaculada Concepción and the Intramuros Administration, in cooperation with the City Government of Manila and the Roman Catholic Archdiocese of Manila. To date, six venerated Marian images with the patronal title in the Philippines have been granted a decree of Canonical Coronation by a pope.

The Philippines celebrated the 1954 Marian year by releasing a commemorative stamp featuring an image of the Immaculate Conception, and re-printed again in 1958. On 29 March 2017, the Philippine government through the House of Representatives approved House Bill No. 5241 declaring 8 December as a non-working official holiday, and was officially signed into law on 23 December 2017 as Republic Act No. 10966 by former Philippine President Rodrigo Duterte in honour of the Blessed Virgin Mary as its national patroness.

Additionally, following the decision of the Filipino Bishops in 1954, an Act of Consecration of the Philippine Islands to the Immaculate Virgin Mary is to be recited on this day in all churches and chapels in the archipelago. An adapted form issued by the Catholic Bishops' Conference of the Philippines was also composed based on the Act of Consecration written by Pope John Paul II on 25 March 1984, currently in use for both the feast of the Immaculate Heart of Mary and the feast of the Immaculate Conception.

== Spain ==
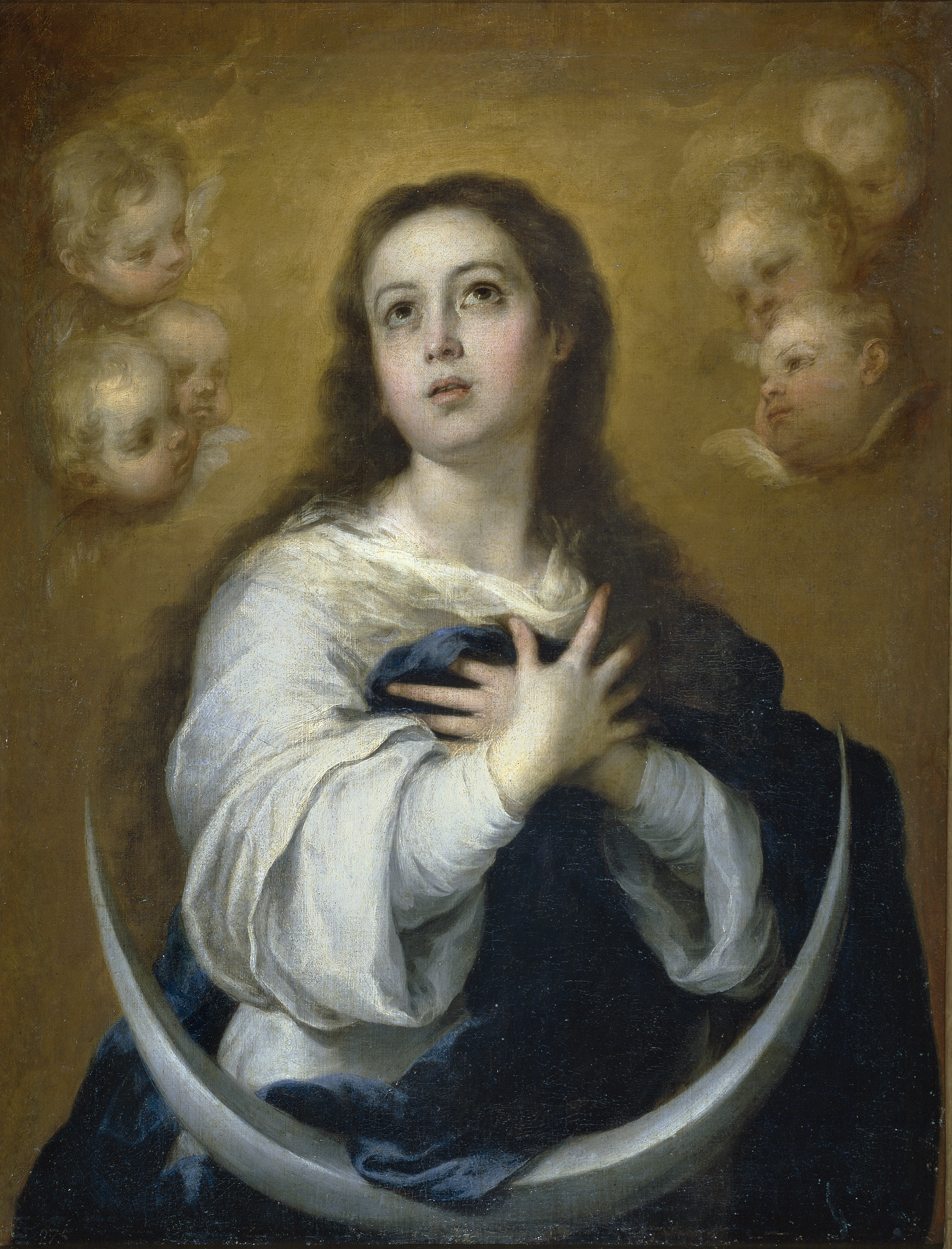
La Inmaculada Purisima Concepcion de Maria by Bartolomé Esteban Murillo, Prado, Spain.

By pontifical decree, the Immaculate Conception alone is the universal and national patroness of Spain, by virtue of a papal mandate issued by Pope Clement XIII on 8 November 1760, while James the Greater remains, the same pope declared, the primary patron of the Spanish people. The feast of the Immaculate Conception is also one of the nine national and public holidays and a holy day of obligation.

The patronage settles the dispute between a heated religious debate during the mid-1600s, when followers of the mythical figure James Matamoros wished to impose him as the national patron saint versus the followers of Teresa of Avila.

On 11 September 1759, the elected members of the Royal Spanish Court petitioned King Charles III of Spain to request from the pope the "…universal patronage of Our Lady of the Immaculate Conception in all the Kingdoms of Spain and the Indies".

With the papal bull Quantum Ornamenti of 8 November 1760, Pope Clement granted the request of King Charles III, declaring the Virgin Mary, under the title of the Immaculate Conception, patroness of the whole of the Kingdom of Spain along with its eastern and western territories, (in the Americas and the Philippines). The emblem of the Order of Charles III is an image of the Immaculate Conception.

In another document, Pope Clement granted that the Spanish clergy could celebrate the Mass and the Liturgy of the Hours on the feast and its octave with the texts used by the Franciscans rather than that in the Tridentine Roman Missal and Roman Breviary as revised by Pope Pius V, which did not attach the adjective "Immaculate" to the phrase "Conception of the Blessed Virgin Mary". On the Feast of the Immaculate Conception, the brief Dance of the Sixteen (Spanish: Los Seises) (the actual number of choirboys dancing has been reduced to twelve) is performed by choirboys dressed in white and blue in the Cathedral of Seville. Since 1864, Mass vestments for the feast in Spain may be blue at the expressed permission with decree from the Sacred Congregation of Rites which thus became extended to the former territories of the Spanish crown and kingdom. Many other Spanish cultural customs and religious processions are associated with the feast.

Pope Pius XII (1954) in San Cristóbal de La Laguna, Tenerife and Pope Benedict XVI (2011) in Linares and Pope Francis (2020) in Herencia granted a pontifical decree of Canonical coronation bearing the same Patronal title.

Another image bearing the same Marian title located in Castilleja de la Cuesta was crowned by the local townspeople in a so-called “episcopal coronation” in 2013.

== United States ==
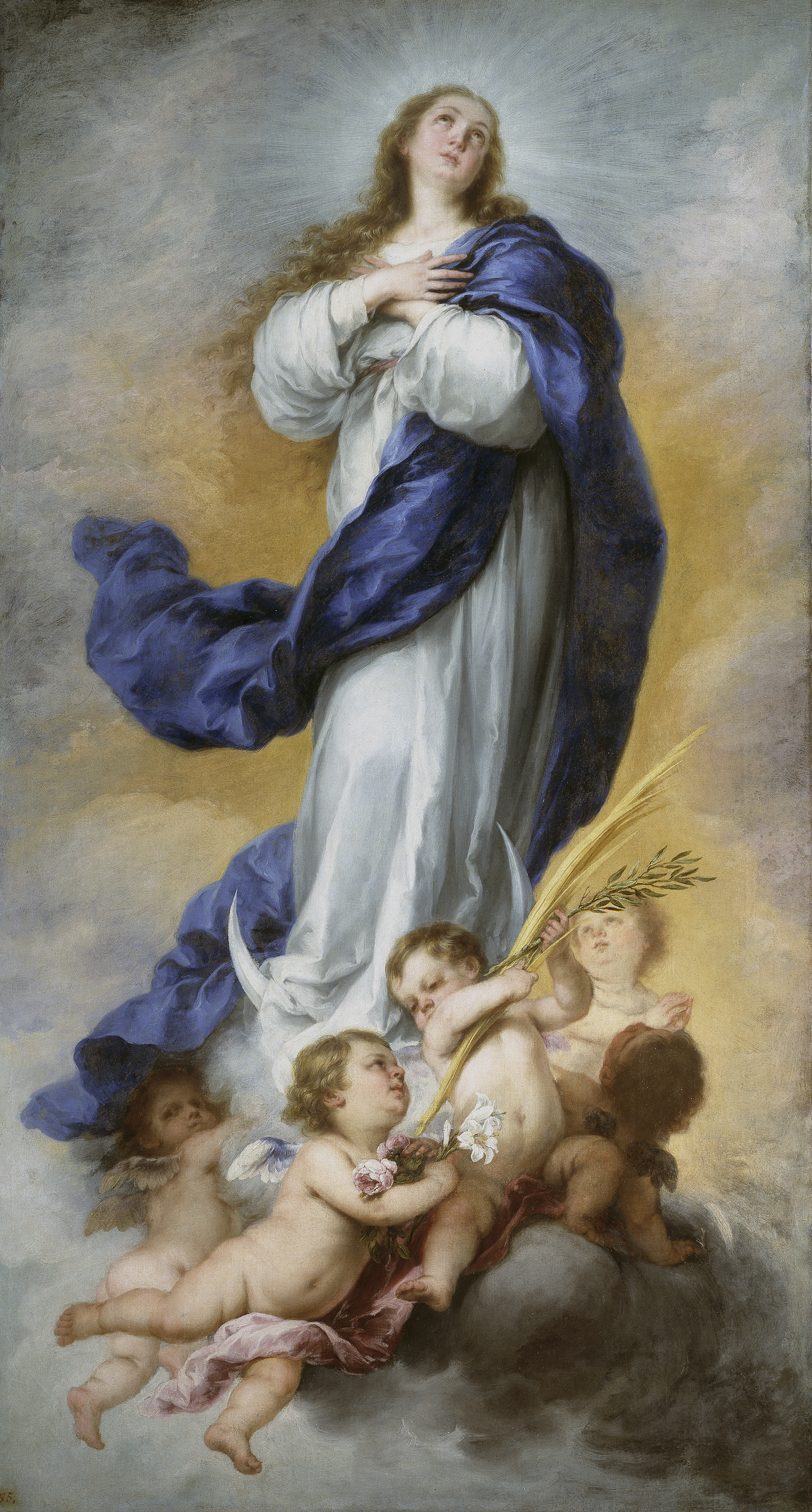
A mosaic rendition of the Immaculate Conception of the Royal Palace of Aranjuez sent by Pope Pius XI in 1923, permanently enshrined at the Basilica of the National Shrine of the Immaculate Conception of Washington D.C.

On 13 May 1846, the United States bishops unanimously chose "the Virgin Mary, conceived without sin", as patroness of the country, a decision approved by Pope Pius IX on February 7 of the following year and published in a decree of 2 July 1847.

On 10 April 1848, a voting process and discussion was made on the regularisation of the rubrics for the Feast of the Immaculate Conception to be celebrated in that country. By 1849, this decree was published at the 7th Provincial Council of Baltimore. The decrees were signed and witnessed by Cardinal Giacomo Filippo Fransoni.

On 8 July 1914, Pope Pius X sent an apostolic letter to the Archbishop of Baltimore, Cardinal James Gibbons approving the patronage of the Immaculate Conception for the new construction site of the National Shrine of the Immaculate Conception.

On 10 April 1919, Pope Benedict XV reiterated this patronage and stated that he had ordered a mosaic of Our Lady of the Immaculate Conception to be made in the Vatican Mosaic Studio for the shrine's high altar.

In 1923, Pope Pius XI chose a mosaic version of Bartolomé Esteban Murillo's La Purísima Inmaculada Concepción for installation at the shrine, the image is a mosaic rendition of the venerated Immaculate Conception enshrined at the Royal Palace of Aranjuez, now installed in the largest Roman Catholic church in the United States of America.

On 22 August 2013, Pope Benedict XVI granted a decree of Canonical coronation for a Marian image in the Cathedral of the Immaculate Conception (Lake Charles, Louisiana).

== List of countries claiming patronage without a pontifical decree ==
=== Ireland ===
On 7 December 1650, the Irish Catholic Confederation, on the verge of its final defeat by the Cromwellian conquest of Ireland, declared the Virgin Mother of God, under the title of the Immaculate Conception, patroness of the Kingdom of Ireland and was cited six days later:

By a unanimous vote of the Supreme Assembly it was decreed that the Virgin Mother of God, under her title of her Immaculate Conception, should be solemnly and publicly proclaimed patroness of the Kingdom of Ireland, and that as a perpetual memorial to the happy event, the feast of the Immaculate Conception should be solemnly observed in Ireland from that day forward until the end of time."

=== Monaco ===
The principality of Monaco claims patronage of their state to the Immaculate Conception of Mary. The feast is a highly regarded celebration in their monarchy, with the Monaco Cathedral rebuilt in 1903 and renamed under this specific patronage on 11 June 1911. The feast is also celebrated each December 8 as a designated public holiday honoring wives and mothers.

On 8 December 1958, the post office of Monaco issued a commemorative postal stamp celebrating the Feast of the Immaculate Conception, both honoring the images of Pope Pius IX and Pope Pius XII with the postal value of One Franc.

=== Nicaragua ===
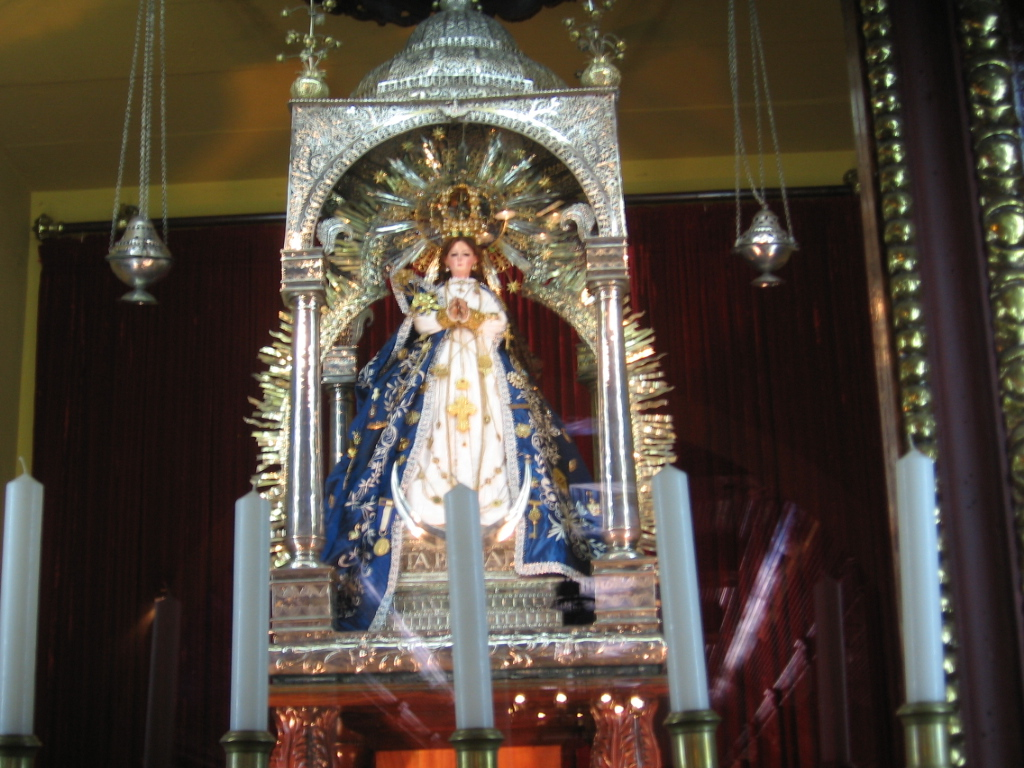
In 1562, Don Lorenzo Ahumada, a brother of Teresa of Avila, brought to Nicaragua this statue of the Immaculate Conception of El Viejo. Pope John Paul II granted a Canonical coronation to the venerated Marian image on 28 December 1989.

The Immaculate Conception is venerated as patroness of the Nicaraguan people.

A letter of 1673 cites a document of 5 January 1626 according to which the statue was given by Teresa of Avila to her brother, who brought it to where it now is and died there. Another document, drawn up in 1751 after a visit to the settlement of El Viejo, where the statue is kept, and citing the 1673 letter, states that the name "Nuestra Señora del Viejo" was a reference to Teresa's brother, who was then an old man ("viejo" being Spanish for "old"). It describes the statue and its adornment, including a crown. A traditional story is that the statue was brought by an old hermit who, when the ship he was travelling on refused to leave the harbour, explained that the statue wished to remain there. A Carmelite report of 1786 recorded the tradition that the statue was a gift of Teresa to her brother or uncle, who was governor of the locality, and that, when he attempted to take the statue with him when transferred to another governorship, storms repeatedly drove his ship back, so that he left the statue there. Another source gives the name of Teresa's brother as Don Lorenzo de Cepeda and repeats the story of the storm forcing him to leave the statue in what was then called Chamulpa and is now El Viejo. The statue was ceremoniously crowned by the local townspeople in 1747.

John Paul II issued the papal bull for the Canonical coronation Quod est Ecclesiæ for the image on 28 December 1988, which was signed and executed by Cardinal Agostino Casaroli. The coronation ceremony took place on 6 May 1989. On 7 February 1996, John Paul II visited the shrine on his second apostolic visit to Nicaragua. He later issued a Pontifical decree titled Inter Insignes Sacras which raised the sanctuary of El Viejo to the status of Minor Basilica on 20 December 1995.

On 7 October 1996, the Episcopal Conference of Nicaragua conferred the title "The National Shrine of the Immaculate Conception of El Viejo"; and on 13 May 2001, the Episcopal Bishops' Conference of Nicaragua declared the Virgin Mary under this title be the national patroness of the country.

On 4 August 2012, Pope Benedict XVI sent the image a golden pearl rosary in recognition of the piety of the Nicaraguan people's. That same year, Nicaragua celebrated the 450th annual patronage of the Immaculate Conception with grand parades and national festivities.

A popular custom (especially among children) in Nicaragua during this time is to gather in a group and sing several Marian hymns in front of people's houses where a statue of the Immaculate Conception is enshrined. Similar to caroling songs during Christmas time, children receive special candies or sweet treats given by the household after the conclusion of singing Marian hymns.

In Leon, Nicaragua, the feast is begun by a special day of penitence conducted each December 6, when the faithful take part in publicly cleaning all the silver treasures and accessories donated to the statue. The event is also celebrated with a tradition called Gritería or "Shouting" in honor of the Virgin Mary's conception and is composed of grand parades, fireworks, candlelight processions, songs and various religious activities related to the conception of the Blessed Virgin Mary and her maternal role in Roman Catholicism. Similar practices are observed in various other Catholic countries.

=== Portugal ===
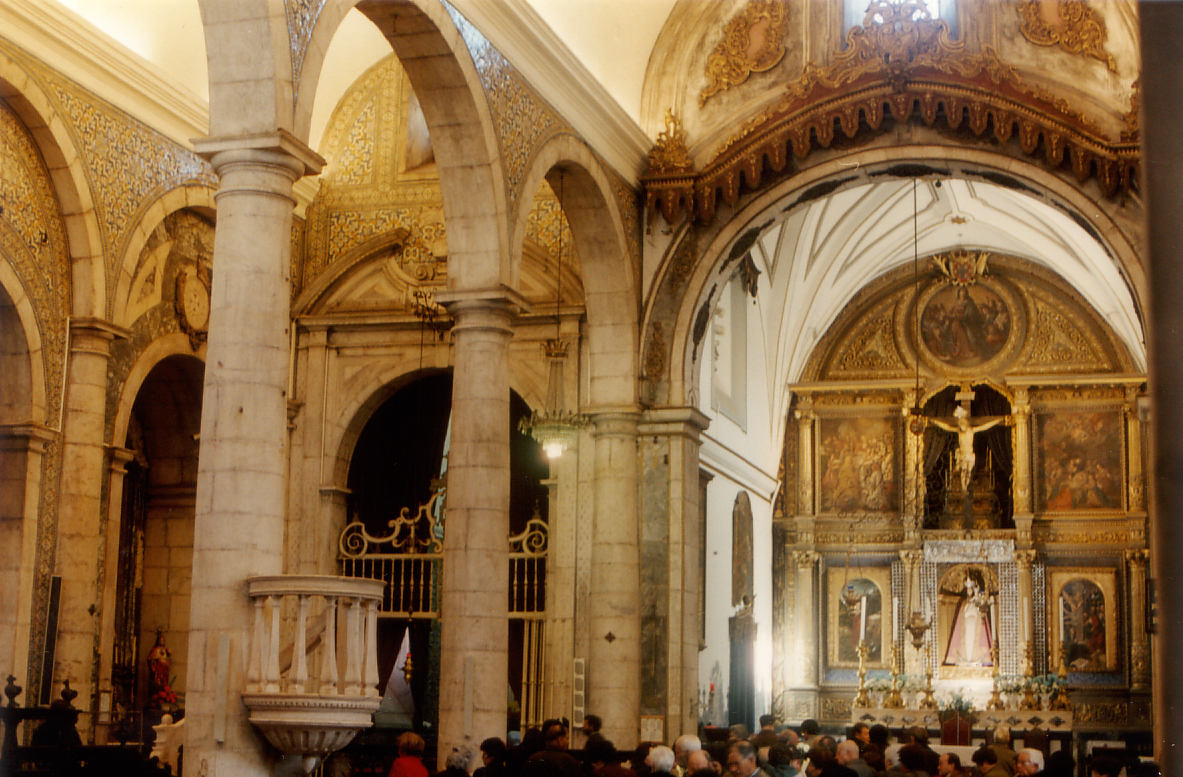
The shrine of the Immaculate Conception, consisting of Madonna and Child as patroness of Portugal.

By royal decree under the House of Braganza, the Immaculate Conception is the patroness of Portugal. An image of the Immaculate Conception venerated in the Shrine of Our Lady of Conception of Villa Vicosa was donated by Nuno Álvares Pereira.

On 25 March 1646, King John IV of Portugal proclaimed Our Lady of the Immaculate Conception the nation's patroness, so that 8 December is a special feast day in Portugal. Upon crowning the image since that time, the Portuguese monarchs of the House of Braganza renounced wearing a crown on their heads.

In addition, the king minted both gold and silver coins bearing his seal while on the other side bears the Immaculate Conception with the Latin phrase titled Tutelaris Regni. In 1946, at the 300th anniversary of this royal declaration, the government of Portugal also released a postal stamp commemorating its patronage featuring the image of the Virgin Mary.

The first document invoking the Marian patronage is found the king's address to the National Royal Chambers dated 30 June 1654 and was next followed again in the Royal Provision of 1646.

The statue's design is unlike most Immaculate Conception images, as the Virgin Mary carries a child Jesus rather than portrayed as being raised into Heaven. On 6 February 1818, the Order of the Immaculate Conception of Vila Viçosa was erected in the Virgin Mary's patronal honor by King John VI of Portugal. The feast marks one of the four national holidays in the Portugal.

== See also ==
- Patronal feast day
- National Shrine of the Immaculate Conception
- Cathedral-Basilica of the Immaculate Conception
- Congregation of the Immaculate Conception
- Feast of the Immaculate Conception
- Immaculate Mary
- Marian doctrines of the Catholic Church
- Original sin
- Perpetual virginity of Mary
- Roman Catholic Marian art
- Virgin birth of Jesus

== Bibliography ==
- Le Franc, Martin. The Conception of Mary – A Rhyming Translation of Book V of Le Champion des Dames by Martin Le Franc (1410-1461). Ed. and trans. Steven Millen Taylor. Lewiston, New York: The Edwin Mellen Press, 2010.
