= Immaculate Conception of El Viejo =

Title of Mary, mother of Jesus

The Immaculate Conception of El Viejo La Purisima - La Chinita
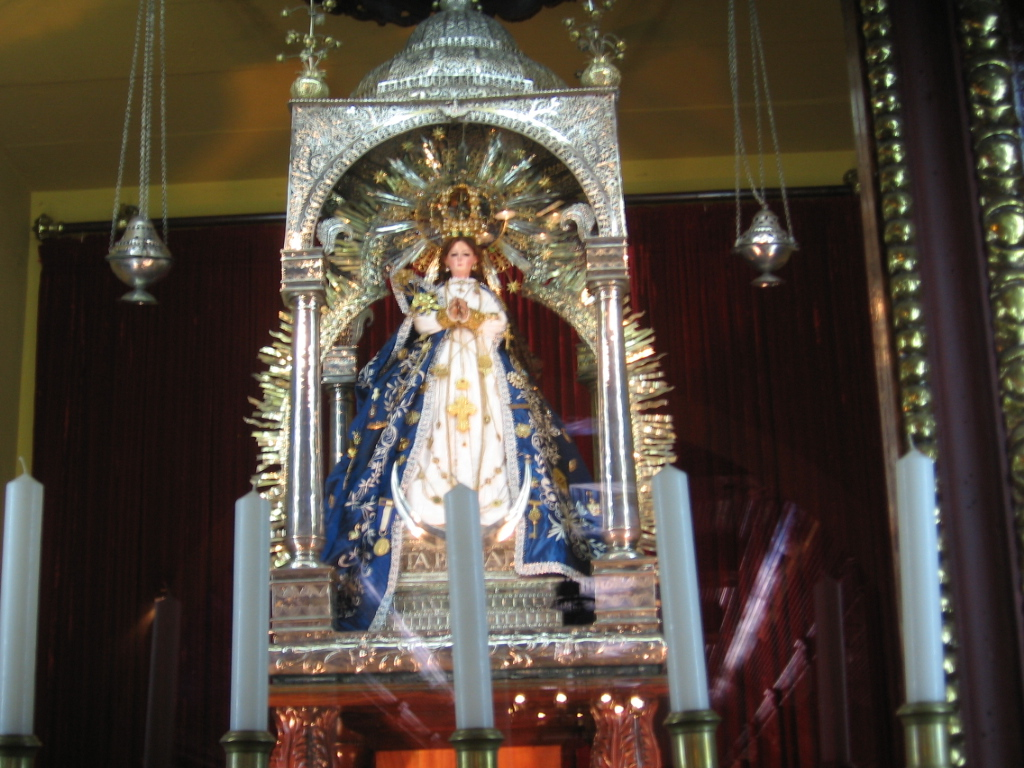
- The canonically crowned image enshrined within Minor Basilica of El Viejo
- Location: El Viejo, Nicaragua
- Date: 16th century
- Approval: Pope John Paul II; Pope Benedict XVI
- Shrine: Minor Basilica of the Immaculate Conception of El Viejo
- Patronage: Nicaragua (Episcopal Conference)

The Immaculate Conception of El Viejo informally known as La Purisima or La Chinita is a title of the Blessed Virgin Mary associated with a carved wooden image venerated by the Roman Catholic Nicaraguan faithful who believe it to be miraculous.

The image is widely known among Nicaraguan Catholics who trace the image's origins to the former ownership of Saint Teresa of Avila and was brought by her brother Rodrigo Ahumada to their land in the mid-16th century.

== History ==
The image measures 42 centimeters and is believed to have been brought to Nicaragua by Rodrigo Ahumada, the brother of Saint Teresa of Avila which pious legends claim had ownership prior to the arrival in the country. The image is believed to have a final destination in Peru, but a storm ravaged their galleon ship. The natives in the area venerated the Marian image resulting in the donation to the present shrine, which is believed to be by divine appointment. In 1737, a solemn coronation by the townspeople was granted to the image.

A letter of 1673 cites a document of 5 January 1626 according to which the statue was given by Saint Teresa of Avila to her brother, who brought it to where it now is and died there. Another document, drawn up in 1751 after a visit to the settlement of El Viejo, where the statue is kept, and citing the 1673 letter, states that the name "Nuestra Señora del Viejo" was a reference to Saint Teresa's brother, who was then an old man ("viejo" being Spanish for "old"). It describes the statue and its adornment, including a crown.

A traditional story is that the statue was brought by an old hermit who, when the ship he was travelling on refused to leave the harbour, explained that the statue wished to remain there. A Carmelite report of 1786 recorded the tradition that the statue was a gift of Saint Teresa to her brother or uncle, who was governor of the locality, and that, when he attempted to take the statue with him when transferred to another governorship, storms repeatedly drove his ship back, so that he left the statue there. Another source gives the name of Saint Teresa's brother as Don Lorenzo de Cepeda and repeats the story of the storm forcing him to leave the statue in what was then called Chamulpa and is now El Viejo.

The solemn liturgical crowning of the statue by the natives took place in 1747. The papal bull of 28 December 1988 granted her the right to wear a Pontifical crown by Pope John Paul II, who also raised her sanctuary to the status of Minor Basilica on 20 December 1995.

== Pontifical approbations ==
- Pope John Paul II granted the following decrees:
  - Pontifical decree of Canonical coronation Quod est Ecclesiæ to the venerated image on 28 December 1988. The Papal bull was signed and executed by Cardinal Agostino Casaroli. The rite of coronation was executed on 6 May 1989.
  - Issued a Pontifical decree titled Inter Insignes Sacras which raised the sanctuary of El Viejo to the status of Minor Basilica on 20 December 1995.
- Pope Benedict XVI gifted the image a golden rosary with pearl ornamentation on 4 August 2012, in recognition of the 450th anniversary reflected by the piety of the Nicaraguan people. The rosary was delivered in person by the Secretary of the Pontifical Nunciature to Nicaragua, Monsignor Vincenzo Turturro.

== Religious iconography ==
The image is a traditional image of the Immaculate Conception, vested in precious fabrics and embroidered French bullion. The blue and white vestments of the Virgin are closely tied to the national flag of Nicaragua, while silver adornments are also part of her ensemble, a common precious metal found abundantly in the area.

== Feast and veneration ==
The feast of the Marian image is celebrated on December 8, the Feast of the Immaculate Conception. Various cultural festivities are associated with the image, such as the following:

- La Griteria or shouting on celebrating the Virgin Mary's conception at the main Cathedra
- The distribution of local sweet cakes and delicacies to children in offering to the Virgin by Caroling songs
- The procurement of fireworks and pyrotechnical displays
- The cleaning of silver ornaments for the image
- The nine-day Novena prayers offered leading up to her feast.
