= Minor Basilica of the Immaculate Conception (Batangas City) =

Roman Catholic church in Batangas, Philippines

Immaculate Conception Minor Basilica
- Minor Basilica and Parish of the Immaculate Conception
- Archdiocesan Shrine of Santo Niño ng Batangan
- Basílica Menor de la Inmaculada Concepción (Spanish); Basilika Menor ng Kalinislinisang Paglilihi at Arkidiyosesanong Dambana ni Santo Niño ng Batangan (Filipino)
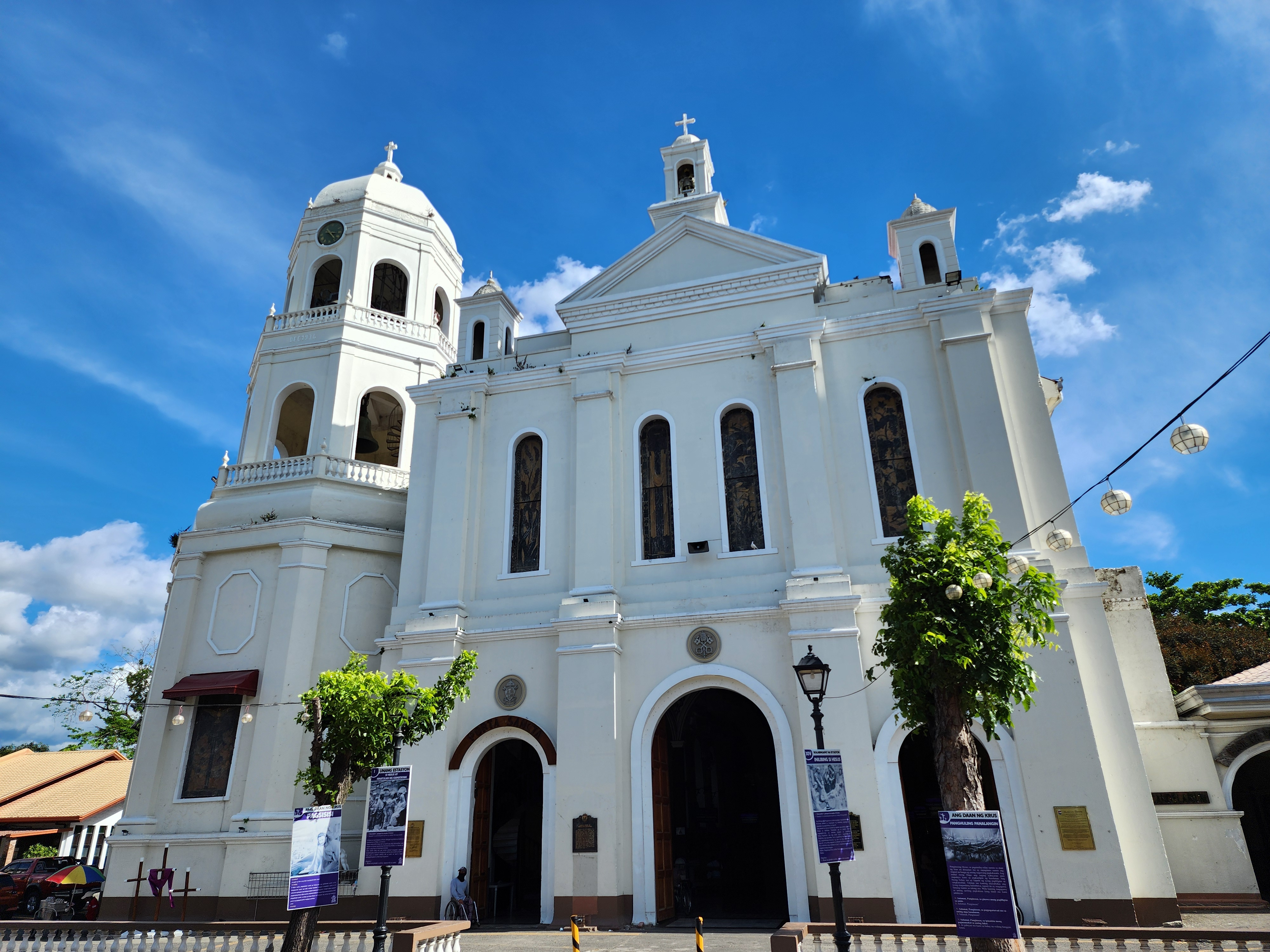
- Basilica facade in March 2024

- Location in Luzon Location in the Philippines
- 13°45′15″N 121°03′33″E
- Location: Batangas City, Batangas
- Country: Philippines
- Denomination: Roman Catholic

History
- Status: Minor Basilica
- Founded: 1614
- Dedication: Immaculate Conception
- Consecrated: February 2, 1857

Architecture
- Functional status: Active
- Architectural type: Church building
- Style: Neo-classical
- Groundbreaking: 1851
- Completed: February 2, 1857

Specifications
- Length: 71.35 m (234.1 ft)
- Width: 14.27 m (46.8 ft)
- Materials: Adobe and wood

Administration
- Province: Lipa
- Metropolis: Lipa
- Archdiocese: Lipa
- Deanery: Immaculate Conception

Clergy
- Rector: Angel Marcelo M. Pastor

The Minor Basilica and Parish of the Immaculate Conception, alternatively known as the Archdiocesan Shrine of Santo Niño de Batangan, is a minor basilica in Batangas City, Philippines. It is under the jurisdiction of the Archdiocese of Lipa. It was made an independent parish in 1614 under the advocation of the Immaculate Conception. It is one of the oldest churches in Batangas.

== History ==
=== Earlier churches ===
Catholic priest Diego de Mojica was said to have constructed the first temporary church made of light materials in 1578. The church was put under the title of the Immaculate Conception. The church was burned down by the fire that gutted the whole town in 1615.

In 1686, Jose Rodriguez began laying the new foundation of a new church made of stone. The main nave was finished in the same year with the help of Manuel del Buensuceso and the townspeople. Jose de San Bartolome completed the transept made of reef stone on 1706, and it was blessed in 1721. The church was gutted by fire again after a lightning bolt in 1747 and was repaired in 1756 during the time of Don Ramon Orendain.

=== Present church ===
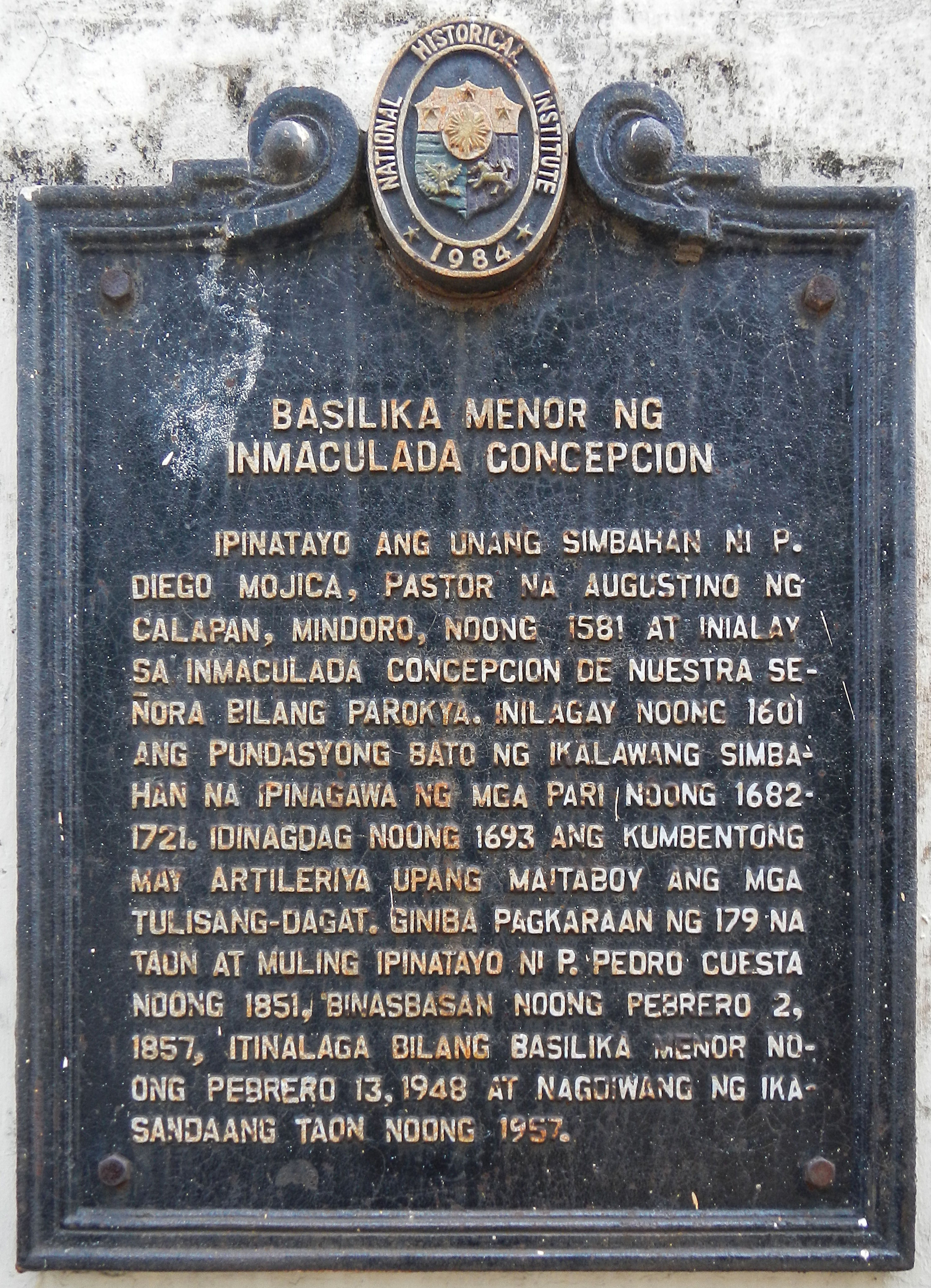
Church NHI historical marker installed in 1984

The former Father Provincial, Pedro Cuesta, demolished the old church which he found too small for the increasing population of the town and started the construction of the new one on the same site in 1851. He also built the strong fence of the atrium to enclose the church and convent. The church was damaged by earthquake in 1863 and repaired and reinforced with walls and buttresses. After the roof fell in 1880, it was repaired in 1884 by Bruno Laredo. The convent built in 1693, of reef stone and huge molave post withstood all the earthquakes until Melchor Fernández constructed a new one in 1792. It was later used as a school building by the Saint Bridget College. Later on, the second floor of the convent was demolished and was converted into a parish pastoral hall.

The church has undergone several restorations. The second and third stories of the belfry was completed in 1934. In 1936, the old windows were changed and 23 chandeliers were added. The façade collapsed during the April 8, 1942, earthquake and was repaired between 1945 and 1946. In 1954, the exterior was painted with general repairs in 1957. The exterior was beautified and the frescoes were retouched on the occasion of the centennial celebration.

=== Minor basilica and contemporary history ===
On February 13, 1948, the church was declared a minor basilica of the Immaculate Conception. The declaration was made upon the request of Lipa's bishop, Alfredo Verzosa.

The church temporarily closed to the public on April 8, 2017, after a series of earthquakes caused minor damage to the basilica, including the Taal Basilica. It reopened on December 2 after eight months of repairs.

On January 16, 2022, the basilica was also declared as the archdiocesan shrine of Santo Niño de Batangan.

=== Ivory image of La Inmaculada Concepcion de Batangan ===
The devotion to La Inmaculada Concepcion de Batangan, also known as La Batangueña, dates back to 1581 when the parish dedicated to her was established. In 1868, her image was enshrined, and miracles have been attributed to her intercession. It was elevated to a minor basilica in 1948, the second in the country. In 2018, the image received episcopal coronation, and in 2022, Pope Francis granted the pontifical coronation, both on the Solemnity of the Immaculate Conception.

=== Devotion to the black Santo Niño de Batangan ===
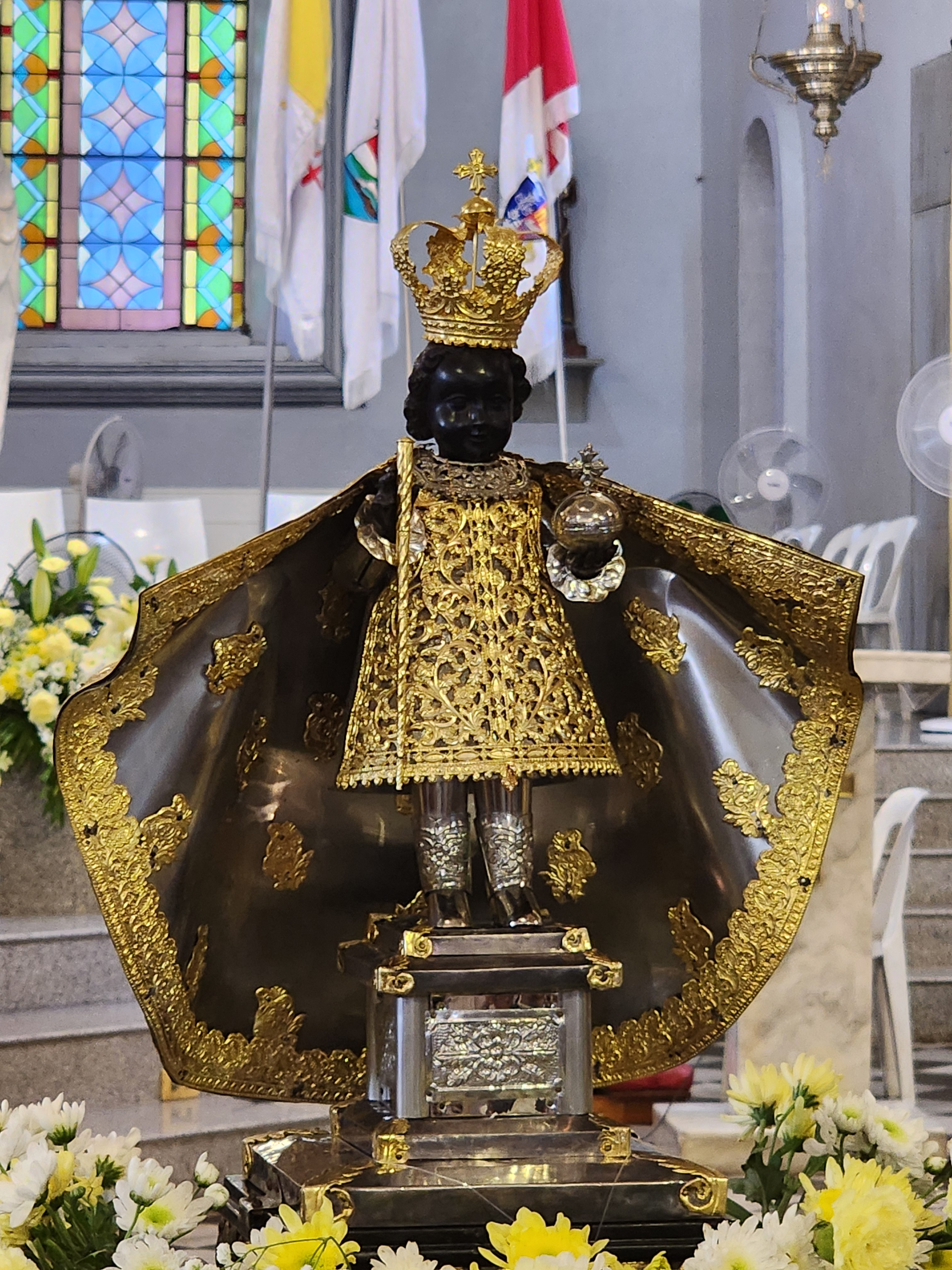
The famous black Santo Niño de Batangan

The black image of Santo Niño de Batangan is that of black image of the Child Jesus which is said to be a replica of the famed image of Santo Niño de Cebu. The image is standing on a base, wears a set of metal vestments: a metal dress and a butterfly-styled cape. The image also sports a crown, holding a globus cruciger and his left hand is in gesture of blessing.

== Architecture ==
The basilica was designed with a robust exterior in response to the threat posed by the destructive forces of volcanic eruptions, earthquakes and typhoon winds. Its 1.5-meter-thick (4.9 ft) walls, are supported by three massive buttresses on each side.

It also sports an octagonal belfry adjacent to the basilica. Underneath it is the baptistery.

== Gallery ==
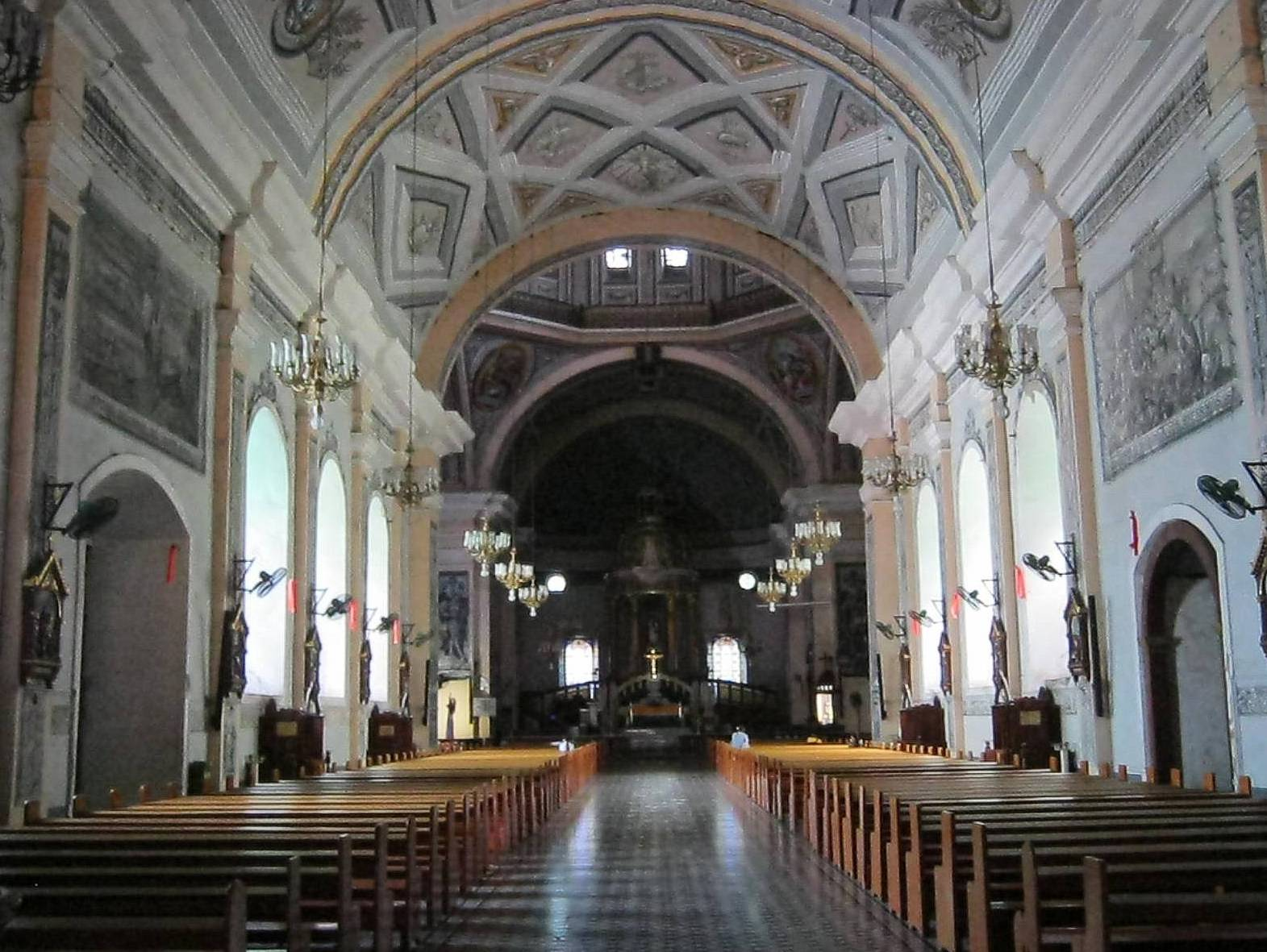
Church interior in 2014

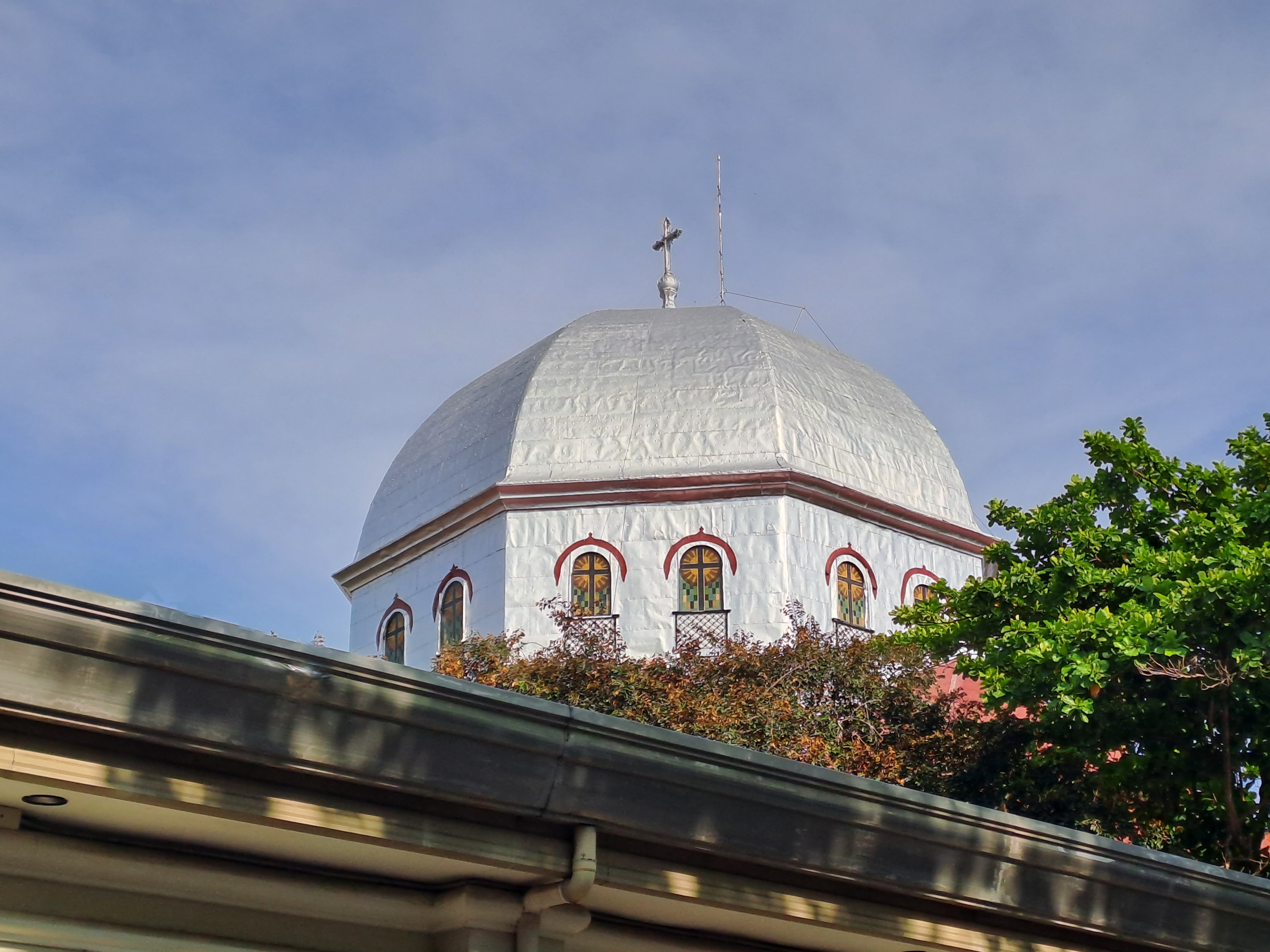
Dome

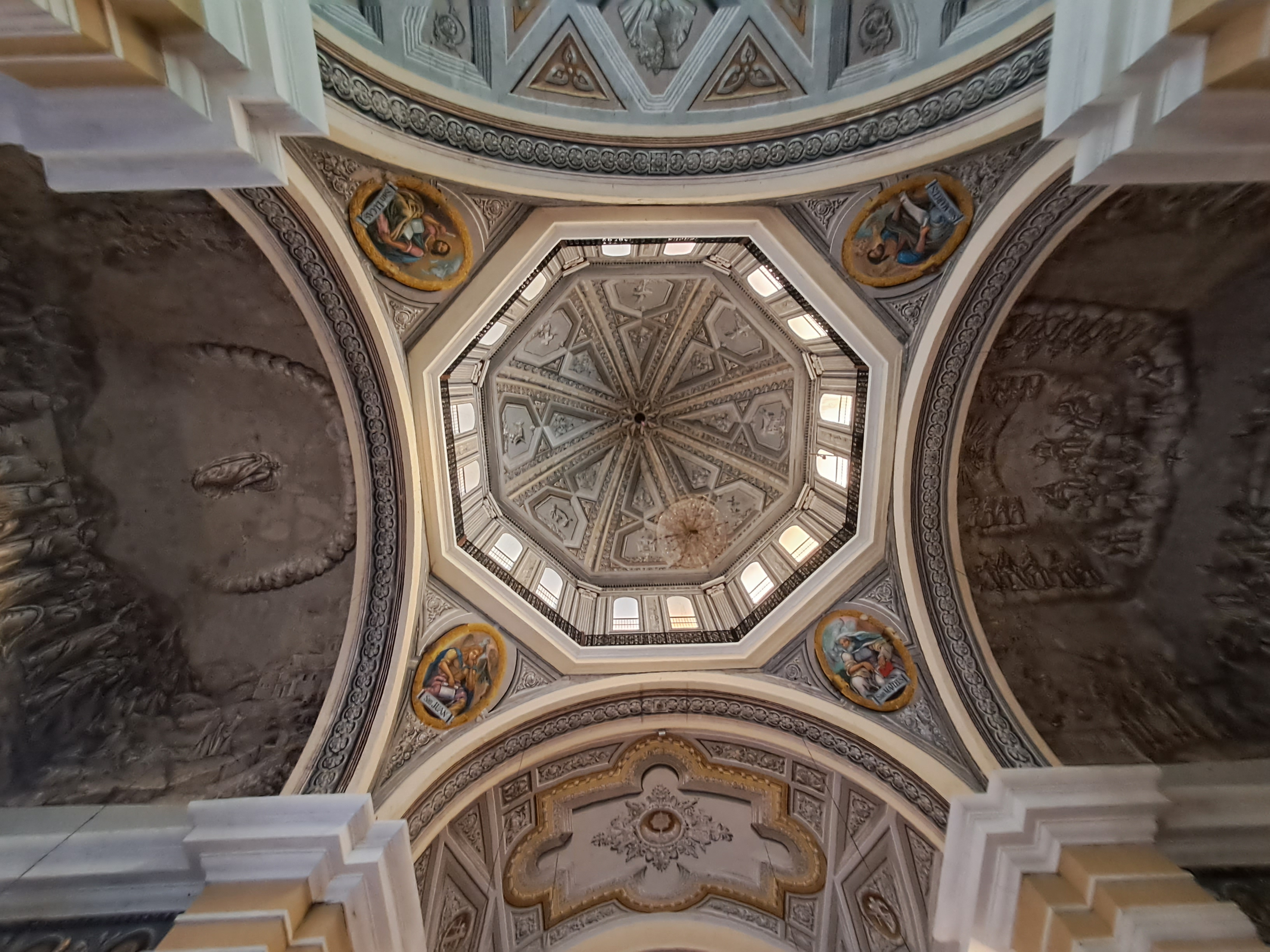
Dome interior

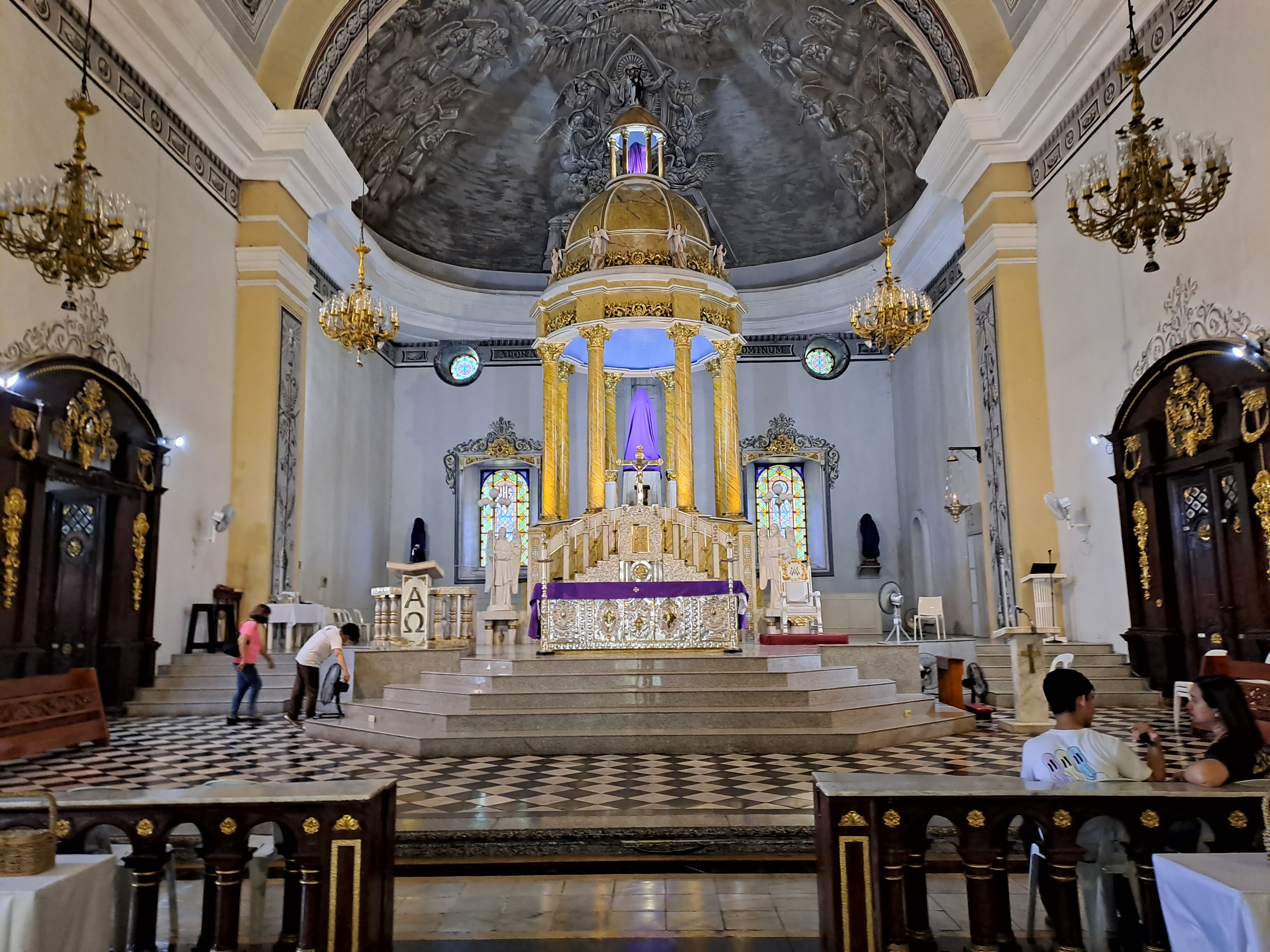
The altar with the Immaculate Conception veiled for Holy Week

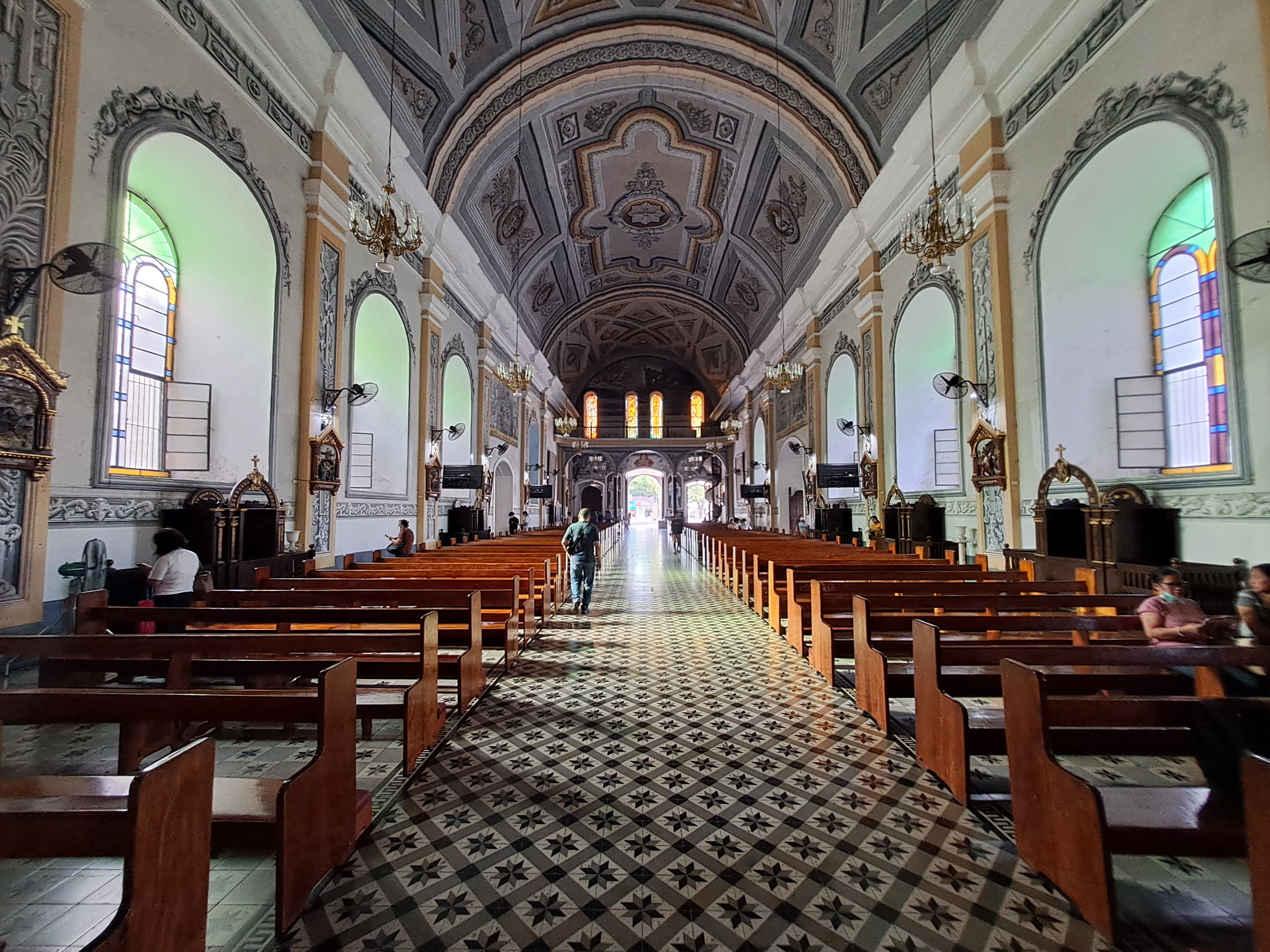
Central nave facing towards the exit

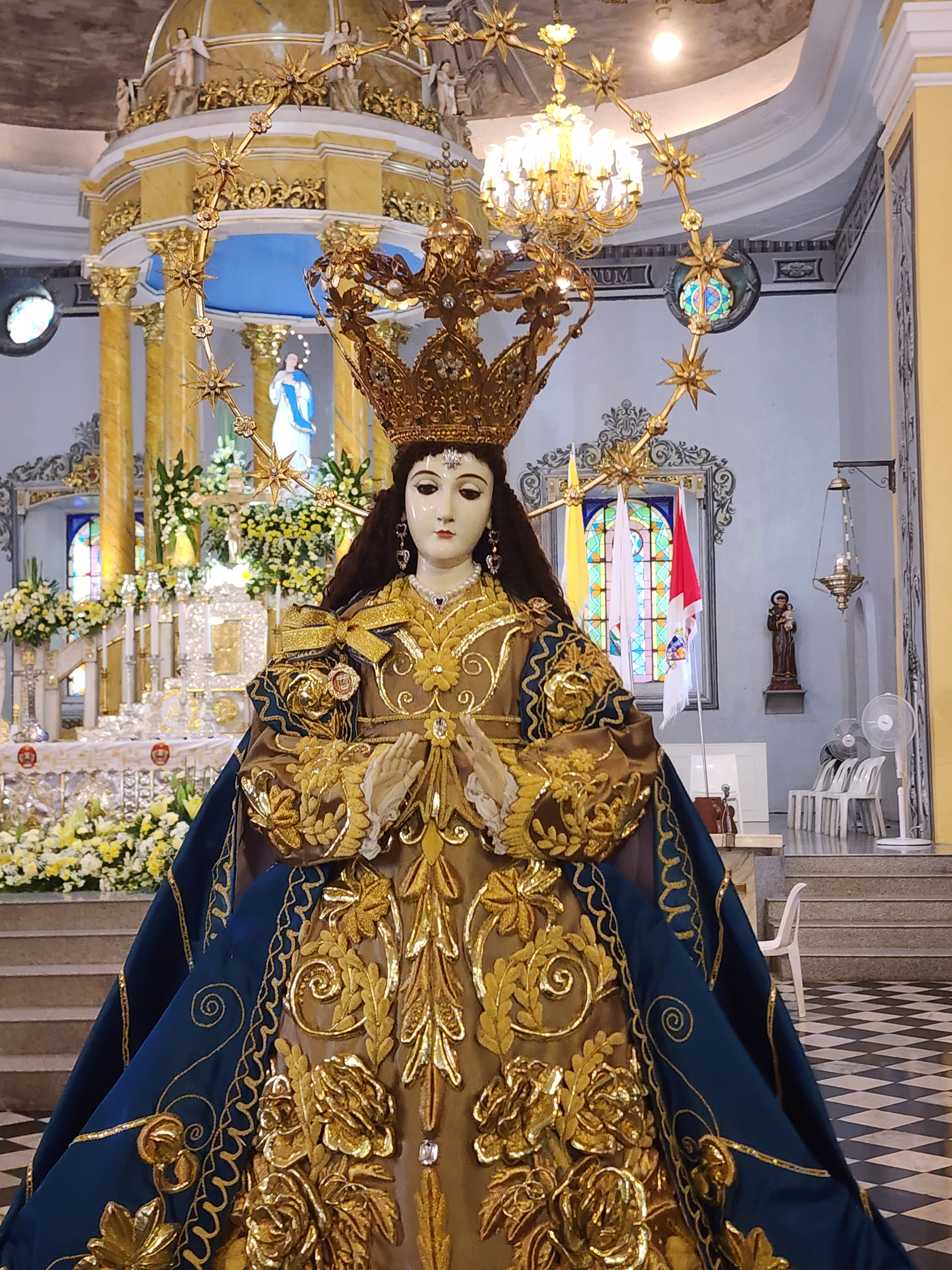
The venerated ivory image of the Virgin of Immaculate Conception
