= Feast of the Immaculate Conception =

Catholic feast and public holiday in some countries

Solemnity of the Immaculate Conception
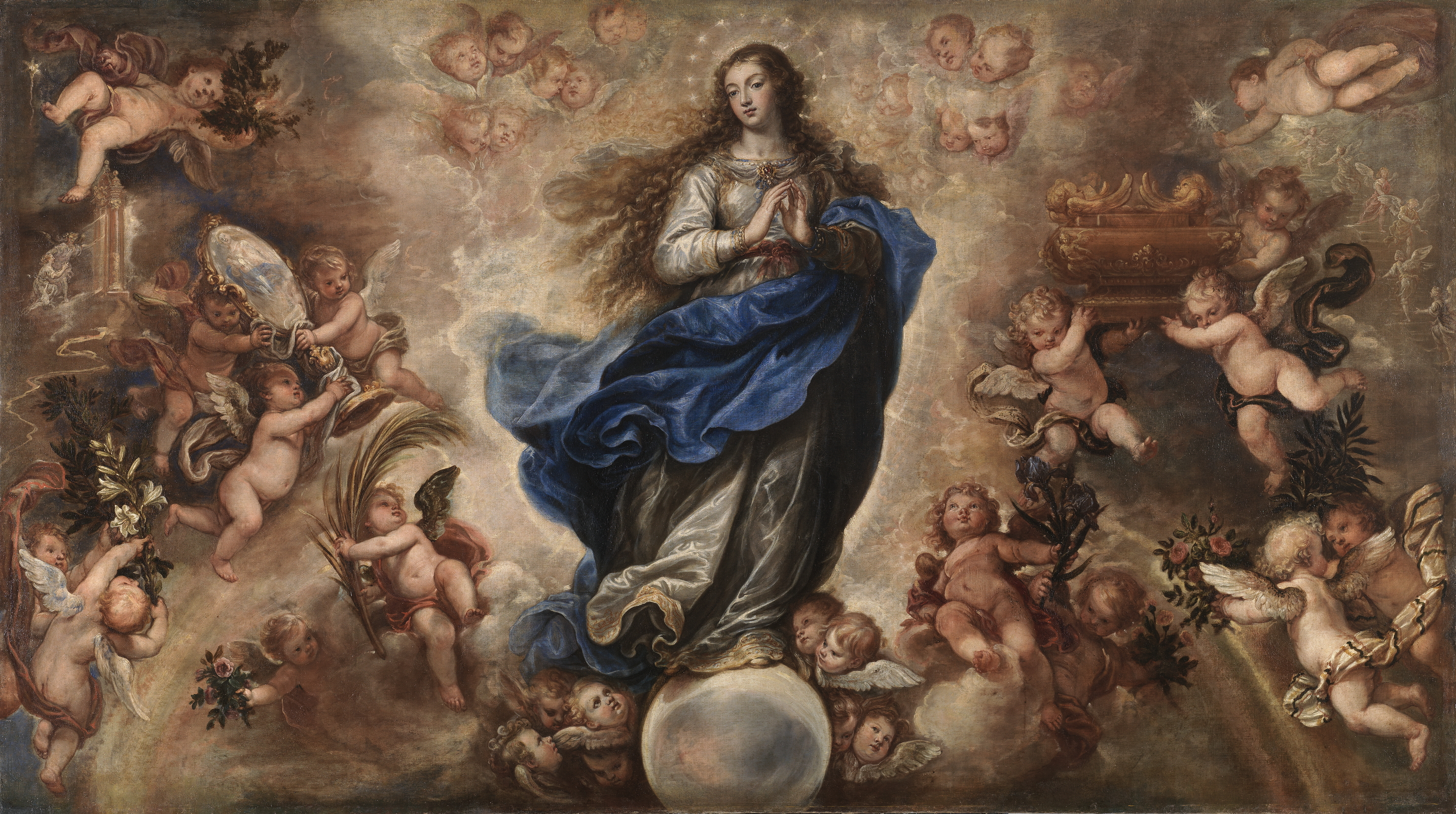
- La Inmaculada Concepción, by Francisco Rizi, Museo del Prado, 17th-century, oil on canvas
- Also called: Immaculate Conception Day
- Observed by: Latin Church
- Significance: The most pure and sinless conception of the Blessed Virgin Mary without original sin
- Celebrations: procession, fireworks
- Date: 8 December
- Related to: Nativity of Mary, Assumption of Mary

The Solemnity of the Immaculate Conception celebrates the Immaculate Conception of the Blessed Virgin Mary, on 8 December, nine months before the feast of the Nativity of Mary on 8 September. It is one of the most important Marian feasts in the liturgical calendar of the Latin Church.

By pontifical decree, it is the patronal feast day of Argentina, Brazil, Chile, Italy, Korea, Nicaragua, Paraguay, the Philippines, Spain, the United States, and Uruguay. By royal decree, it is designated as the day honoring the patroness of Portugal.

Since 1953, the Pope visits the Column of the Immaculate Conception in the Piazza di Spagna to offer expiatory prayers commemorating the solemn event.

The feast was solemnized as a holy day of obligation on 6 December 1708, by the papal bull Commissi Nobis Divinitus of Pope Clement XI. It is celebrated with Masses, parades, fireworks, processions, food and cultural festivities in honor of the Blessed Virgin Mary in Catholic countries.

== History ==
The Eastern Church first celebrated a Feast of the Conception of the Most Holy and All Pure Mother of God on 9 December, perhaps as early as the 5th century in Syria. The original title of the feast focused more specifically on Saint Anne, being termed Sylepsis tes hagias kai theoprometoros Annas ("conception of Saint Anne, the ancestress of God"). By the 7th century, the feast was already widely known in the East: on at least two occasions in the Acta of the Third Council of Constantinople (680-681), regarded as ecumenical by both the Catholic and Eastern Orthodox Churches, Mary is called "immaculate" (Achrantos).

Most Orthodox Christians reject the Scholastic definition of Mary's preservation from original sin. The feast associated with her immaculate conception, initially celebrated on 8 December, was translated to the Western Church in the 8th century. It then spread from the Byzantine Southern Italy to Normandy during the Norman dominance, eventually reaching England, France, Germany, and Rome.

In 1568, Pope Pius V revised the Roman Breviary, and though the Franciscans were allowed to retain the Office and Mass written by Bernardine dei Busti, this office was suppressed for the rest of the Church, and the office of the Nativity of the Blessed Virgin was substituted instead, the word "Conception" being substituted for "Nativity".

According to the papal bull Commissi Nobis Divinitus, dated 6 December 1708, Pope Clement XI mandated the feast as a holy day of obligation which is to be celebrated in future years by the faithful. Furthermore, the pontiff requested that the papal bull be notarized in the Holy See to be further copied and reproduced for dissemination.

Prior to Pope Pius IX's definition of the Immaculate Conception as a Catholic dogma in 1854, most missals referred to it as the Feast of the Conception of the Blessed Virgin Mary. The festal texts of this period focused more on the action of her conception than on the theological question of her preservation from original sin. A missal published in England in 1806 indicates the same collect for the feast of the Nativity of the Blessed Virgin Mary was used for this feast as well.

The first move towards describing Mary's conception as "immaculate" came in the 11th century. In the 15th century, Pope Sixtus IV, while promoting the festival, explicitly tolerated both the views of those who promoted it as the Immaculate Conception and those who challenged such a description, a position later endorsed by the Council of Trent.

The proper for the feast of the Conception of the Blessed Virgin Mary in the medieval Sarum missal merely addresses the fact of her conception. The collect for the feast reads:

O God, mercifully hear the supplication of thy servants who are assembled together on the Conception of the Virgin Mother of God, may at her intercession be delivered by Thee from dangers which beset us.

== Latin Church ==
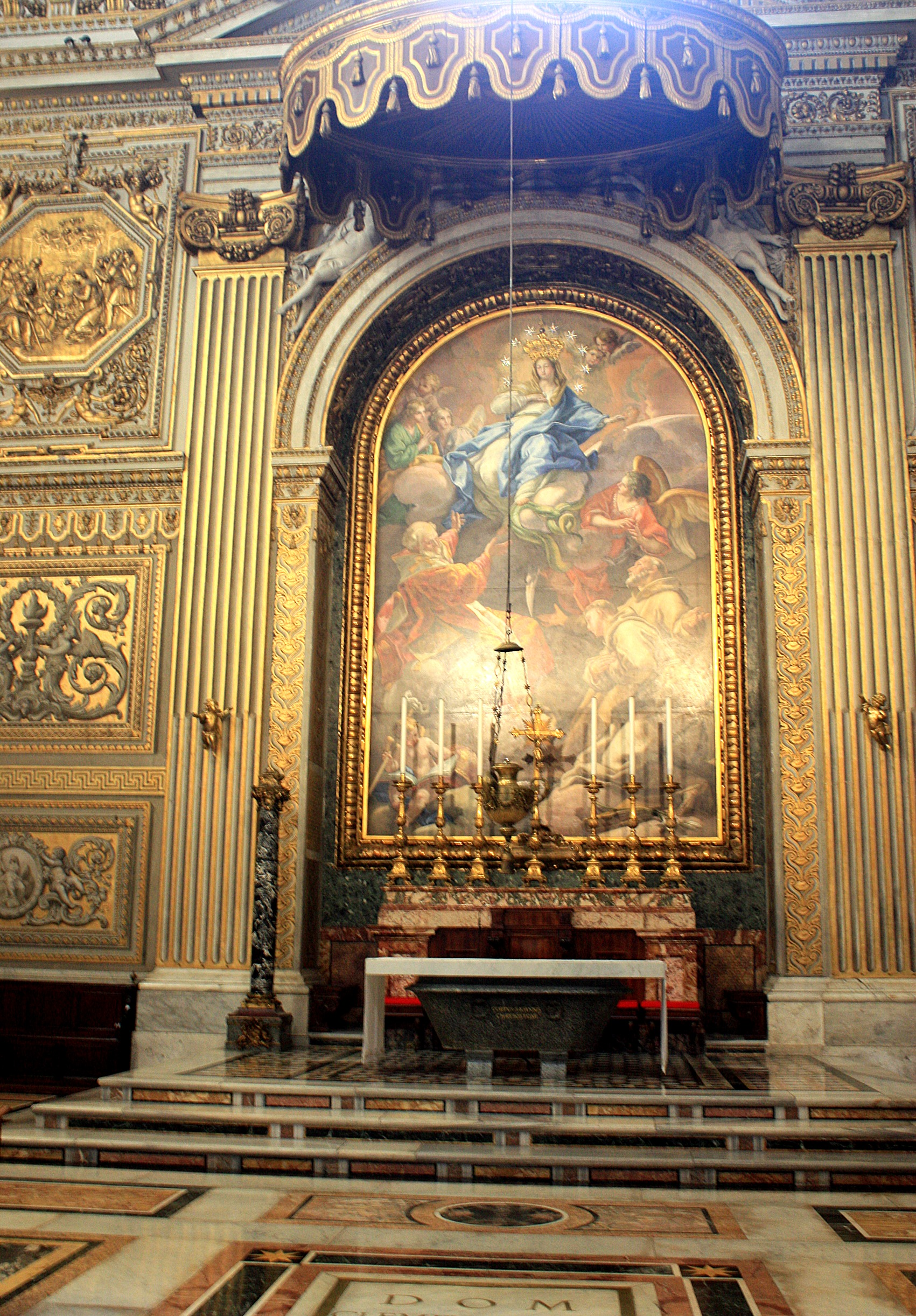
A notable image of the Immaculate Conception venerated within Saint Peter's Basilica. It was crowned by Pope Pius IX (1854) and Pius X (1904).

Pope Pius IX on 8 December 1854 issued the apostolic constitution Ineffabilis Deus:

"The most Blessed Virgin Mary, in the first instant of her conception, by a singular grace and privilege granted by almighty God, in view of the merits of Jesus Christ, the saviour of the human race, was preserved free from all stain of original sin."

According to the Universal Norms on the Liturgical Year and the Calendar, the solemnity of the Immaculate Conception cannot replace a Sunday in Advent; if 8 December falls on a Sunday, the solemnity is transferred to the next day, Monday, 9 December. The 1960 Code of Rubrics, still observed by some Traditionalist Catholics in accordance with Summorum Pontificum, allows the feast of the Immaculate Conception to supersede the Sunday in Advent.

When the feast is celebrated on 9 December, the obligation to attend Mass was not transferred in some countries, but in 2024 the Holy See issued a clarification that the obligation is transferred to the day when it is observed.

== Anglican Communion ==
In the Church of England, the "Conception of the Blessed Virgin Mary" may be observed as a Lesser Festival on 8 December without the religious designation as "sinless", "most pure" or "immaculate".

The situation in other constituent churches of the Anglican Communion is similar, i.e., as a lesser commemoration.

== Oriental Orthodoxy ==
The Ethiopian Orthodox Tewahedo Church celebrates the Feast of the Immaculate Conception on Nehasie 7 (August 13). The 96th chapter of the Kebra Nagast states: "He cleansed Eve's body and sanctified it and made for it a dwelling in her for Adam's salvation. Mary was born without blemish, for He made Her pure, without pollution".

== Eastern Orthodoxy ==
The Eastern Orthodox Churches does not accept the Catholic dogma of the Immaculate Conception. Accordingly, they celebrate 9 December called the “Feast of the Conception by Saint Anne of the Most Holy Theotokos”.

While the Orthodox believe that the Virgin Mary was, from her conception, filled with every grace of the Holy Spirit, in view of her calling as the Mother of God, they do not teach that she was conceived without original sin as their understanding and terminology of the doctrine of original sin differs from the Catholic articulation. The Orthodox do, however, affirm that Mary is "all-holy" and never committed a personal sin during her lifetime.

The Orthodox feast is not a perfect nine months before the feast of the Nativity of the Theotokos (8 September) as it is in the West, but a day later. This feast is not ranked among the Great Feasts of the church year, but is a lesser-ranking feast (Polyeleos).

== Designation as public holiday ==
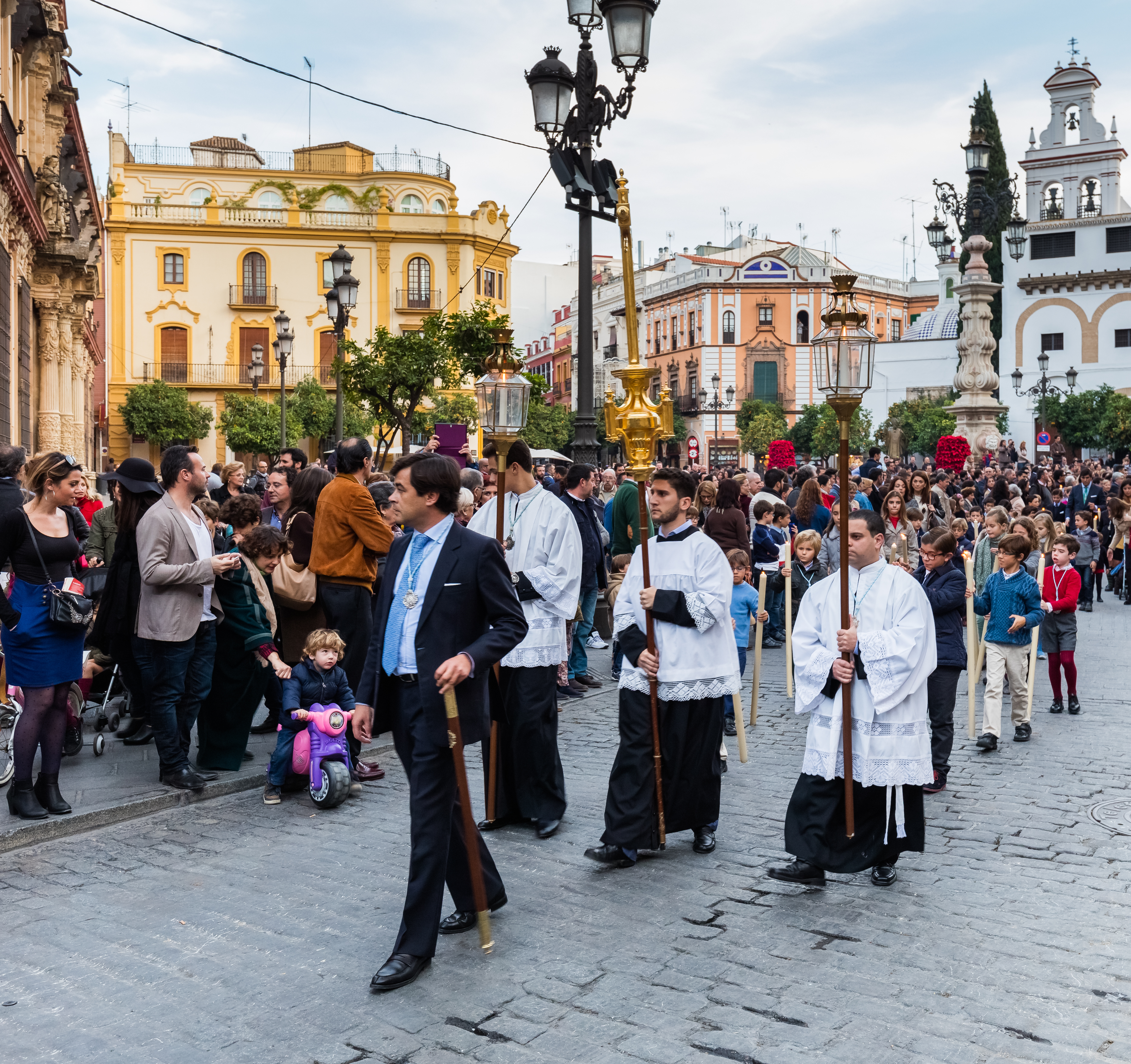
Immaculate procession in Seville, Spain

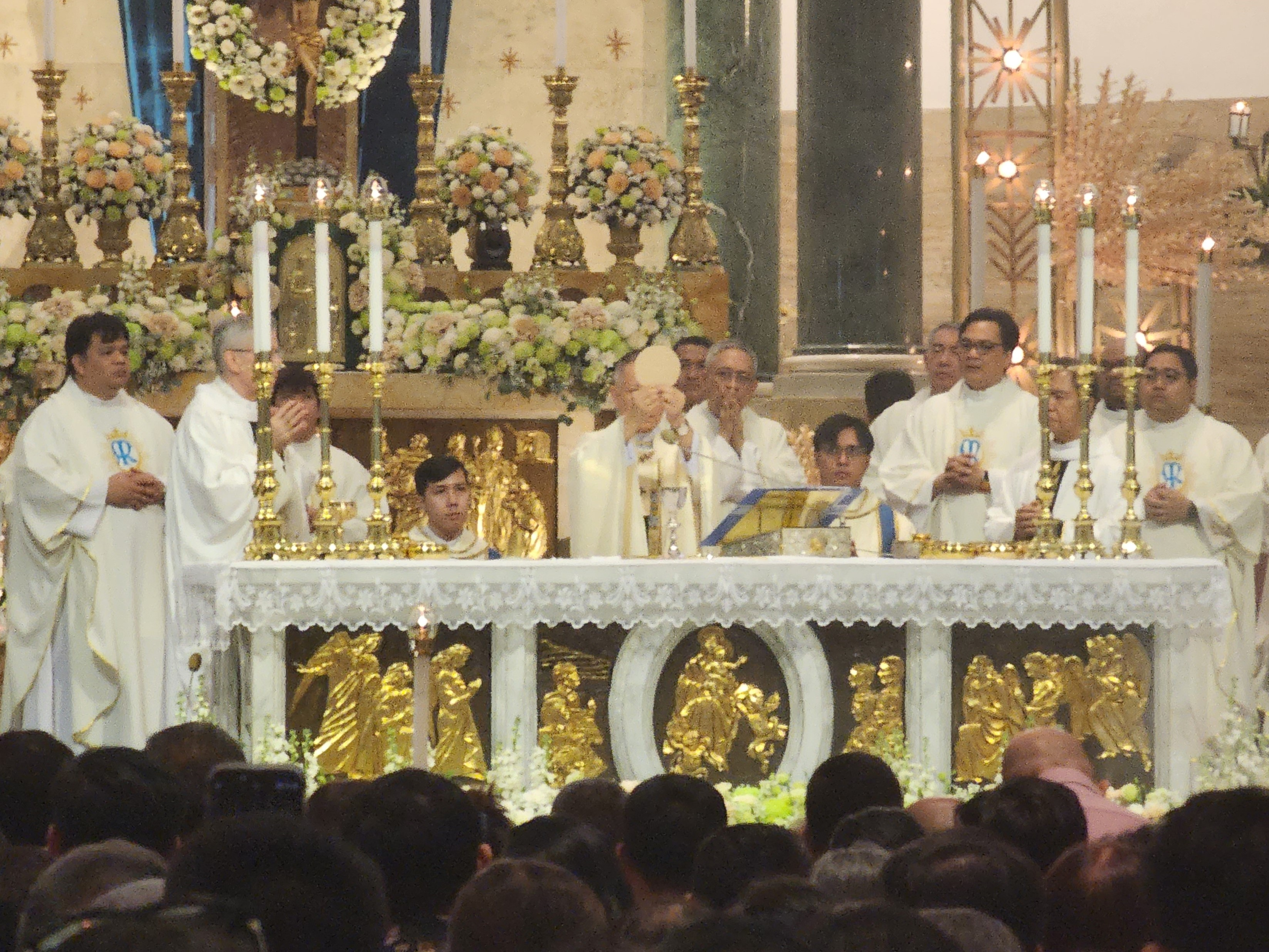
Mass at Manila Cathedral, dedicated to the Immaculate Conception, in Manila, Philippines, on 8 December 2023

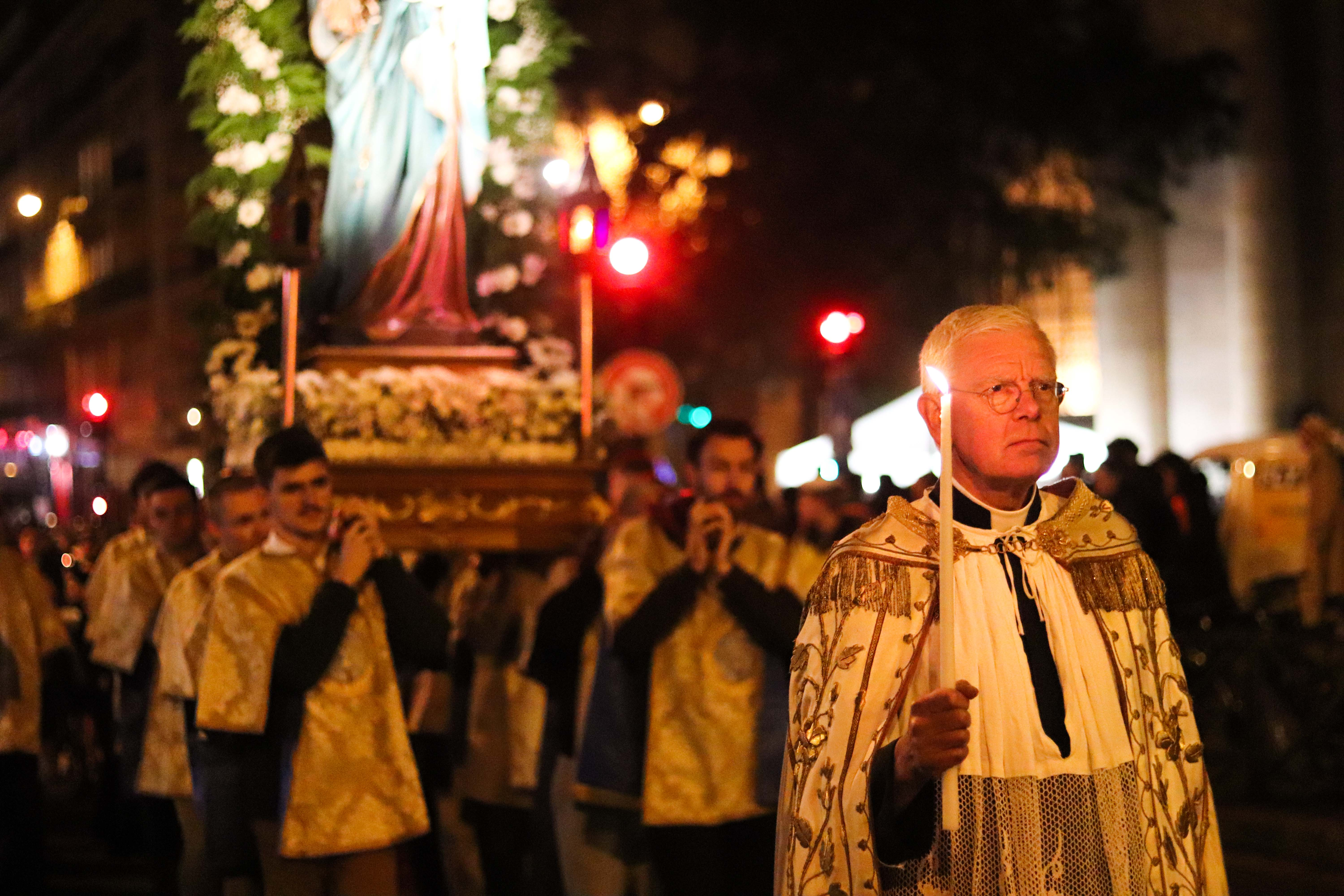
Procession of the Immaculate Conception of the Blessed Virgin Mary organized by Saint-Nicolas-du-Chardonnet, a church in central Paris, France, on 8 December 2023

The solemnity is a registered public holiday in the following sovereign countries and territories:

- Andorra
- Argentina
- Austria
- Chile
- Colombia — its people cook food and delicacies honoring this day.
- Equatorial Guinea
- Guam (USA) — celebrates Mary under the title of Our Lady of Camarin, the island’s patroness.
- Italy — it has been a national holiday since 1853. The Pope, as Bishop of Rome, visits the Column of the Immaculate Conception in Piazza di Spagna to offer expiatory prayers and flowers. The day marks the start of the Christmas season in the country.
- Liechtenstein
- Macau, China — by Government Executive Order No. 60/2000, published on 29 September 2000, and legally enforced since 1 January 2001.
- Malta
- Monaco — it is celebrated with food festivities, and the day particularly honours mothers and grandmothers.
- Nicaragua – the solemnity is celebrated with local parades and religious processions.
- Panama – it is celebrated throughout the country as Mother's Day.
- Paraguay
- Peru
- Philippines – a non-working public holiday honouring the Immaculate Conception as Principal Patroness of the nation, signed into law on 28 December 2017. Grand processions of various Marian images and feasting are common.
- Portugal
- San Marino
- Seychelles
- Spain — since 8 November 1760, the day is marked as a national holiday as designated by Pope Clement XIII.
- Switzerland — at present, 13 out of 26 cantons have elected to make this is a registered public holiday in accordance with government laws.
- (Timor-Leste) East Timor
- (Vatican City) Vatican
- Venezuela

== Iglesia de la Compañía Fire ==
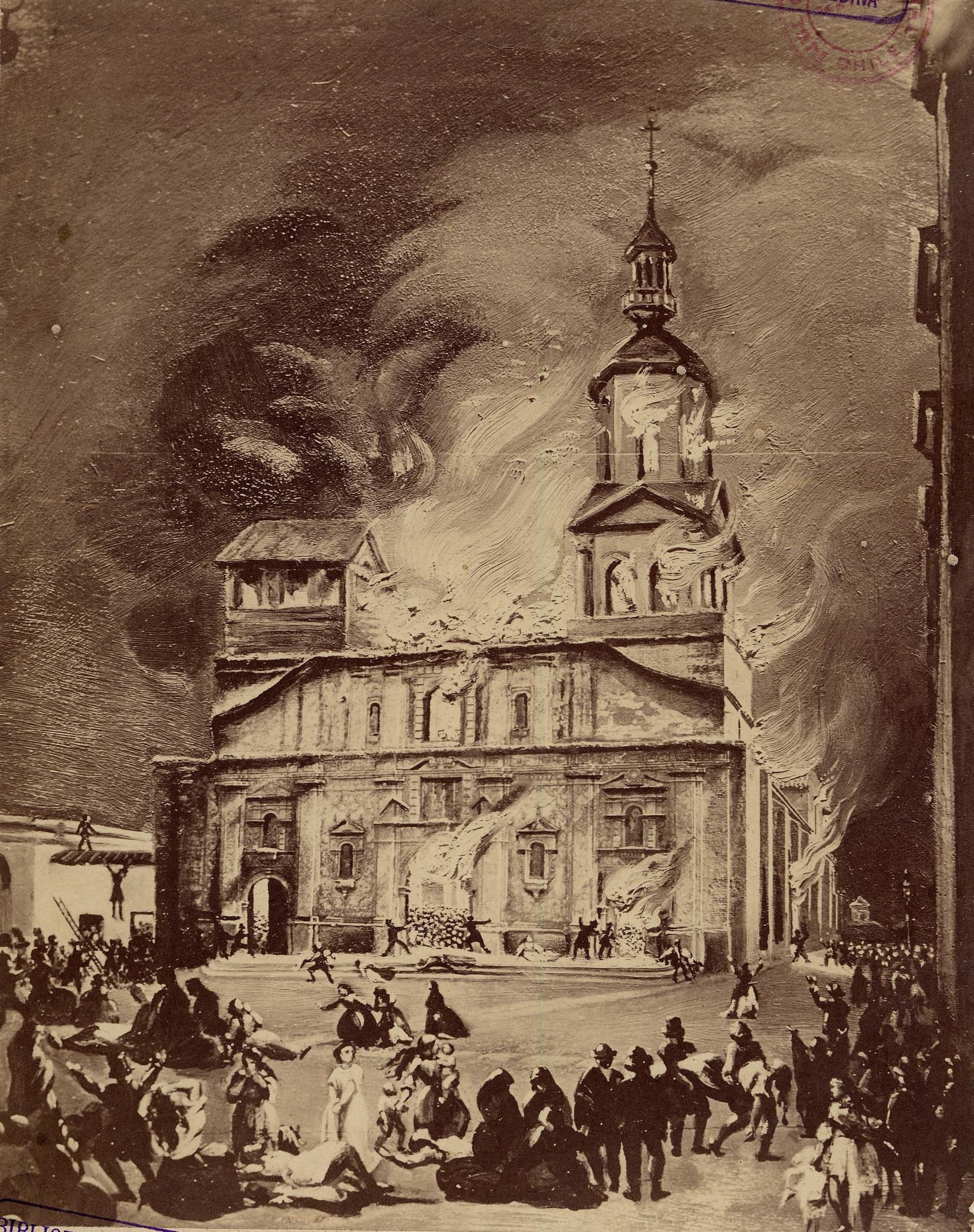
Iglesia de la Compañía Fire

The Iglesia de la Compañía Fire is a major mass casualty incident that occurred during the celebration of the Feast of the Immaculate Conception in Santiago, Chile; on December 8, 1863. A fire broke out at the start of a Mass that was being held at the Church of the Society of Jesus in honour of this feast day. Between 2,000 and 3,000 churchgoers (mostly women) were killed during the fire, a number which represented approximately 2% of the total population of Santiago at the time according to subsequent estimates. A combination of organisational negligence, overcrowding, mass panic and a highly flammable indoor environment led to a rapidly spreading fire that consumed the church within one hour. Only a relatively small number of people were able to escape. This tragedy is considered one of the largest single building fires by number of victims in the world.

== See also ==
- Feast of the Conception of the Virgin Mary (antecedent)
- Patronages of the Immaculate Conception
- Church of the Company Fire (A mass casualty tragedy which occurred on 8 December 1863, during the celebration of the Feast of the Immaculate Conception in Santiago, Chile; with more than 2,000 lives lost)
