= Molave =

Molave may refer to:

== Plants ==
- Vitex parviflora, a species of the molave tree
- Vitex cofassus, another species of molave tree also known as the New Guinea teak

== Places ==
- Molave, Zamboanga del Sur, a municipality in the Philippines

== Storms ==
- Typhoon Molave (2009) (T0906, 07W, Isang)
- Tropical Storm Molave (2015) (T1514, 15W)
- Typhoon Molave (2020) (T2018, 21W, Quinta) - a powerful typhoon that totally devastated the Southern Luzon area of the Philippines and Vietnam in late October 2020
