= Prado, Spain =

Prado
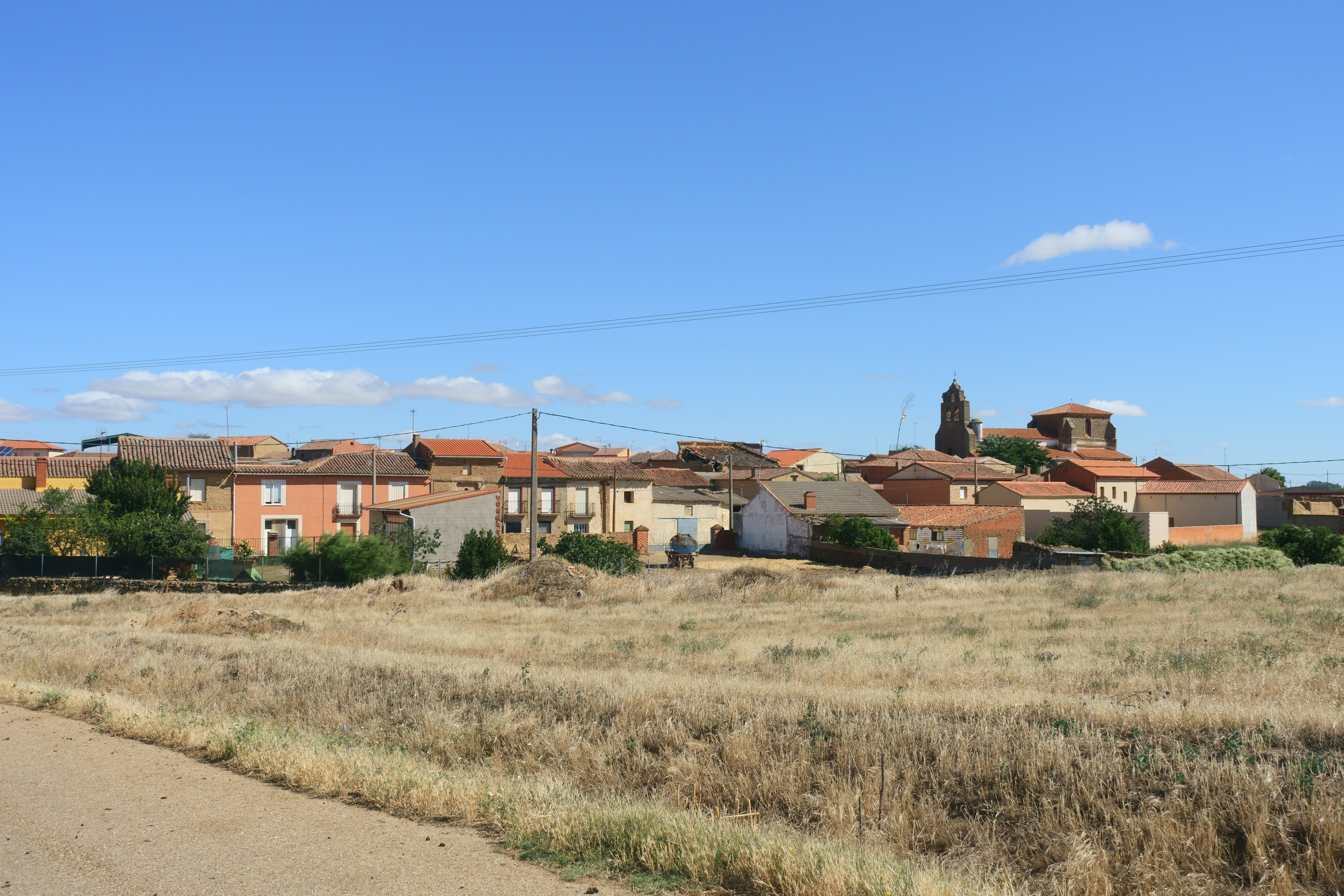

- Location in Spain.
- Country: Spain
- Autonomous community: Castile and León
- Province: Zamora
- Comarca: La Guareña

Government
  - Mayor: Liborio Conde Palmero

Area
  - Total: 10.95 km^{2} (4.23 sq mi)

Population (2025-01-01)
  - Total: 53
  - Density: 4.8/km^{2} (13/sq mi)
- Time zone: UTC+1 (CET)
  - Summer (DST): UTC+2 (CEST)

Prado is a Spanish municipality in the province of Zamora, autonomous community of Castile and León. Its area is 10.95 km^{2}, and it had a population of 99 in 2004.
