= John Calvin's views on Mary =

Protestant theologian's perspective on the mother of Jesus Christ

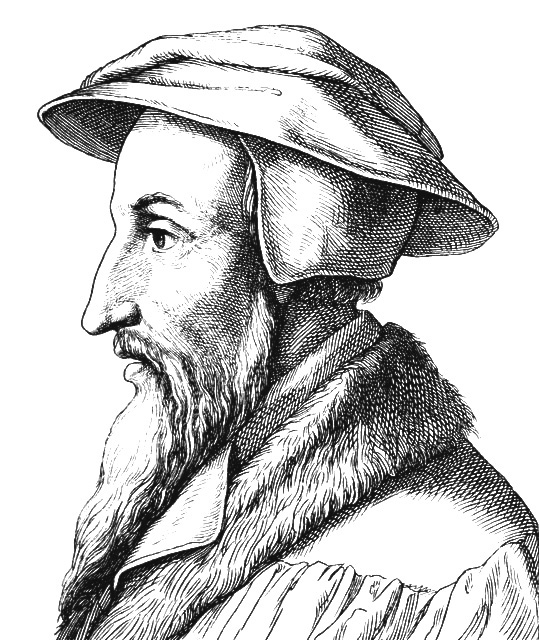
Portrait of John Calvin, 1854.

John Calvin (1509–1564) was a French Protestant theologian during the Protestant Reformation, and one of the most influential reformers. He was a central figure for the Reformed churches, whose theological system is sometimes called Calvinism.

Calvin had a positive view of Mary, but rejected the Roman Catholic veneration of her.

== Marian doctrines ==
Will Durant says that "[i]t is remarkable, how much of Roman Catholic tradition and theory survived in Calvin's theology." Calvin's genius was not in creating new ideas but in developing existing thought to its logical conclusion. He borrowed from Martin Luther, Huldrych Zwingli, Bucer, "but most of these Protestant doctrines had come down, in milder form, in Catholic tradition." Calvin gave them stronger interpretation and rejected Catholic humanism.

The criticism of Calvin on the Catholic Church in general, and in regard to Mary in particular, is severe. As in the conflicts with Luther and Zwingli, equally severe Catholic counter-attacks led later theologians to the observation that Mary was used by both sides to define theological positions and identity.

To Calvin, Mary is an idol in the Roman Church, and she diminishes the centrality and importance of Jesus. Regarding Marian relics, Calvin commented ironically that since the Roman Catholics believed in the Assumption of Mary, they have been deprived "of all pretext for manufacturing any relics of her remains, which otherwise might have been sufficiently abundant to fill a whole churchyard."

=== Perpetual virginity ===
Calvin argues that in Matthew 1:25 ("[Joseph] knew her [Mary] not till she had brought forth her firstborn son") the term "firstborn" and the conjunction "till" do not contradict the doctrine of perpetual virginity, but Matthew does not tell us what happened to Mary afterwards; he wrote: "no just and well-grounded inference can be drawn from these words of the Evangelist (Matthew), as to what took place after the birth of Christ."

At the same time, Calvin argues that the claims that Mary took a vow of perpetual virginity in Luke 1:34 ("How shall this be, since I know not a man?") is "unfounded and altogether absurd," and moreover he says that, had she taken such a vow, "[s]he would, in that case, have committed treachery by allowing herself to be united to a husband, and would have poured contempt on the holy covenant of marriage...." Although Algermissen suggests that Calvin believed that Mary in this verse looked into the future and recognized, that in light of this special grace, any contact with a man would be excluded for her, this interpretation takes an objection Calvin is refuting in his commentary and makes it his own position.

=== Mother of God ===
Calvin believed that Mary was, theologically speaking, rightly qualified as "the mother of God". In his letter of 27 September 1552 to the French Church in London, where some had denied this, he answered: "there may have been somewhat of ignorance in their reproving the way of speaking of the Virgin Mary as the mother of God, and together with ignorance, it is possible that there may have been rashness and too much forwardness, for, as the old proverb says, The most ignorant are ever the boldest."

But in the same letter Calvin rejected the use of "mother of God" as common title which could be used to designate Mary in any sermons. He wrote: "I cannot think such language either right, or becoming, or suitable. ... To call the Virgin Mary the mother of God can only serve to confirm the ignorant in their superstitions."

Calvin's view on this subject can also be found in Calvin's commentary on Luke 1:43 for support. In this verse, in which Elizabeth greeted Mary as "mother of my Lord," Calvin takes note of the divinity often associated with the title Lord, saying: "[Elizabeth] calls Mary the mother of her Lord. This denotes a unity of person in the two natures of Christ; as if she had said, that he who was begotten a mortal man in the womb of Mary is, at the same time, the eternal God.... This name Lord strictly belongs to the Son of God 'manifested in the flesh,' (1 Timothy 3:16,) who has received from the Father all power, and has been appointed the highest ruler of heaven and earth, that by his agency God may govern all things." Proponents of this view of Calvin's mariology point out that Calvin's objection to the title "mother of God" had to do with the "superstition" of the "ignorant," presumably a reference to Marian veneration. He does not state that Mary cannot in any sense be called the "mother of God."

Opponents of this view state that Calvin's comments on Mary as the mother of Elizabeth's Lord may be understood to mean that, in Calvin's view, Mary was mother of the Lord only while he was on earth. Proponents of this view have cited Calvin's commentary on John 19:26, from which it has been argued that Calvin considered the mother-son relationship between Mary and Jesus to have ceased at Jesus' death. In this scheme, Christ, as he was dying on the cross, appointed his disciple John to take his place as Mary's son, so that he himself might henceforth take his rightful place at the Father's right hand in heaven. Upon Christ's words to his mother concerning John, "Woman, behold thy son!" Calvin comments, "Some think that He does not call her 'mother' but only 'woman' so as not to inflict a deeper wound of sorrow on her heart. I do not reject this; but another conjecture is no less probable, that Christ wanted to show that now that He has completed the course of human life, He puts off the condition in which He has lived and enters into the heavenly kingdom where He will rule over angels and men. For we know that Christ's custom always was to recall believers from looking at the flesh. This was especially necessary at His death."

=== Immaculate Conception ===
John Calvin believed in the doctrine of original sin as well as the doctrine of headship, found in Romans 5:12-21. Considering he believed in both of these doctrines most reformed theologians agree that John Calvin did not accept the doctrine of Immaculate Conception, considering it conflicted with the aforementioned doctrines and with Romans 3:23 that all have sinned.

Taking into account Calvin's belief in headship, this means that Mary could have original sin and not pass it on to Jesus, considering the male is the one who passes on original sin in the doctrine of headship. Since Jesus was conceived by God himself and not by a human man, original sin was not passed on. Said Calvin: "We condemn those who affirm that a man once justified cannot sin. ... As to the special privilege of the Virgin Mary, when they produce the celestial diploma we shall believe what they say."

=== Salvation ===
Calvin's soteriology was grounded in the belief that Christ alone is sufficient for salvation. He regarded any opposition to this doctrine as "pure defiance", and consequently denied any notion of Mary as a participant in the mystery of salvation. He rejected the Roman Catholic belief that Mary acts as a mediator between man and God as idolatry, since only Christ can fulfill this role. Calvin forbade prayers and supplications to Mary for the same reason, further arguing that praying to the dead is not a practice supported by Scripture.

Calvin held that God's salvation or damnation of an individual seals his fate eternally, rejecting the concept of eventual salvation through suffering in purgatory. He regarded the Catholic belief that Mary can intercede on behalf of the dead to be "nothing but blasphemy" ("exsecrabilis blasphemia"), on the basis that only God has the authority to determine the amount of grace given to each individual in his divine will. He therefore did not condone praying to Mary for the salvation of dead sinners, as their eternal fate was already sealed long before creation.

=== Fullness of grace ===
The fullness of grace is therefore rejected as well, since the plenitude de grace is Christ only. On this point he coincides with Roman Catholic teaching, which sees only in Christ absolute fullness of grace, while the graces of Mary are seen as a gift of God attributed to her. She indeed is the Virgin Mary, Mother of God, Theotokos! On the other hand, Calvin called Mary a treasure of grace, because, Mary preserved in her heart not only for her own use but for the use of all things entrusted to her. She preserved things in her heart, not just for herself, but for all of us. "She has preserved in her heart the teachings which open the heavenly gates and lead to Christ". God wanted to determine the time in which they would be revealed.

=== Advocate ===
Calvin considered himself a real follower of Mary, because he freed her from what he saw as undeserved honour. Calvin stated that Mary cannot be the advocate of the faithful since she needs God's grace as much as any other human being.

== Veneration of Mary ==
Calvin had genuine respect for Mary and saw her as a model for faith. "To this day we cannot enjoy the blessing brought to us in Christ without thinking at the same time of that which God gave as adornment and honour to Mary, in willing her to be the mother of his only-begotten Son". The genuine respect for Mary in Calvin's writing, and his attempt to express his Marian convictions to the faithful of his day in his explanations of the epistles is not fully known or shared by Reformed Protestants after John Calvin.

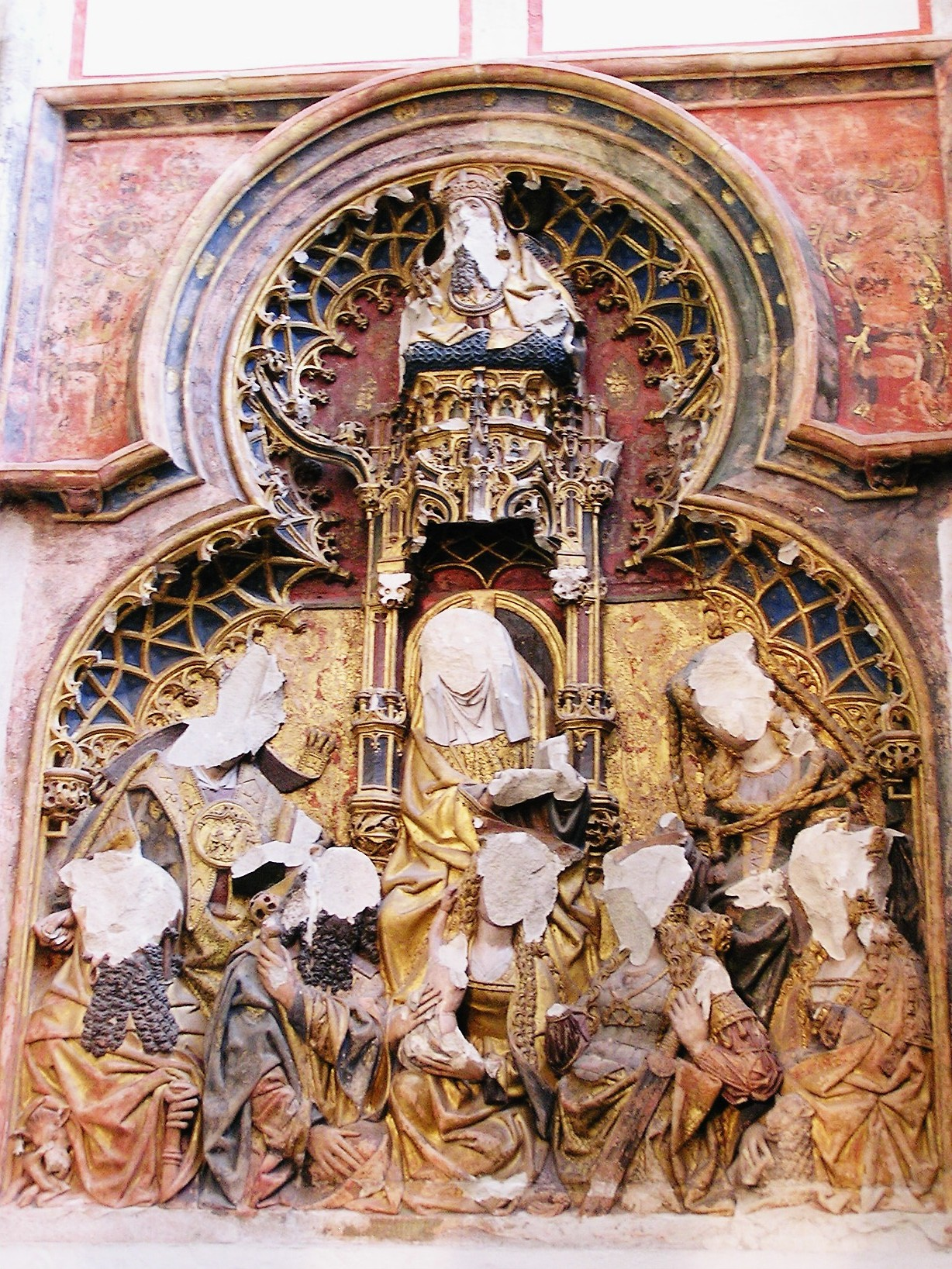
Statues in the Cathedral of Saint Martin, Utrecht, attacked in Reformation iconoclasm in the 16th century

=== Iconoclasm ===
Some of the Protestant reformers, Andreas Karlstadt, Huldrych Zwingli and John Calvin encouraged the removal of religious images by invoking the Decalogue's prohibition of idolatry and the manufacture of graven images of God. As a result, statues and images were damaged in spontaneous individual attacks as well as unauthorised iconoclastic riots. Erasmus described such an incident in a letter:

- They heaped such insults on the images of the saints, and the crucifix itself, that it is quite surprising there was no miracle. ... Not a statue was left either in the churches, or the vestibules, or the porches, or the monasteries. The frescoes were obliterated by means of a coating of lime; whatever would burn was thrown into the fire, and the rest pounded into fragments. Nothing was spared for either love or money.

The destruction of Marian paintings and painting of the saints was not ordered by Calvin alone. But, virtually all Marian pictures and statues in Geneva were destroyed as a result of his 1535 order. John Calvin considered the veneration of religious pictures including Marian pictures as heresy. The Second Council of Nicaea, which in the year 787 had specifically encouraged the pictorial presentation, and which was a part of the ancient Christian patristic tradition, was renounced as illegal by Calvin in 1550.

== Calvin's influence ==
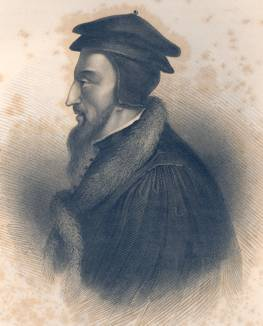
John Calvin's views on Mary are reflected in the Second Helvetic Confession (Latin: Confessio Helvetica Posterior)

Calvin's views on Mary are reflected in the Second Helvetic Confession, written by Heinrich Bullinger (1504–1575), pastor and the successor of Huldrych Zwingli in Zurich. Chapter Three quotes the angel's message to the Virgin Mary, “ – the Holy Spirit will come over you “ – as an indication of the existence of the Holy Spirit and the Trinity. The Latin text described Mary as diva, indicating her rank as a person, who dedicated herself to God. In Chapter Nine, the Virgin birth of Jesus is said to be conceived by the Holy Spirit and born without the participation of any man. The Second Helvetic Confession accepted the "Ever Virgin" notion, which spread throughout much of Europe with the approbation of this document.

The French, Scots, and Belgic Confessions, as well as the Heidelberg Catechism, all include references to the Virgin Birth, mentioning specifically, that Jesus was born without the participation of a man. Invocations to Mary were not tolerated however, in light of Calvin's position, that any prayer to saints in front of an altar is prohibited.

== See also ==
- Luther's Marian theology
- Blessed Virgin Mary
- Mary (mother of Jesus)
- Theotokos
- History of Roman Catholic Mariology
- Mariology

== Sources ==
- Konrad Algermissen, John Calvin, in Marienlehre, Regensburg, 1967
- Konrad Algermissen, John Calvin, in Marienlexikon, Regensburg, 1988 (quoted as Algermissen 1988)
- John Calvin, Calvini Opera Omnia Braunschweig-Berlin, 1863–1900, Vol 29–87
- Will Durant, The Reformation, The Story of Civilization: Part VI, Simon and Schuster, New York, 1957
- Jaroslav Pelikan, Mary Through The Ages, New Haven, Connecticut: Yale University Press, 1996, referencing Walter Tappolet, ed., Das Marienlob der Reformatoren Tübingen: Katzman Verlag, 1962
- David Wright (editor), Chosen By God: Mary in Evangelical Perspective, London, England: Marshall Pickering, 1989
