= Anglican Mariology =

Summation of the doctrines and beliefs of Anglicanism concerning Mary, mother of Jesus

Anglican Marian theology is the summation of the doctrines and beliefs of Anglicanism concerning Mary, the mother of Jesus. As Anglicans believe that Jesus was both human and God the Son, the second Person of the Trinity, within the Anglican Communion and Continuing Anglican movement, Mary is accorded honour as the theotokos, a Koiné Greek term that means "God-bearer" or "one who gives birth to God".

Anglicans of evangelical or low church tradition tend to avoid honouring Mary. Other Anglicans respect and honour Mary because of the special religious significance that she has within Christianity as the mother of Jesus Christ. This honour and respect is termed veneration.

Mary always held a place of honour within the English Church, but many of the doctrines surrounding her have been called into question over the centuries, most as the result of the Reformation. While Protestantism generally is based upon interpretation of scripture by a variety of 16th century reformers, who mostly rejected the practice of speaking directly to Mary and other saints (except in certain hymns, e.g. Ye Watchers and Ye Holy Ones, canticles, e.g. the Benedicite, and Psalms, e.g. Psalm 148), certain Anglican traditions, especially after the Oxford Movement, have allowed for Mary and the saints to be addressed.

== History ==
=== Pre-Reformation England ===
In the 12th-century legends surrounding King Lucius, the apostles Fagan and Duvian were said to have erected the St Mary's at Glastonbury as the oldest church in Britain in the mid-2nd century. Later accounts pushed its origin still farther back and credited its foundation to a visit by Joseph of Arimathea in AD 65. (There are some debatable rumours that elements may have been pious forgeries.)

The British church generally preferred to dedicate parish churches to local saints credited with founding the llan and introducing Christianity to the area. Replacing these native foundations with more generic dedications to St Peter, St Paul, and the Virgin Mary was a common aspect of the Saxon and Norman invasions, in some cases leading to oddities like the village near Cardiff still known as St Fagans despite having had a parish church dedicated to St Mary, the Blessed Virgin, since the 12th century. By the High Middle Ages, Marian piety was so widespread throughout the country that England had become known as the Dowry of Mary. England was the first country to celebrate the Feast of the Assumption, in 1060.

Many of the great English saints were devoted to Mary and wrote prayers about her. The Carmelite Saint Simon Stock is said to have received the Brown Scapular from her in the city of Cambridge on Sunday, July 16, 1251. Saint Edmund of Canterbury wrote many prayers addressed to her. Saint Richard of Chichester and Saint Thomas Becket were also especially devoted to Mary, but the English saint best known for his devotion was Saint Anselm of Canterbury, who wrote many prayers and books about and dedicated to "the spotless Ever-Virgin Mother of Christ".

=== English Reformation ===
One aspect of the English Reformation was a widespread reaction against Mary as a mediatrix alongside Christ, or sometimes even in his place. Such exaggerated devotions, in part inspired by presentations of Christ as an inaccessible Judge as well as Redeemer, were criticized by Erasmus and Thomas More and rejected by the Church of England. Together with a new emphasis on Scripture as the fundamental standard of faith, there was a renewed devotion by the Reformers to the belief that Jesus Christ is the only mediator between God the Father and humanity. This rejected any overt devotion to Mary and diminished her place in the life of the Church.

The English Reformers' positive teaching about Mary concentrated on her role in the Incarnation. It is summed up in their acceptance of her as the Mother of God, because this was seen to be both scriptural and traditional. As did the Early Church, almost all prominent Protestant reformers like Martin Luther and John Calvin affirmed their belief in the perpetual virginity of Mary, English Reformers such as Hugh Latimer, Thomas Cranmer, and John Jewel too believed in the dogma. They neither affirmed nor denied the possibility of Mary having been preserved by grace from participation in original sin. The Book of Common Prayer in the Christmas collect and preface refers to Mary as "a pure Virgin".

From 1561, the calendar of the Church of England contained five feasts associated with Mary: The Conception of Mary, Nativity of Mary, Annunciation, Visitation, and Purification. There was, however, no longer a feast of the Assumption (Dormition) [August 15]: not only was it not found in the Bible, but was also seen as exalting Mary to a level above Christ. Scottish and Canadian revisions of the Prayer Book restored August 15 as the Falling Asleep of the Blessed Virgin Mary.

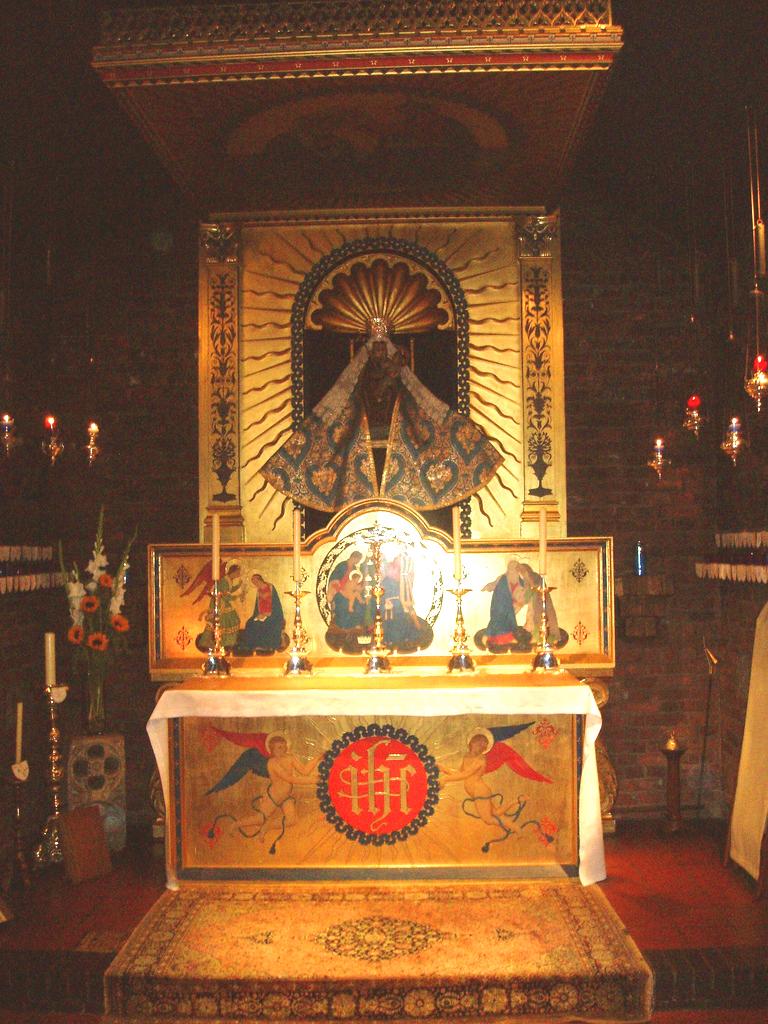
The Holy House in the Anglican Shrine of Our Lady of Walsingham.

Despite the lack of official devotion to Mary, starting in the 16th century, reverence for her continued in the use of the Magnificat in Evening Prayer, and the naming and dedication of churches and Lady Chapels. In the 17th century writers such as Lancelot Andrewes, Jeremy Taylor, Thomas Traherne and Thomas Ken took from catholic tradition a fuller appreciation of the place of Mary in the prayers of the Church. Andrewes in his Preces Privatae borrowed from Eastern liturgies to deepen his Marian devotion.

The Cambridge theologian John Pearson, who was made Bishop of Chester in 1672, in his celebrated book An Exposition of the Creed affirmed both the Immaculate Conception and the perpetual virginity of Mary, writing, "We believe the Mother of our Lord to have been not only before and after his Nativity, but also for ever, the most immaculate and blessed Virgin." Pearson explicated the basis for a proper Marian devotion:

If Elizabeth cried out with so loud a voice, 'Blessed art thou among women,' when Christ was but newly conceived in Mary's womb, what expressions of honour and admiration can we think sufficient now that Christ is in heaven and that Mother with Him! Far be it from any Christian to derogate from that special privlilege granted her which is incommunicable to any other. We cannot bear too reverent a regard unto the Mother of our Lord, so long as we give her not that worship which is due unto the Lord Himself. Let us keep the language of the Primitive Church: Let her be honoured and esteemed, let him be worshiped and adored.

This re-appropriation can be traced into the next century, and into the Oxford Movement of the 19th century.

In 1922 the creation of a new statue of Our Lady of Walsingham under the aegis of Father Hope Patten, reignited Anglican interest in a revival of the pre-Reformation pilgrimage. From the early 1930s Walsingham became a centre of Anglican as well as Catholic Marian pilgrimage. This developed into the Anglican Shrine of Our Lady of Walsingham in 1938.

== Present theology ==
Mary has a new prominence in Anglicanism through the liturgical renewals of the 20th century. In most Anglican prayer books, Mary is again mentioned by name in the liturgical prayers. Further, August 15 has come to be widely celebrated as a feast or festival in honour of Saint Mary the Virgin with Scripture readings, collect, and proper preface. Other ancient feasts associated with Mary have also been renewed, and liturgical resources offered for use on these festivals. Marian devotions such as the Rosary, Angelus, and Regina Coeli are most commonly associated with the Anglo-Catholic and High Church churchmanships within Anglicanism.

An Anglo-Catholic manual, Saint Augustine's Prayer Book: A Book of Devotion for members of the Episcopal Church, first published in 1947, includes a section containing devotions to the Blessed Virgin Mary. This includes the Rosary, the four seasonal Marian antiphons, the Memorare, and litanies of the Blessed Virgin and Our Lady of Sorrows. A Revised Edition was published in 1967, and the book remains in print with Holy Cross Publications. The Anglo-Catholic Prayer book, a classic, was published in an entirely new edition in 2000, and it also includes a section of prayers to the Blessed Virgin, including to her Immaculate Conception and Assumption.

Anglican theologian Hugh Montefiore, former Bishop of Birmingham, while denying the immaculate conception and the bodily assumption of Mary into heaven, says "Christians rightly honour and venerate her as one of the great saints of God. God had signally honoured her by choosing her to be the mother of Jesus."

== English Lady Chapels ==
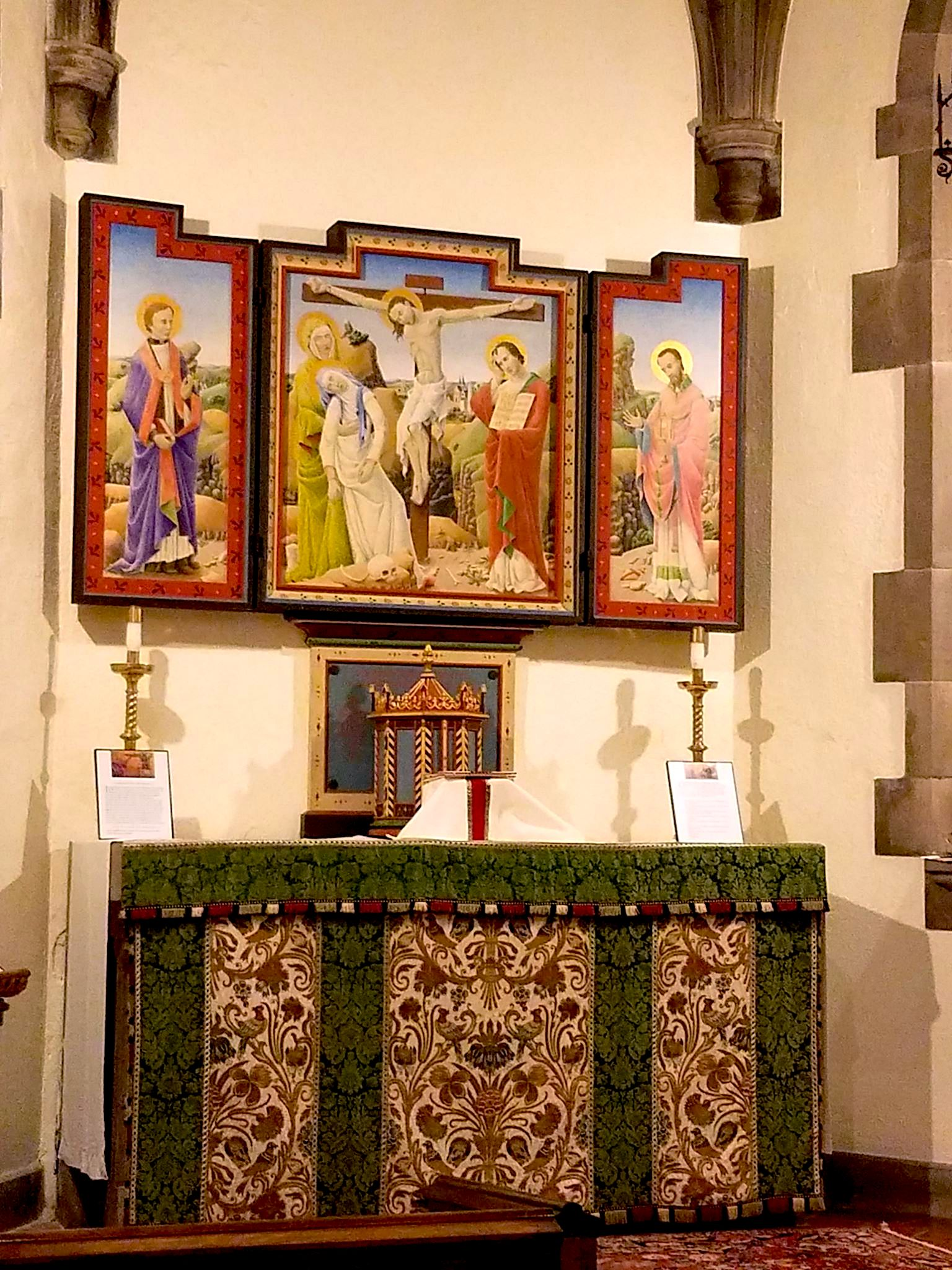
Lady Chapel, Anglo-Catholic Church of the Good Shepherd (Rosemont, Pennsylvania)

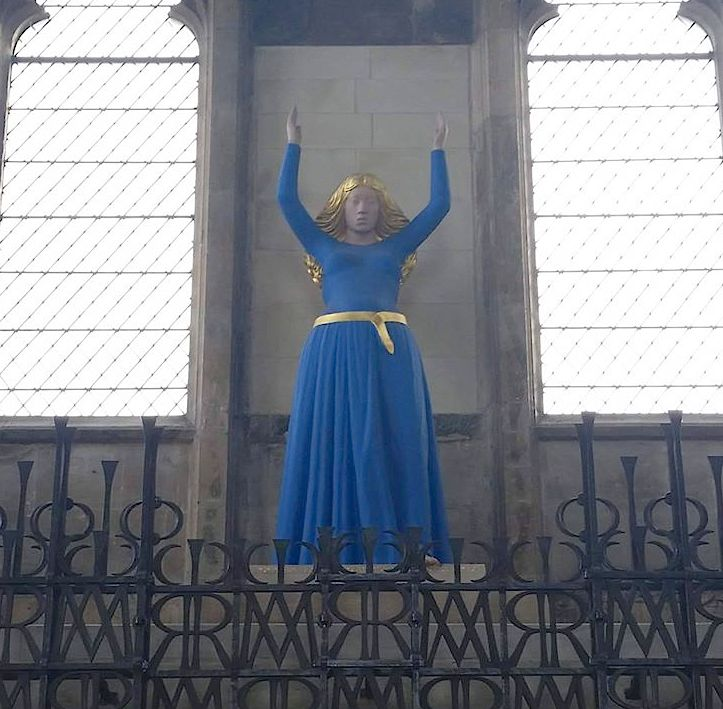
Virgin Mary at the Annunciation, Lady Chapel, Ely Cathedral

Some of the most famous chapels dedicated to Mary have been Lady chapels. Since the end of the 6th century Lady Chapels have existed in most English cathedrals, where they often form part of the apse. Traditionally, a Lady chapel is the largest chapel of a cathedral. Generally, the chapel was built east of the high altar and formed a projection from the main building.

The earliest Lady Chapel of certain historicity was that in the Anglo-Saxon cathedral at Canterbury. Unusually, at Ely the Lady Chapel is an almost separate building to the north of the Choir. The Lady Chapels at Norwich Wells Cathedral and Peterborough (in a similar position to Ely's) cathedrals were destroyed during the English Reformation.

Probably the most famous Lady-chapel was the Chapel of Our Lady of the Pew, built by Henry III in 1220 at Westminster Abbey. The Abbey also contains Henry VII's Lady Chapel.

== Joint Anglican-Roman Catholic document ==
To encourage ecumenical cooperation despite differences over other matters, the Roman Catholic and Anglican churches issued a joint statement, "Mary: Grace and Hope in Christ" (also known as the Seattle Statement) on the role of the Virgin Mary in Christianity. The document was released May 16, 2005 in Seattle, Washington, by Alexander Brunett, the local Catholic Archbishop, and Peter Carnley, Anglican Archbishop of Perth, Western Australia, co-chairmen of the Anglican-Roman Catholic International Commission (ARCIC).

Much has been made of the difference between the Mariology of Anglicans and that of Roman Catholics. Because Anglicanism does not have an official view about these doctrines, it can be difficult to say with precision what Anglicans believe. The description here attempts to sketch out the areas where Anglicans are in agreement that there is no official binding doctrine.

Roman Catholic Mariology contends that a veneration (hyperdulia) should be given to Mary that is higher than the dulia given to the other saints. Eastern Orthodox theology and practice endorses very similar views. Worship (latria) is properly given only to God. Anglicans agree that God alone is to be worshipped, additionally Mary is affirmed as the greatest of all the saints, and she should be venerated as such.

Anglicanism also does not accept the doctrines of the Assumption or the Immaculate Conception as binding, though some Anglicans consider these to be pious devotions. For example, the former Bishop of Chester, John Pearson, called Mary "a most pure immaculate Virgin". Even so, they are not held to the particular forms used by the Roman Catholic Church to define them. Many agree with the Eastern Orthodox rejection of the Immaculate Conception, while agreeing that Mary was without actual sin during her life. Many also are more in agreement with the Dormition of Mary as understood by the Orthodox.

== Calendars ==
=== Principal feasts ===
- Presentation of Christ in the Temple, also the "Purification of the Blessed Virgin Mary" or Candlemas, 2 February (Church of England, Church of Ireland)
- The Annunciation, 25 March (Church of England)

=== Festivals ===
- Visitation of the Blessed Virgin Mary – (31 May or 2 July)
- Saint Mary the Virgin, or the "Falling Asleep of the Blessed Virgin Mary" – (15 August)

Various names are used for the observance of 15 August in official Anglican liturgical calendars, but Anglo-Catholics will generally prefer to follow the broader Catholic tradition of calling this the feast of the Assumption. It is thus named in the Anglican Missal, Saint Augustine's Prayer Book, and A Manual of Catholic Devotion published by The Church Union.

=== Lesser festivals and commemorations ===
- The Nativity of the Blessed Virgin Mary – (8 September)
- The Conception of the Blessed Virgin Mary – (8 December)

The Society of Mary, an Anglican devotional society, asks that members keep a Rule of life which includes a pledge to "take part in the Mass on the principal Feasts of Our Lady".

== Summary ==
- Anglicans recognize the dogma upheld at the Council of Ephesus (431) and the Council of Chalcedon (451) that Mary is the Theotokos, the "God-Bearer". The reason Anglicans accept this statement is because it is primarily a Christological affirmation, affirming that Christ is God. The terms "Mother of God" and "God-Bearer," however, are not used in the official formularies of the Churches of the Anglican Communion, and some Anglicans would not wish to use these terms.
- Some Anglicans agree that the doctrine of the perpetual virginity of Mary is sound and logical, but without more scriptural proof it cannot be considered dogmatic.
- No Anglican denomination accepts belief in Mary as Co-Redemptrix and any interpretation of the role of Mary that obscures the unique mediation of Christ.
- Anglicans typically believe that all doctrines concerning Mary must be linked with the doctrines of Christ and the Church.
- Anglicans recognize Mary as an example of holiness, faith and obedience for all Christians; and that Mary can be seen as a prophetic figure of the Church. As the Gospel of Luke (1.48) states "henceforth all nations shall call me blessed," she is often considered to have a unique place of importance within the Communion of Saints
- Churches of the Anglican Communion observe at least some of the traditional Marian festivals of the ancient Catholic Church. The Church of England, for example, in the Calendar of its 1662 Book of Common Prayer includes The Annunciation of our Lady on March 25 as a festival to be observed. That Calendar includes as "black-letter days" the Conception, the Nativity, and the Visitation of the Blessed Virgin Mary, but does not observe them liturgically. Some later Prayer Books e.g., the 1991 Anglo-Catholic Anglican Service Book, do allow them to be so observed and may even publish certain Marian devotions, and most recent Anglican Prayer Books include St Mary the Mother of the Lord as a major festival on August 15.

== Gallery ==
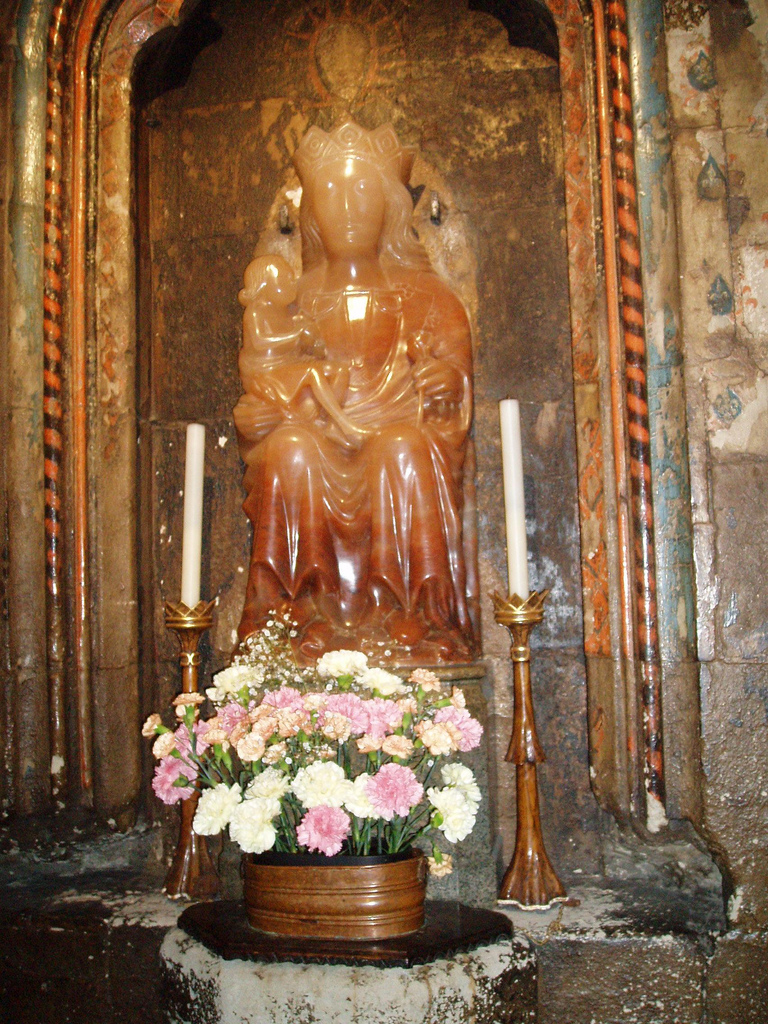
A copy of Our Lady of Westminster by Sister Concordia Scott enshrined as "Our Lady of Pew" in Westminster Abbey

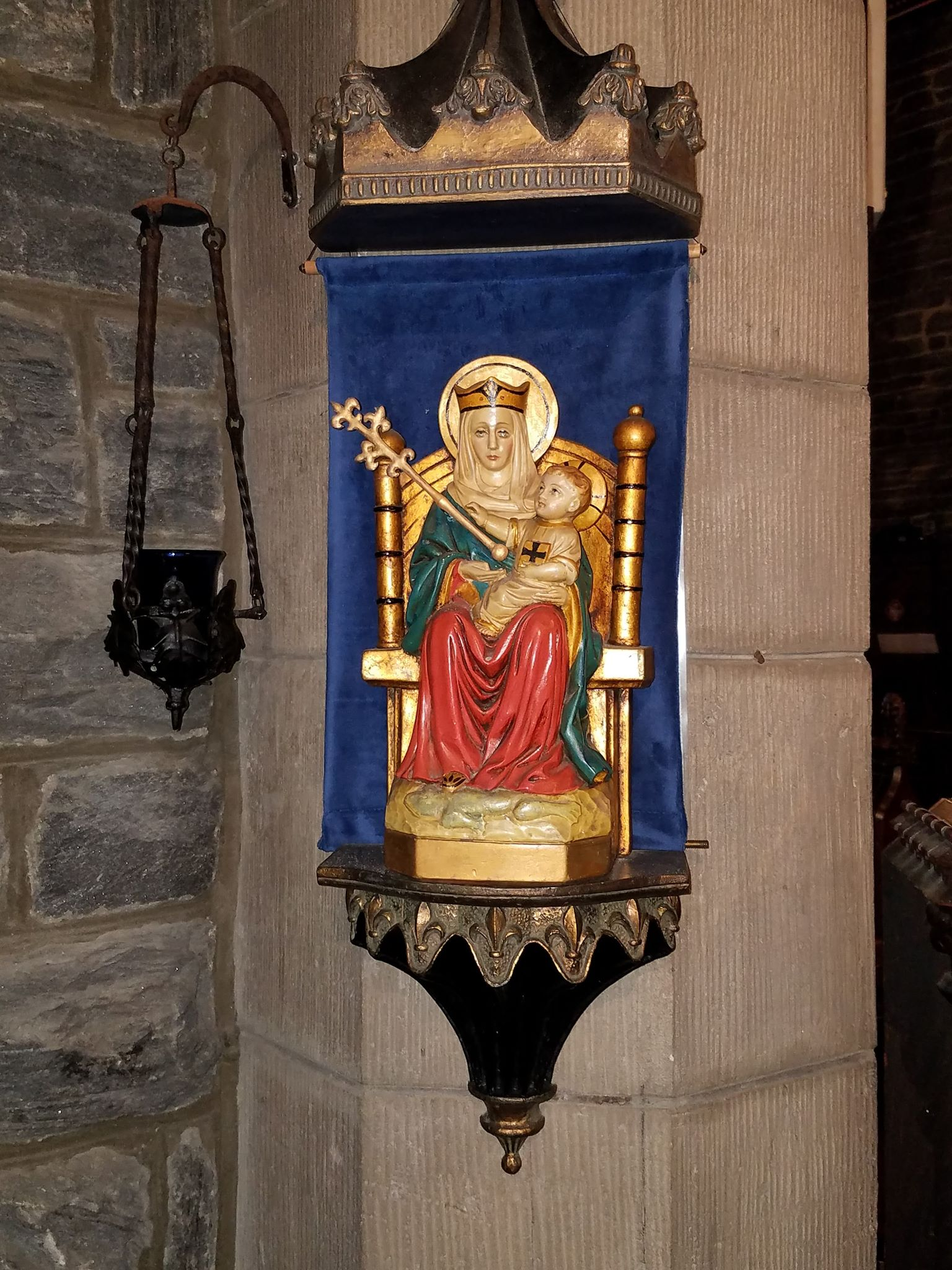
Our Lady of Walsingham shrine at Church of the Good Shepherd (Rosemont, Pennsylvania)

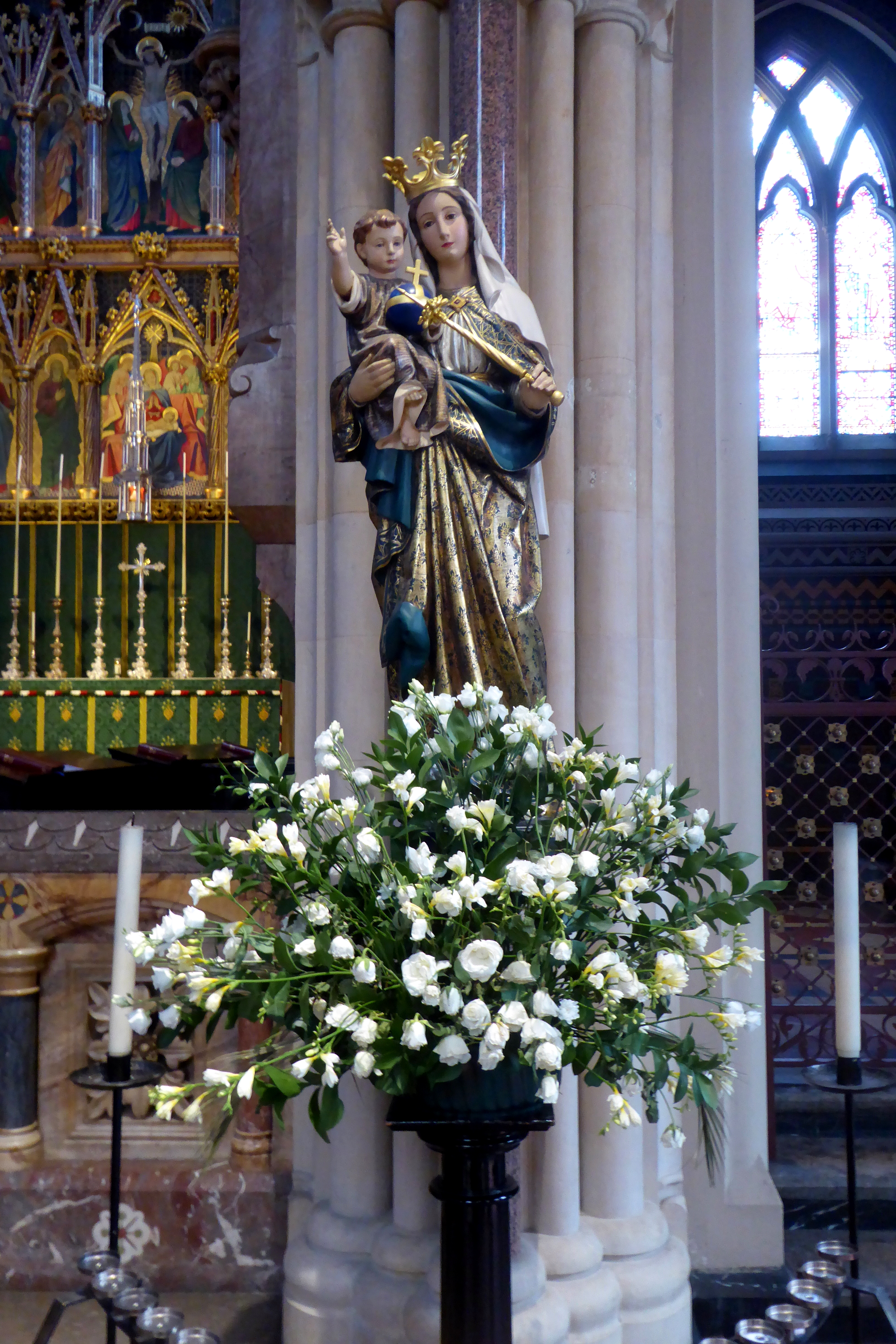
Virgin and Child statue at All Saints, Margaret Street

== See also ==
- Anglican Roman Catholic International Commission
- Blessed Virgin Mary (Roman Catholic)
- History of Roman Catholic Mariology
- Islamic view of Virgin Mary
- Marian devotions
- Marian doctrines of the Catholic Church
- Mariology
- Mary (mother of Jesus)
- Our Lady of Ipswich
- Our Lady of Walsingham
- Protestant views of Mary
- Society of Mary (Anglican)
- Theotokos
