= Mariology =

Christian theological study of Mary, mother of Jesus

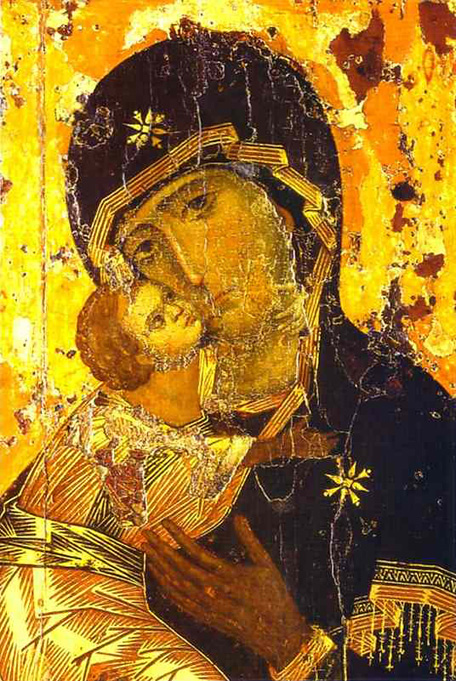
The Eleusa style such as this Vladimir icon of the Madonna with the Christ Child nestled against her face, has been depicted in both the Eastern and Western churches.

Mariology is the Christian theological study of Mary, mother of Jesus. Mariology seeks to relate doctrine or dogma about Mary to other doctrines of the faith, such as those concerning Jesus and notions about redemption, intercession and grace. Christian Mariology aims to place the role of the historic Mary in the context of scripture, tradition and the teachings of the Church on Mary. In terms of social history, Mariology may be broadly defined as the study of devotion to and thinking about Mary throughout the history of Christianity.

There exist a variety of Christian (and non-Christian) views on Mary as a figure ranging from the focus on the veneration of Mary in Roman Catholic Mariology to criticisms of "mariolatry" as a form of idolatry. The latter would include certain Protestant objections to Marian devotion. There are also more distinctive approaches to the role of Mary in Lutheran Mariology and Anglican Marian theology. As a field of theology, the most substantial developments in Mariology (and the founding of specific centers devoted to its study) in recent centuries have taken place within Roman Catholic Mariology. Eastern Orthodox concepts and veneration of Mary are integral to the rite as a whole, (the Theotokos) and are mostly expressed in liturgy. The veneration of Mary is said to permeate, in a way, the entire life of the Church as a "dimension" of dogma as well as piety, of Christology as well as of Ecclesiology. While similar to the Roman Catholic view, barring some minor differences, the Orthodox do not see a need for a separate academic discipline of Mariology, as the Mother of God is seen as the self-evident apogee of God's human creation.

A significant number of Marian publications were written in the 20th century, with theologians Raimondo Spiazzi and Gabriel Roschini producing 2500 and 900 publications respectively. The Pontifical Academy of Mary and the Pontifical Theological Faculty Marianum in Rome are key Mariological centers.

== Diversity of Marian views ==
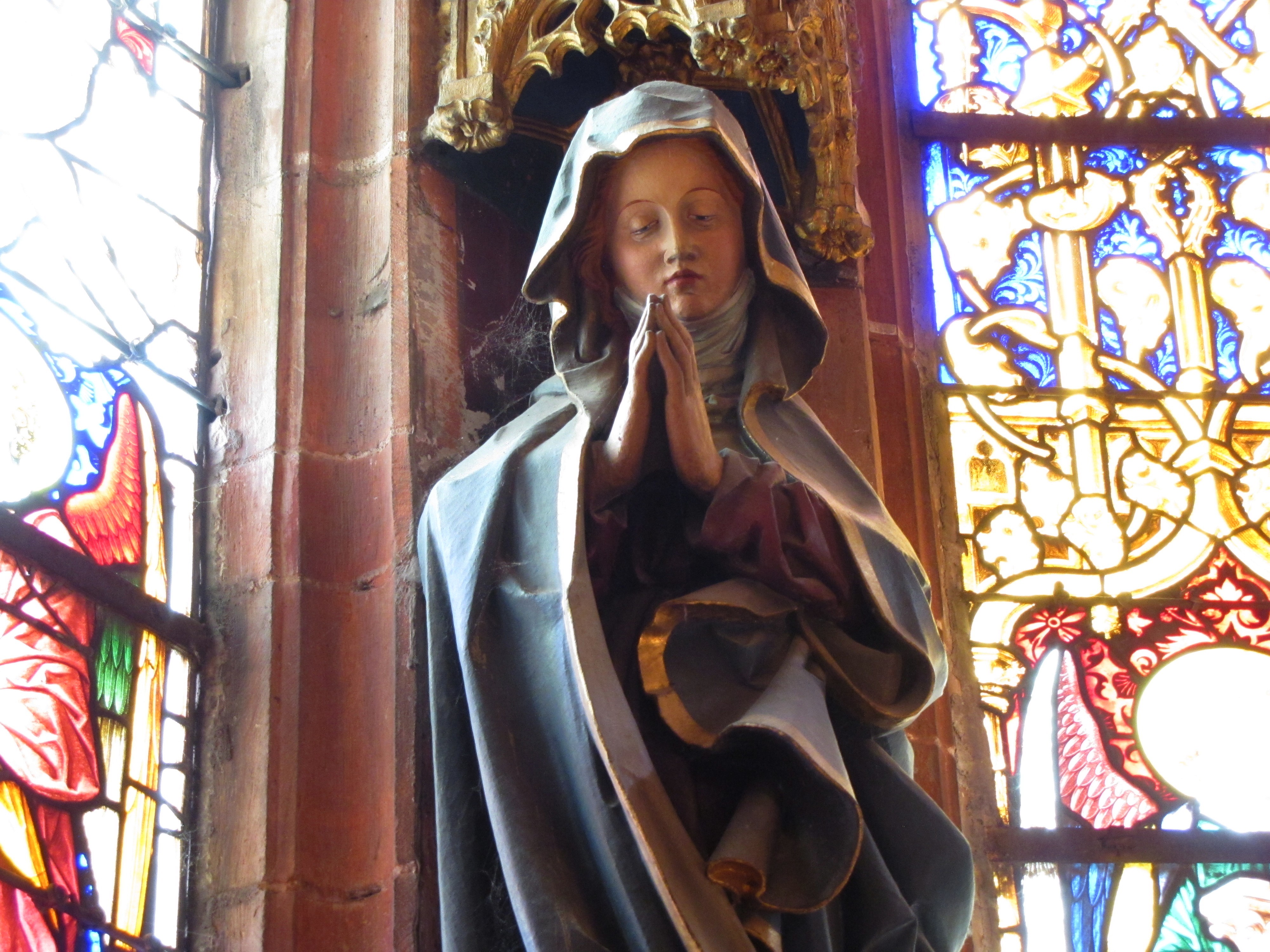
A statue of Mary in the Lutheran church of Saint-Pierre-le-Jeune, Strasbourg

A wide range of views on Mary exist at multiple levels of differentiation within distinct Christian belief systems. In many cases, the views held at any point in history have continued to be challenged and transformed. Over the centuries, Roman Catholic Mariology has been shaped by varying forces ranging from sensus fidelium to Marian apparitions to the writings of the saints to reflection by theologians and papal encyclicals.

Eastern Orthodox theology calls Mary the Theotokos, which means God-bearer. The virginal motherhood of Mary stands at the center of Orthodox Mariology, in which the title Ever Virgin is often used. The Orthodox Mariological approach emphasizes the sublime holiness of Mary, her share in redemption and her role as a mediator of grace.

Eastern Orthodox mariological thought dates as far back as Saint John Damascene who in the 8th century wrote on the mediative role of Mary and on the Dormition of the Mother of God. In the 14th century, Orthodox Mariology began to flourish among Byzantine theologians who held a cosmic view of Mariology, placing Jesus and Mary together at the center of the cosmos and saw them as the goal of world history. More recently Eastern Orthodox Mariology achieved a renewal among 20th century theologians in Russia, for whom Mary is the heart of the Church and the center of creation. However, unlike the Catholic approach, Eastern Orthodox Mariology does not support the Immaculate Conception of Mary. Prior to the 20th century, Eastern Orthodox Mariology was almost entirely liturgical, and had no systematic presentation similar to Roman Catholic Mariology. However, 20th century theologians such as Sergei Bulgakov began the development of a detailed systematic Orthodox Mariology. Bulgakov's Mariological formulation emphasizes the close link between Mary and the Holy Spirit in the mystery of the Incarnation.

Protestant views on Mary vary from denomination to denomination. They focus generally on interpretations of Mary in the Bible, the Apostles' Creed, (which professes the Virgin Birth), and the Ecumenical Council of Ephesus, in 431, which called Mary the Mother of God. While some early Protestants created Marian art and allowed limited forms of Marian veneration, most Protestants today do not share the veneration of Mary practiced by Roman Catholics and Eastern Orthodox. Martin Luther's views on Mary, John Calvin's views on Mary, Karl Barth's views on Mary and others have all contributed to modern Protestant views. Anglican Marian theology varies greatly, from the Anglo-Catholic (very close to Roman Catholic views) to the more Reformed views. The Anglican Church formally celebrates six Marian feasts, Annunciation (25 March), Visitation (31 May), Day of Saint Mary (Assumption or dormition) (15 August), Nativity of Mary (8 September), Our Lady of Walsingham (15 October) and Mary's Conception (8 December). Anglicans, along with other Protestants, teach the divine maternity and the virgin birth of Jesus, although there is no systematic agreed upon Mariology among the diverse parts of the Anglican Communion. However, the role of Mary as a mediator is accepted by some groups of modern Anglican theologians. Lutheran Mariology is informed by the Augsburg Confession and honours Mary as "the most blessed Mother of God, the most blessed Virgin Mary, and the Mother of Christ." The Smalcald Articles, a confession of faith of the Lutheran Churches, affirm the doctrine of the perpetual virginity of Mary.

The Oriental Orthodox Churches regard Mary as the highest of saints and the Theotokos. It celebrates various Marian feast days.

A better mutual understanding among different Christian groups regarding their Mariology has been sought in a number of ecumenical meetings which produced common documents.

Outside Christianity, the Islamic view of the Virgin Mary, known as Maryam in Arabic, is that she was an extremely pious and chaste woman who miraculously gave birth while still a virgin to the prophet Jesus, known in Arabic as Isa. Mary is the only woman specifically named in the Qur'an. The nineteenth chapter of the Qur'an, which is named after her, begins with two narrations of "miraculous birth".

== Development ==
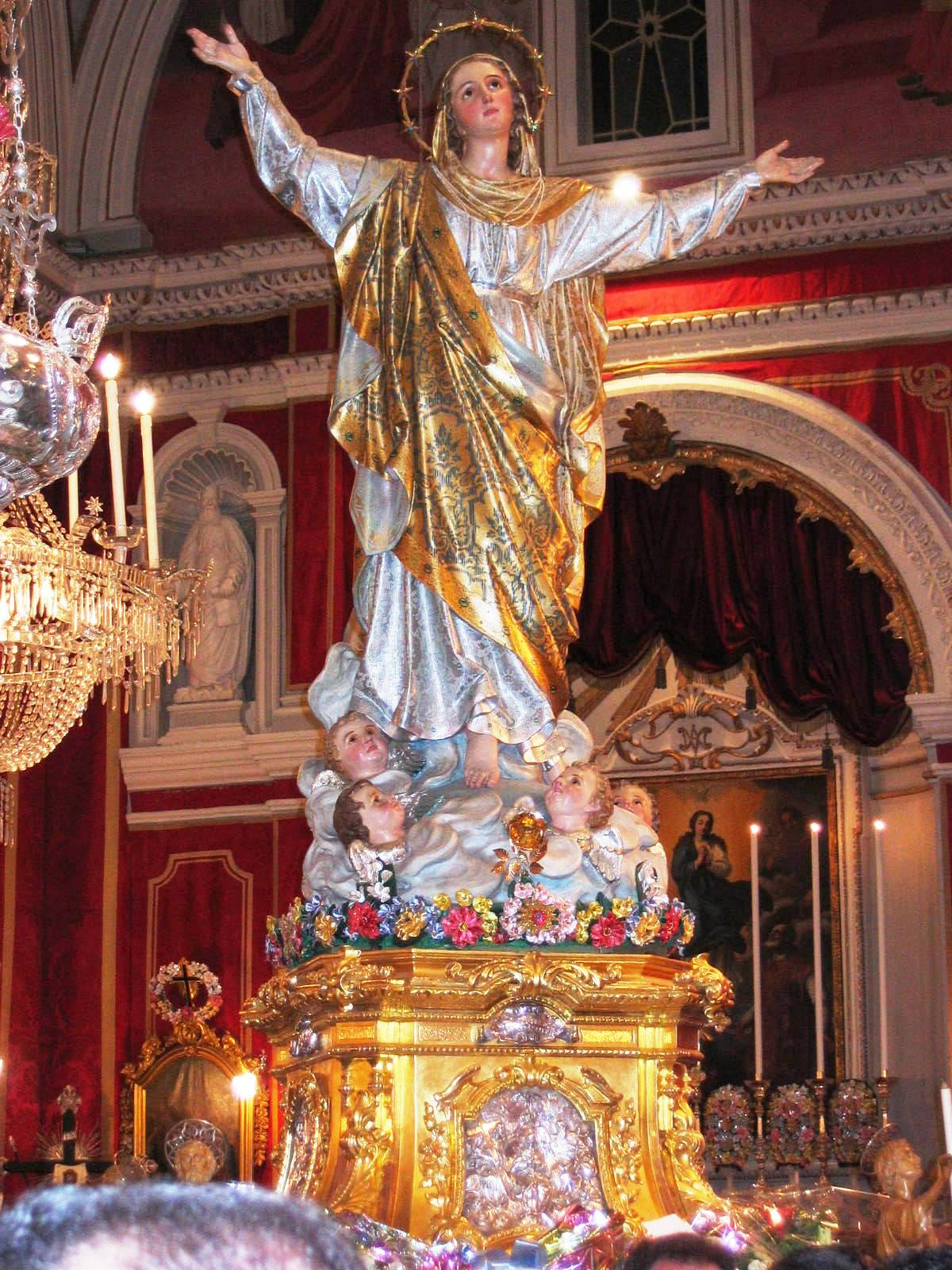
Statue of Santa Maria Assunta, in Attard, Malta

The First Council of Ephesus in 431 formally approved devotion to Mary as Theotokos, which most accurately translated means God-bearer; its use implies that Jesus, to whom Mary gave birth, is God. Nestorians preferred Christotokos meaning "Christ-bearer" or "Mother of the Messiah" not because they denied Jesus' divinity, but because they believed that since God the Son or Logos existed before time and before Mary, Jesus therefore took divinity from God the Father and humanity from his mother, so calling her "Mother of God" was confusing and potentially heretical. Others at the council believed that denying the Theotokos title would carry with it the implication that Jesus was not divine.

The council of Ephesus also approved the creation of icons bearing the images of the Virgin and Child. Devotion to Mary was, however, already widespread before this point, reflected in the fresco depictions of Mother and Child in the Roman catacombs. The early Church Fathers saw Mary as the "new Eve" who said "yes" to God as Eve had said "no". Mary, as the first Christian Saint and Mother of Jesus, was deemed to be a compassionate mediator between suffering mankind and her son, Jesus, who was seen as King and Judge.

In the East, devotion to Mary blossomed in the sixth century under official patronage and imperial promotion at the Court of Constantinople. The popularity of Mary as an individual object of devotion, however, only began in the fifth century with the appearance of apocryphal versions of her life, interest in her relics, and the first churches dedicated to her name, for example, S. Maria Maggiore in Rome. A sign that the process was slower in Rome is provided by the incident during the visit of Pope Agapetus to Constantinople in 536, when he was upbraided for opposing the veneration of the theotokos and refusing to allow her icons to be displayed in Roman churches. Early seventh-century examples of new Marian dedications in Rome are the dedication in 609 of the pagan Pantheon as Santa Maria ad Martyres, "Holy Mary and the Martyrs", and the re-dedication of the early Christian titulus Julii et Calixtii, one of the oldest Roman churches, as Santa Maria in Trastevere. The earliest Marian feasts were introduced into the Roman liturgical calendar by Pope Sergius I (687–701).

During the Middle Ages, devotion to the Virgin Mary as the "new Eve" lent much to the status of women. Women who had been looked down upon as daughters of Eve, came to be looked upon as objects of veneration and inspiration. The medieval development of chivalry, with the concept of the honor of a lady and the ensuing knightly devotion to it, not only derived from the thinking about the Virgin Mary, but also contributed to it. The medieval veneration of the Virgin Mary was contrasted by the fact that ordinary women, especially those outside aristocratic circles, were looked down upon. Although women were at times viewed as the source of evil, it was Mary who as mediator to God was a source of refuge for man. The development of medieval Mariology and the changing attitudes towards women paralleled each other and can best be understood in a common context.

Since the Reformation, some Protestants accuse Roman Catholics of having developed an un-Christian adoration and worship of Mary, described as Marianism or Mariolatry, and of inventing non-scriptural doctrines which give Mary a semi-divine status. They also attack titles such as Queen of Heaven, Our Mother in Heaven, Queen of the World, or Mediatrix.

Since the writing of the apocryphal Protevangelium of James, various beliefs have circulated concerning Mary's own conception, which eventually led to the Roman Catholic Church dogma, formally established in the 19th century, of Mary's Immaculate Conception, which exempts her from original sin.

Roman Catholic and Eastern Orthodox teaching also extends to the end of Mary's life ending with the Assumption of Mary, formally established as dogma in 1950, and the Dormition of the Mother of God respectively.

== As a theological discipline ==
Within Lutheran Marian theology and Anglican Marian theology the Blessed Virgin Mary holds a place of honour. In the Eastern Orthodox Church, a number of traditions revolve around the Ever – Virgin Mary and the Theotokos, which are theologically paramount concepts.

As an active theological discipline, Mariology has received a larger amount of formal attention in Roman Catholic Mariology based on the four dogmas on Mary which are a part of Roman Catholic theology. The Second Vatican Council document Lumen gentium summarized the views on Roman Catholic Mariology, its focus being on the veneration of the Mother of God. Over time, Roman Catholic Mariology has been expanded by contributions from Liberation Theology, which emphasizes popular Marian piety, and more recently from feminist theology, which stresses both the equality of women and gender differences.

While systematic Marian theology is not new, Pope Pius XII is credited with promoting the independent theological study of Mary on a large scale with the creation or elevation of four papal Mariological research centres in Rome, e.g. the Marianum. The papal institutes were created to foster Mariological research and to explain and support the Roman Catholic veneration of Mary. This new orientation was continued by Popes John XXIII, Paul VI and John Paul II with the additional creation of the Pontifica Academia Mariana Internationale and the Centro di Cultura Mariana, a pastoral center to promulgate Marian teachings of the Church, and the Societa Mariologica Italiana, an Italian mariological society with an interdisciplinary orientation.

=== Theology ===
There are two distinct approaches as to how Mariology might interact with conventional theological treatises: one is for Marian perspectives and aspects to be inserted into the conventional treatises, the other is to offer an independent presentation. The first approach was followed by the Church Fathers and in the Middle Ages, although some issues were treated separately. This method has the advantage that it avoids isolating Mariology from the rest of theology. The disadvantage of this method is that it cannot assess Mary to the full extent of her role and her person, and the inherent connections between various Mariological assertions can not be highlighted. The second method has the disadvantage that it may impose the limitations of isolation and at times overstep its theological boundaries. However, these problems can be avoided in the second approach if specific reference is made in each case to connect it to the processes of salvation, redemption, etc.

=== Methodology ===
As a field of study, Mariology uses the sources, methods and criteria of theology, beginning with the Marian reference in the Apostles' Creed. In Mariology the question of scriptural basis is more accentuated. In Roman Catholic Mariology, the overall context of Catholic doctrines and other Church teachings are also taken into account. The Marian Chapter of the Vatican II document, Lumen gentium, includes twenty-six biblical references. They refer to the conception, birth and childhood of Jesus, Mary's role in several events and her presence at the foot of the cross. Of importance to Mariological methodology is a specific Vatican II statement that these reports are not allegories with symbolic value but historical revelations, a point further emphasized by Pope Benedict XVI.

=== Organization ===
The treatment of Mariology differs among theologians. Some prefer to present its historical development, while others focus on its content (dogmas, grace, role in redemption, etc.). Some theologians prefer to view Mariology only in terms of Mary's attributes (honour, titles, privileges), while others attempt to integrate Mary into the overall theology of the salvation mystery of Jesus Christ.

Some prominent 20th century theologians, such as Karl Barth and Karl Rahner, viewed Mariology only as a part of Christology. However, differences exist between them, e.g. Hugo Rahner, the brother of Karl Rahner, disagreed and developed a Mariology based on the writers of the early Church, including Ambrose of Milan and Augustine of Hippo among others. He viewed Mary as the mother and model for the Church, a view later highlighted by Popes Paul VI through Benedict XVI.

== Relation to other theological disciplines ==
=== Christology ===
While Christology has been the subject of detailed study, some Marian views, in particular in Roman Catholic Mariology, see it as an essential basis for the study of Mary. Generally, Protestant denominations do not agree with this approach.

The concept that by being the "Mother of God", Mary has a unique role in salvation and redemption was contemplated and written about in the early Church. In recent centuries, Roman Catholic Mariology has come to be viewed as a logical and necessary consequence of Christology: Mary contributes to a fuller understanding of who Christ is and what he did. In these views, Mariology can be derived from the Christocentric mysteries of Incarnation: Jesus and Mary are son and mother, redeemer and redeemed.

=== Church history ===
Within the field of Church history, Mariology is concerned with the development of Marian teachings and the various forms of Marian culture. An important part of Church history is patristics or patrology, the teaching of the early Fathers of the Church. They give indications of the faith of the early Church and are analyzed in terms of their statements on Mary.

In the Roman Catholic context, patrology and dogmatic history have provided a basis for popes to justify Marian doctrine, veneration, and dogmas such as the Immaculate Conception and the Assumption. Thus, in Fulgens corona and Munificentissimus Deus, Pope Pius XII explained the two dogmas in terms of existing biblical references to Mary, the patristic tradition, and the strong historical faith of believers (sensus fidelium) using a deductive theological method.

=== Moral theology ===
Some scholars do not see a direct relation of Mariology to moral theology. Pius X, however, described Mary as the model of virtue, and a life free of sin, living a life which exemplifies many of the moral teachings of the Roman Catholic Church. As a result, Mary is often cited in this guise in pastoral theology and in sermons.

== See also ==
- Josephology
- Flag of Europe § Marian interpretation
- Mother of God (Theotokos)
