= Raimondo Spiazzi =

Italian Catholic priest and theologian (1918–2002)

Raimondo Spiazzi OP (18 January 1918 – 14 October 2002) was an Italian Catholic theologian, advisor to Pope Pius XII, and Mariologist with over 2,500 publications.

== Early Biography ==
Spiazzi was born on 18 January 1918 in Moneglia, province of Genoa.

== Formation ==
He met Cardinal Secretary of State Eugenio Pacelli in 1937, who left a major impression on him and facilitated his entry in the seminary. 25 March 1944, he was ordained to the priesthood. During the war years he taught religion in a secondary school in Turin. After the war, he studied at the Pontifical International Athenaeum Angelicum, the future Pontifical University of St. Thomas Aquinas, Angelicum in Rome and completed his doctorate in Sacred Theology there in 1947 with a dissertation entitled Il cristianesimo perfezione dell'uomo.

== Career ==
He taught in Rome at the Angelicum until 1972. Spiazzi, a tireless scholar authored 2.500 publications of which are 150 publications in book format. l'Edizione Marietti dell'Opera Omnia di San Tommaso d'Aquino, l'Enciclopedia Moderna del Cristinesimo, l'Enciclopedia Mariana "Theotòcos". Many of his later publications are in the area of Mariology.

In 1959, Spiazzi published an article, which costs him banning from Rome and the wrath of Pope John XXIII. Aware of discussions on the continued mandatory priestly celibacy, most prominently by the Cardinal Archbishop Emmanuel Célestin Suhard of Paris, Spiazzi argued in Monitor Ecclesiasticus, that historical evidence for mandatory priestly celibacy was extremely shaky. He pointed out, that even at the Ecumenical Council of Trent, the fathers did not consider clerical celibacy a matter of divine positive law, "nor could they since there were validly ordained married priests in communion with Rome".

Pope John XXIII was not amused. He could not punish the Cardinal of Paris, but Spiazzi had to leave his teaching position and Rome within 24 hours. At the Roman synod on 27 January 1960, the Pontiff affirmed mandatory celibacy as a permanent reminder of the heroic age, in which the Church had to do battle and succeeded to the extent that it won the triple title and emblem of its victory: The Church of Christ, free, chaste Catholic.

Spiazzi was theological advisor to Pope Pius XII from 1954 until his death in October 1958. During this time, the Pontiff issued two Marian encyclicals, Ad Caeli Reginam and Fulgens corona. After the death of the Pope he wrote several books, in which he illustrated the modern nature and applicability of the Magisterium of Pius XII. He participated in two seminars in the Vatican on the theology and ecclesiology of the late pontiff. A bitter disagreement developed in a 9 October 1992 seminar, when Cardinal Fiorenzo Angelini accused Raimondo Spiazzi of misrepresenting the late Pope. Angelini, who had come late to the Spiazzi presentation, had most probably misinterpreted him. The encyclical Mystici corporis, was in the view of Spiazzi, a most important legacy of Pope Pius XII and a manifestation not only of his Christology but also of his Mariology. After a serious illness, Spiazzi left Rome in 1997. He was Ordinarius member of Pontifical Academy of Mary.

Raimondo Spiazzi died in 2004 at Varazze, province of Savona.

== Selected works ==
- Processo a Pio XII Intervista con Raimondo Spiazzi (1979)
- Pio XII, mezzo secolo dopo (1991)
- Il Cardinale Giuseppe Siri (1990)
- Echi et Commenti della Proclamazione del Domma dell’Assunzione (with Augustin Bea and Pietro Parente; 1954)
- Da San Sisto sull'Appia al SS Rosario a Monte Mario (1999)
- L'Enciclopedia Moderna del Cristianesimo
- L'Enciclopedia Mariana (1965?)
- L'Edizione Marietti dell'Opera Omnia di San Tommaso d'Aquino
- Cronache e fioretti del Monastero di San Sisto all'Appia (1994)
- San Domenico e il monastero di San Sisto all'Appia (1994)
- San Tommaso d'Aquino: biografia documentata (1997)
- Temi e problemi di Teologia Politica (1988)
- Dottrina soziale della Chiesa (1989)
- Enciclopedia del pensiero sociale cristiano (1992)

== Sources ==
- Raimondo Spiazzi, Processo a Pio XII Intervista con Raomondo Spiazzi, Pan Editrice, Milan, 1979
- ivoltialsignore.blogspot.com/2007/10/in-memoriam-padre-raimondo-spiazzi
