= Protestant views on Mary =

Views in Protestantism of Mary, mother of Jesus

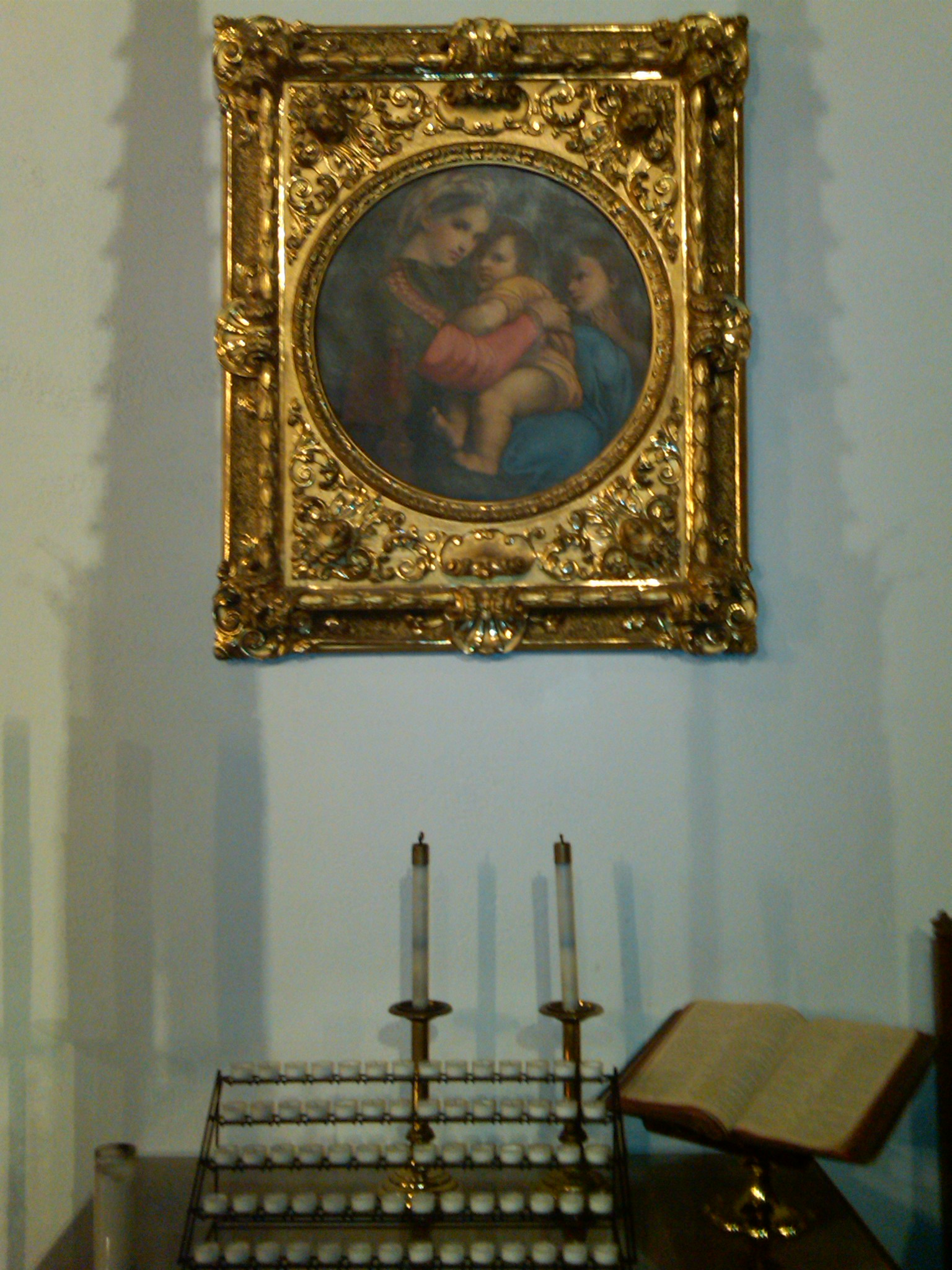
Madonna and Child painting in the vestry of a Methodist church

Protestant views on Mary include the theological positions of major Protestant representatives such as Martin Luther and John Calvin as well as some modern representatives. While it is difficult to generalize about the place of Mary, mother of Jesus in Protestantism given the great diversity of Protestant beliefs, some summary statements are attempted.

== Protestant theologians ==
Some early Protestant Reformers venerated and honored Mary. Martin Luther said of Mary:

the honor given to the mother of God has been rooted so deeply into the hearts of men that no one wants to hear any opposition to this celebration... We also grant that she should be honored, since we, according to Saint Paul's words [Romans 12] are indebted to show honor one to another for the sake of the One who dwells in us, Jesus Christ. Therefore we have an obligation to honor Mary. But be careful to give her honor that is fitting. Unfortunately, I worry that we give her all too high an honor for she is accorded much more esteem than she should be given or than she accounted to herself.

Zwingli said, "I esteem immensely the Mother of God" and "The more the honor and love of Christ increases among men, so much the esteem and honor given to Mary should grow".

Thus the idea of respect and high honour was not rejected by the first Protestants; but rather it was the matter of degrees of honor given to Mary, as the mother of Jesus, that Protestant Reformers were concerned with, and therefore the practical implications for Mariology are still a matter of debate.

=== John Wycliffe ===
The pre-Lutheran reformer John Wycliffe reflected the Marian spirit of the later Middle Ages in one of his earlier sermons: "It seems to me impossible that we should obtain the reward of Heaven without the help of Mary. There is no sex or age, no rank or position, of anyone in the whole human race, which has no need to call for the help of the Holy Virgin."

=== Martin Luther ===
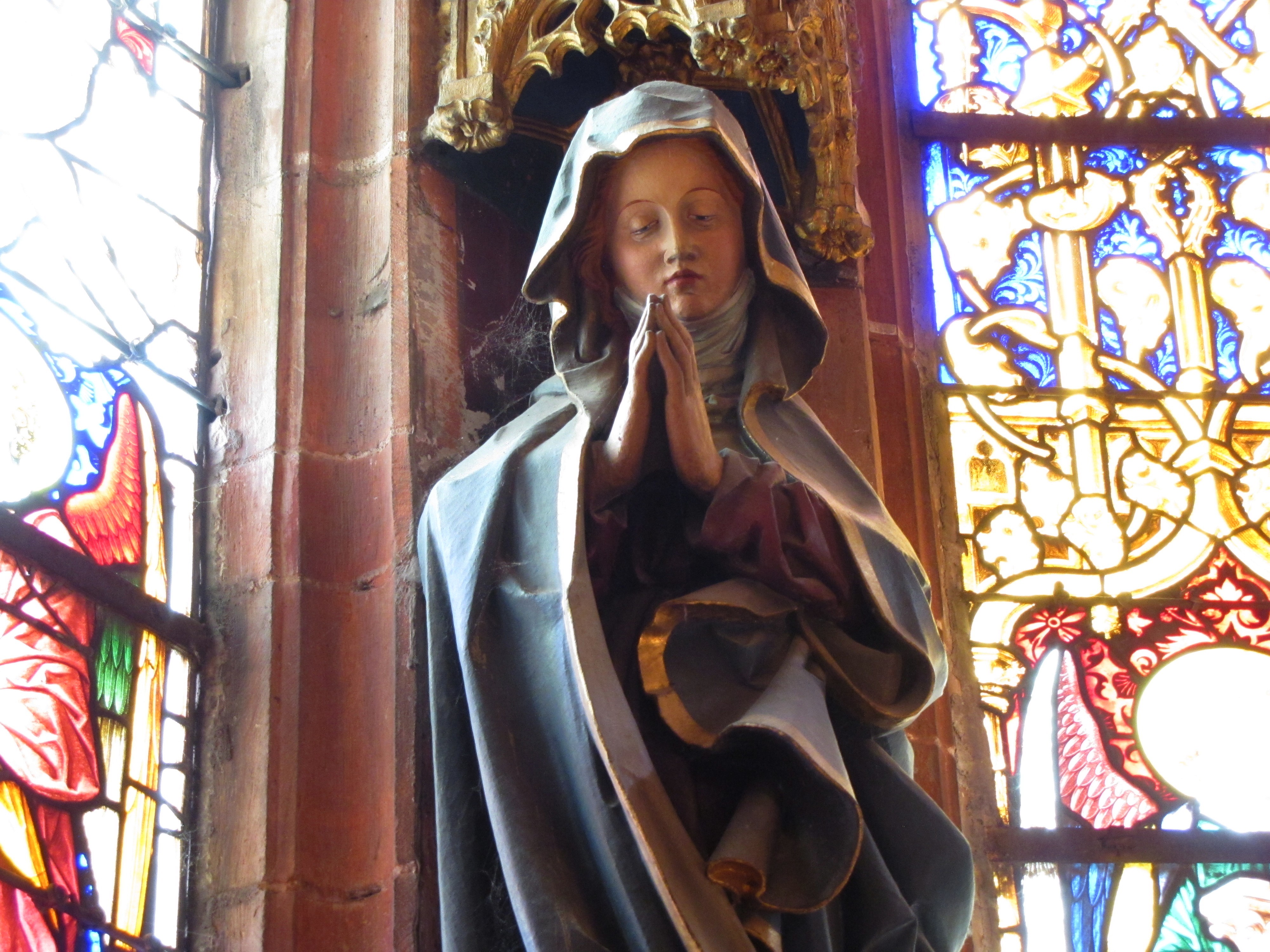
A statue of Mary in the Lutheran church of Saint-Pierre-le-Jeune, Strasbourg

Despite Luther's polemics against his Roman Catholic opponents over issues concerning Mary and the saints, theologians appear to agree that Luther adhered to the Marian decrees of the ecumenical councils and dogmas of the church. He held fast to the belief that Mary was a perpetual virgin, and the Theotokos or Mother of God. Special attention is given to the assertion that Luther, some 300 years before the dogmatization of the Immaculate Conception by Pope Pius IX in 1854, was a firm adherent of that view. Others maintain that Luther in later years changed his position on the Immaculate Conception, which, at that time was undefined in the Church, maintaining however the sinlessness of Mary throughout her life. Regarding the Assumption of Mary, he stated that the Bible did not say anything about it. Important to him was the belief that Mary and the saints do live on after death. "Throughout his career as a priest-professor-reformer, Luther preached, taught, and argued about the veneration of Mary with a verbosity that ranged from childlike piety to sophisticated polemics. His views are intimately linked to his Christocentric theology and its consequences for liturgy and piety." Luther, while revering Mary, came to criticize the "Papists" for blurring the line, between high admiration of the grace of God wherever it is seen in a human being, and religious service given to another creature. He considered the Roman Catholic practice of making intercessory requests addressed especially to Mary and other departed saints to be idolatry.

=== John Calvin ===
John Calvin accepted Mary's perpetual virginity and the title "Mother of God", in a qualified sense. However, he takes extreme exception to what he regards as the excessive veneration of the "Papists", honour which is due only to Jesus Christ. Calvin stated that Mary cannot be the advocate of the faithful, since she needs God's grace as much as any other human being. If the Catholic Church praises her as Queen of Heaven, it is blasphemous and contradicts her own intention, because she is praised and not God.

Calvin expressed deep concern over its possible "superstitious" use of the title "Mother of God" from the teachings of the Council of Ephesus:

I do not doubt that there has been some ignorance in their having reproved this mode of speech, — that the Virgin Mary is the Mother of God … I cannot dissemble that it is found to be a bad practice ordinarily to adopt this title in speaking of this Virgin: and, for my part, I cannot consider such language as good, proper, or suitable… for to say, the Mother of God for the Virgin Mary, can only serve to harden the ignorant in their superstitions.

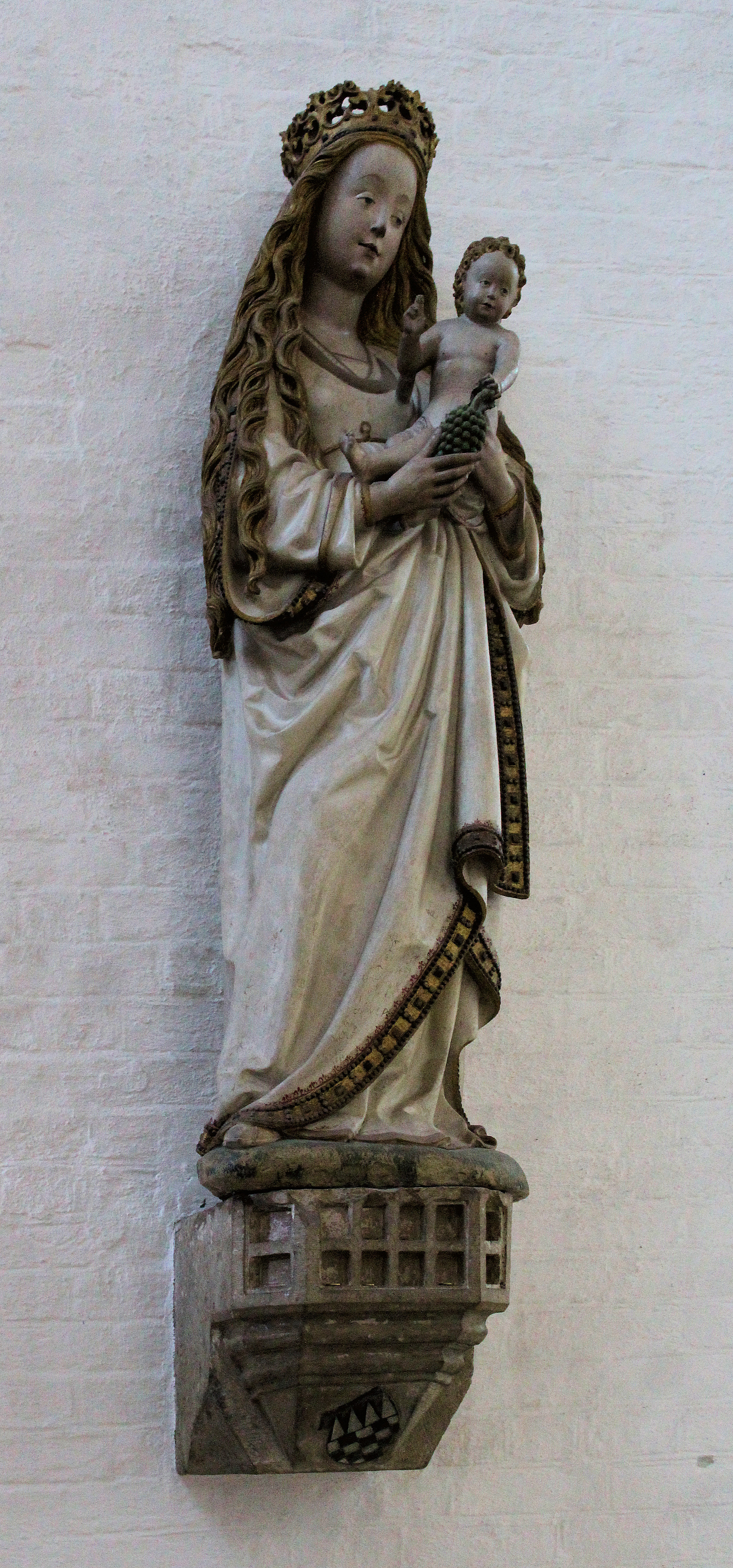
Statue of the Virgin Mary in the Lutheran Cathedral of Lübeck, Germany.

=== Karl Barth ===
Karl Barth (1886–1968), a Reformed Protestant, was a leading 20th century theologian. Aware of the common dogmatic tradition of the early Church, Barth fully accepted the dogma of Mary as the Mother of God. In his view, through Mary, Jesus belongs to the human race; through Jesus, Mary is Mother of God. Barth also agreed with the Dogma of the Virgin Birth. It meant to him that Jesus as a human does not have a father and that as the Son of God he has no mother. The Holy Spirit, through whom Mary conceived, is not just any spirit, but it is God himself whose act must be understood spiritually and not physically. Mary is "full of grace" according to Barth, but this grace is not earned but totally given to her. Regarding Mary's virginity after birth, Barth argued that the Church adopted this position not because of Mary but in defence of its Christology. Barth considered the Roman Catholic veneration of Mary a terrible mistake and idolatrous heresy.

=== James Dunn ===
New Testament scholar James Dunn discusses the tradition of Catholic dulia and Marian Veneration in Augustine and Aquinas, mentioning that the new testament's use of δουλεία (pronounced dulia) is always used negatively. He states:

"douleia occurs only in the sense of 'slavery, servility', and always in a negative sense – the slavery to physical corruption (Rom. 8.21), slavery to the law (Gal. 5.1), slavery to the fear of death (Heb. 2.15)" as well as the devil (cf. Heb 2.14–15 [Jesus' death breaks] the power of him who holds the power of death—that is, the devil— 15 and free those who all their lives were held in slavery by their fear of death").

==== New Testament uses of "δουλεία" ====
Romans 8:15	For you did not receive the spirit of slavery (douleias | δουλείας | gen sg fem) leading back to fear, but you received the Spirit of adoption. By him we cry out, “Abba! Father!”
Romans 8:21	that the creation itself will be set free from its bondage (douleias | δουλείας | gen sg fem) to decay into the glorious freedom of the children of God.
Galatians 4:24	This may be interpreted allegorically, for these women represent two covenants. One is from Mount Sinai, bearing children to be slaves (douleian | δουλείαν | acc sg fem); she is Hagar.
Galatians 5:1	For freedom Christ has set us free. Stand firm, therefore, and do not be subject again to a yoke of slavery (douleias | δουλείας | gen sg fem).
Hebrews 2:15	and liberate those who throughout life were held in (douleias | δουλείας | gen sg fem) slavery (douleias | δουλείας | gen sg fem) by their fear of death.

== Issues in Protestant theology ==
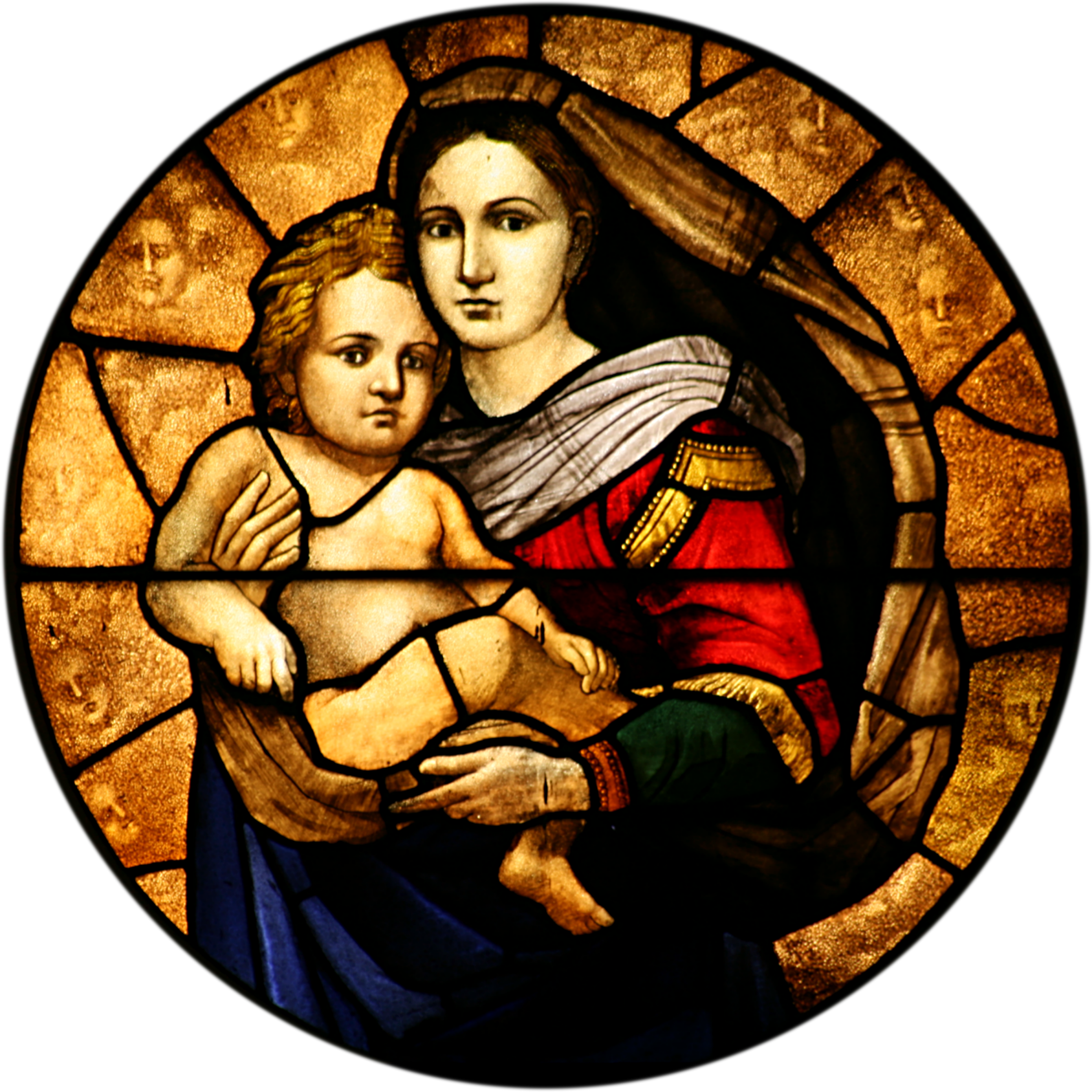
Stained glass depiction of Madonna and Child, St. John's Anglican Church, Ashfield, New South Wales, Australia

=== Mother of God ===
The designation Theotokos (in Greek: Θεοτόκος) or "Bearer of God" for Mary emerged in the Church of Alexandria and was later adopted by the patristic-era universal Church at the Council of Ephesus in 431. It is a statement of Christological orthodoxy (See: hypostasis) in opposition to Nestorianism and also a devotional title of Mary used extensively in Eastern Orthodox, Roman Catholic, Oriental Orthodox, Lutheran and Anglican liturgy. The second verse of a well known Anglican hymn, Ye Watchers and Ye Holy Ones, is directly addressed to Mary and is based on an Orthodox prayer.

Presently the Lutheran World Federation accepts the teachings of the Council of Ephesus and other ecumenical councils of the patristic-era Church, including the formulation "Mother of God" as a function of Christ's hypostatic union. Luther says:

We too know very well that God did not derive his divinity from Mary; but it does not follow that it is therefore wrong to say that God was born of Mary, that God is Mary’s Son, and that Mary is God’s mother.

=== Mariolatry ===
From the 17th to the 19th centuries various groups of Protestants began to use the term "Mariolatry" to refer to the Catholic, Evangelical Catholic, Anglo-Catholic, Oriental and Eastern Orthodox practices of Marian veneration and devotion. According to their researches, the attention paid to Mary is extreme, and may not only distract from the worship of God, but actually be idolatry.

This trend has taken various directions over time, in that while some Protestants have at times softened their attitude towards it, others have strengthened their opposition in the 21st century. For instance, during the May 2006 celebrations at Our Lady of Walsingham in England, as Anglicans and Catholics held a Marian procession, nonconformist Protestant hecklers held banners that condemned Masses, idolatry, and "Mariolatry".

== See also ==
- Anglican Marian theology
- Mary in Islam
- Roman Catholic Mariology
  - History of Roman Catholic Mariology
- Veneration of Mary in the Catholic Church
