= Karl Barth's views on Mary =

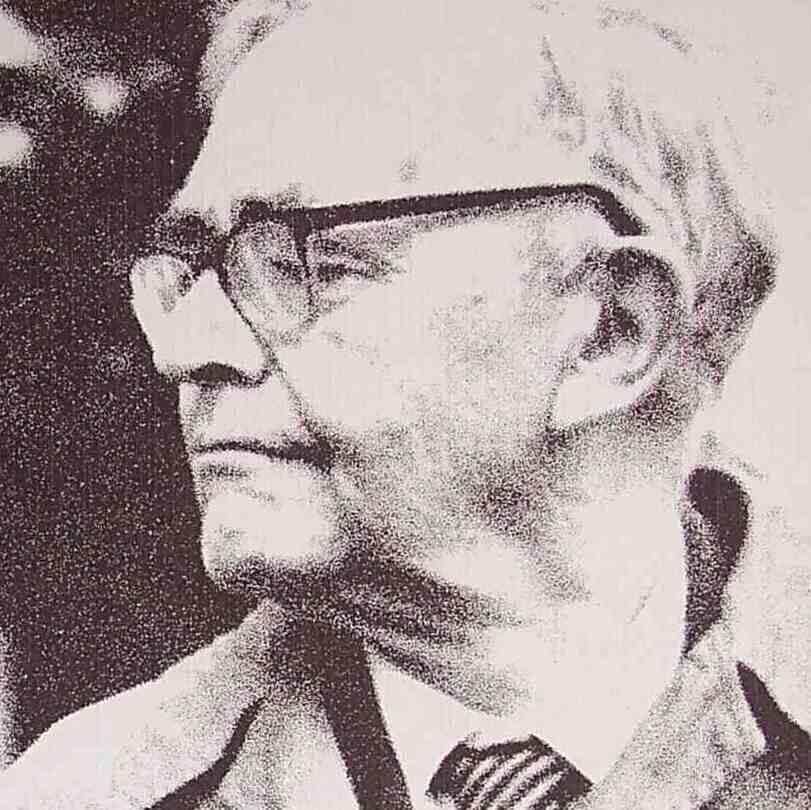
Photograph of Karl Barth

Karl Barth's views on Mary agreed with much Roman Catholic dogma but disagreed with the Catholic veneration of Mary. Barth, a leading 20th-century theologian, was a Reformed Protestant. Aware of the common dogmatic tradition of the early Church, Barth fully accepted the dogma of Mary as the Mother of God. Through Mary, Jesus belongs to the human race. Through Jesus, Mary is Mother of God.

== Background ==
=== Theology of Karl Barth ===
Karl Barth (May 10, 1886 – December 10, 1968) a Swiss Reformed theologian, was one of the most important Christian thinkers of the 20th century. Beginning with his experience as a pastor, he rejected the predominant liberal theology typical of 19th-century Protestantism, especially German, and instead embarked on a unique theological path, often labelled neo-orthodoxy by critics (a label emphatically rejected by Barth himself), that emphasized the sovereignty of God particularly through his innovative doctrine of election. Barth's theology swept through Europe and Britain.

Barth was originally trained in German Protestant Liberalism under such teachers as Wilhelm Herrmann, but reacted against this theology at the time of the First World War. His reaction was fed by several factors, including his commitment to the German and Swiss Religious Socialist movement surrounding men like Hermann Kutter, the influence of the Biblical Realism movement surrounding men like Christoph Blumhardt and Søren Kierkegaard, and the impact of the skeptical philosophy of Franz Overbeck.

=== Epistle to the Romans ===
In his commentary The Epistle to the Romans (Ger. Der Römerbrief; particularly in the thoroughly re-written second edition of 1922) Barth argued that the God who is revealed in the cross of Jesus challenges and overthrows any attempt to ally God with human cultures, achievements, or possessions. Many theologians believe this work to be the most important theological treatise since Friedrich Schleiermacher's On Religion: Speeches to its Cultured Despisers.

In the decade following the First World War, Barth was linked with a number of other theologians, actually very diverse in outlook, who had reacted against their teachers' liberalism, in a movement known as dialectical theology. Other members of the movement included Rudolf Bultmann, Eduard Thurneysen, Emil Brunner, and Friedrich Gogarten.

== Marian views ==
=== The nativity mystery ===
- The nativity mystery “conceived from the Holy Spirit and born from the Virgin Mary”, means, that God became human, truly human out of his own grace. The miracle of the existence of Jesus, his “climbing down of God” is: Holy Spirit and Virgin Mary! Here is a human being, the Virgin Mary, and as he comes from God, Jesus comes also from this human being. Born of the Virgin Mary means a human origin for God. Jesus Christ is not only truly God, he is human like every one of us. He is human without limitation. He is not only similar to us, he is like us.

This means to Barth, God's presence in our world, His presence as man among men and therefore God's revelation to humanity. It also means humanity's reconciliation with God. To Barth, this happened and still happens, it is the substance of the Christmas message.

This God is conceived where we all are conceived. He is born of Mary. She who conceived and bore Him, plays our part in the wonder of Christmas, for it concerns us. God has come to us. "Disguised in our flesh and blood, is the Eternal God."

=== Virgin Birth ===
The Nicene Creed says: Et incarnatus est de Spiritu Sancto ex Maria virgine et homo factus est ("and he [God the Son] put on flesh [in delineation] from the Holy Spirit, out of the Virgin Mary and became a man"). In Barth's theology – in contrast to much of the contemporary liberal theology – this statement is interpreted to mean the dogma of the Virgin Birth. It means that Jesus as a human does not have a father, in the same way that as the Son of God he has no mother. The Holy Spirit, through whom Mary conceived, is not just any spirit, it is God himself whose act must be understood spiritually and not physically. Mary is "full of grace" according to Barth, but this grace is not earned but totally given to her. This is quite similar to Catholic teaching, in which Mary, "by sheer grace," received the fullness of grace from God at the moment of her conception, that she might give her consent at the annunciation. Barth argues that the Church adopted its doctrine of the perpetual virginity of Mary not because of Mary, but in defence of its Christology.

=== Mother of God ===
Karl Barth states that as a Christian and theologian, he does not reject the description of Mary as the "Mother of God." To him, this is a legitimate expression of Christological truth. The description of Mary as the "Mother of God" was and is sensible, permissible and necessary as an auxiliary Christological proposition.

=== Critique of the Catholic view ===
Barth on the other hand sees the term "Mother of God," as "being overloaded by the so-called Mariology of the Roman Catholic Church". He considered the Roman Catholic veneration of Mary a terrible mistake and heresy.

- Where ever Mary is venerated, and devotion to her takes place, there the Church of Christ does not exist.
- Mariology is an excrescence, i.e., a diseased construct of theological thought. Excrescences must be excised.

He warns however, of extending this critique too far:

It is not recommended that we should base our repudiation [of Marian doctrine] on the assertion that there has taken place here an irruption from the heathen sphere, an adoption of the idea, current in many non-Christian religions, of a more or less central and original female or mother deity. In dogmatics you can establish everything and nothing from parallels from the history of religions.

And Barth equally attacks Protestant theology on this issue: "For justice sake, one has to say, that the Protestant rejection of Roman Catholic mariology and Marian cult is dishonest, as long as Protestantism is caught in the same unreal problem". He was a close friend of Hans Urs von Balthasar, who published about him. Barth's dogmatic theology was partly based on Thomas Aquinas, although he departed from Aquinas on many characteristically Catholic points.

== See also ==
- Blessed Virgin Mary
- Theotokos
- Marian doctrines of the Catholic Church
- Mariology (Roman Catholic)

== Sources ==
- Karl Barth, Die kirchliche Dogmatik, Zollikon, Vol.I-IV, 1932-1955
