= Virgin Mary (disambiguation) =

Virgin Mary was a Jewish woman identified in the New Testament and in the Quran as the mother of Jesus through divine intervention.

Virgin Mary may also refer to:

- Virgin Mary (cocktail)
- Virgin Mary (El Greco, Madrid), a 1597 painting in the Museo del Prado, Madrid, Spain
- Virgin Mary (El Greco, Strasbourg), a c. 1594–1604 painting in the Musée des Beaux-Arts, Strasbourg, France
- "Virgin Mary" (song), a 1975 song by Donna Summer
- The Virgin Mary (book), a 1950 book by Giovanni Miegge

== See also ==
- Mary ever virgin (disambiguation)
- Catholic Mariology
- Anglican Marian theology
- Blessed Virgin Mary (Roman Catholic)
- Ecumenical views of Mary
- Islamic view of Virgin Mary
- Lutheran Marian theology
- Protestant views on Mary
- The Holy Virgin Mary, a 1996 painting by Chris Ofilli
