= Lutheran Mariology =

Lutheran views on Mary, mother of Jesus

Lutheran Mariology or Lutheran Marian theology is derived from Scripture, patristic sources, Martin Luther's views of Mary, as well as those of subsequent Lutheran divines. This is taught by the Lutheran churches. Lutheran Mariology developed out of the deep Christian Marian devotion on which Luther was reared, and it was subsequently clarified as part of his mature Christocentric theology and piety. The Apology of the Augsburg Confession, included in the Book of Concord, teaches that Mary is "most worthy of the most ample honors" and that Mary "wishes us to consider and follow her example [the example of her faith and her humility]." Lutherans hold Mary in high esteem, universally teaching the dogmas of the Theotokos and the Virgin Birth. Luther dogmatically asserted what he considered firmly established biblical doctrines such as the divine motherhood of Mary while adhering to pious opinions of the perpetual virginity of Mary, along with the caveat that all doctrine and piety should exalt and not diminish the person and work of Jesus Christ; to this end, Luther emphasized Mary as a receiver of God's love and favour. His opposition to regarding Mary as a mediatrix of redemption was part of his greater and more extensive opposition to the belief that the merits of the saints could be added to those of Jesus Christ to save humanity. The Formula of Concord and the Smalcald Articles, upheld by the Lutheran churches, teach the dogmas of the Theotokos and the perpetual virginity of Mary. Lutheranism regards her as the Blessed Virgin Mary, with this codified in the Formula of Concord. Lutheran denominations may differ in their teaching with respect to various Marian doctrines and have contributed to producing ecumenical meetings and documents on Mary. A number of historic Lutheran churches have a Lady chapel dedicated to the Blessed Virgin Mary. The Lutheran churches celebrate several Marian feast days, including the Feast of the Annunciation of the Blessed Virgin Mary, Feast of the Purification of the Blessed Virgin Mary, and the Visitation of the Blessed Virgin Mary.

== Overview ==
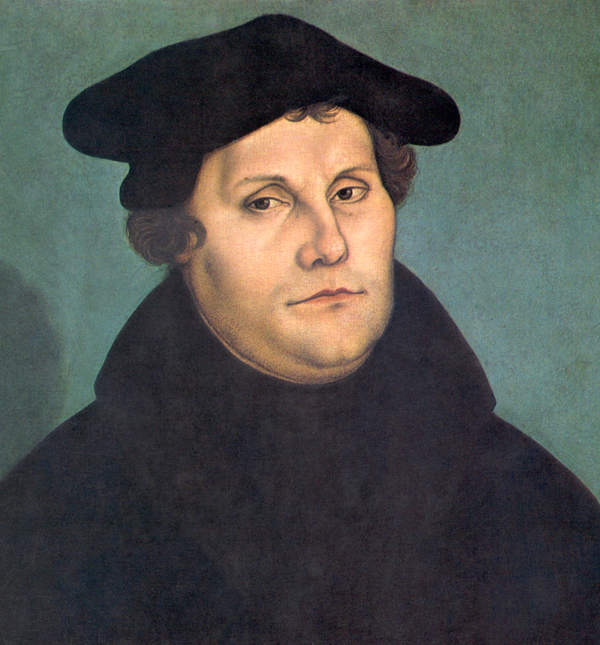
Martin Luther

As documented in the Book of Concord, in the Lutheran churches she is honored as the Blessed Virgin Mary, a reference found in Scripture. The Marian doctrines of the virgin birth, perpetual virginity of the Blessed Virgin Mary, and the Theotokos are taught by the Lutheran Confessions, being named in the Formula of Concord and the Smalcald Articles. The Apology of the Augsburg Confession teaches that "blessed Mary prays for the Church". Additionally, the doctrine of the sinlessness of the Blessed Virgin Mary held by Martin Luther, has been inherited by high church Lutherans. The Lutheran churches celebrate several Marian feast days, including the Feast of the Annunciation of the Blessed Virgin Mary, Feast of the Purification of the Blessed Virgin Mary, and the Visitation of the Blessed Virgin Mary.

The term "Mariology" is used by many Lutherans across liberal-conservative lines. Today, some Lutherans prefer not to use the term "Mariology" to describe their own Marian doctrine because they are concerned the term implies an acceptance of the concept of development of doctrine, though other Lutherans are comfortable with using the term "Mariology". The distinct theology within the Lutheran churches surrounding the Blessed Virgin Mary is known as Lutheran Mariology.

Theologians agree that Luther adhered to the Marian decrees of the ecumenical councils and dogmas of the church. He held fast to the belief that Mary was a perpetual virgin and the Theotokos, the Mother of God. Special attention is given to the assertion that Luther, some 300 years before the dogmatization of the Immaculate Conception by Pope Pius IX in 1854, was a firm adherent of that view. Others maintain that Luther in later years changed his position on the Immaculate Conception, which at that time was undefined in the Church; however, he maintained belief in Mary's lifelong sinlessness. Regarding the Assumption of Mary, he stated that the Bible did not say anything about it. Important to him was the belief that Mary and the saints do live on after death.

The centerpiece of Luther's Marian views was his 1521 Commentary on the Magnificat in which he extolled the magnitude of God's grace toward Mary and her own legacy of Christian instruction and example demonstrated in her canticle of praise. This canticle continues to have an important place in Lutheran liturgy.

== Doctrines ==
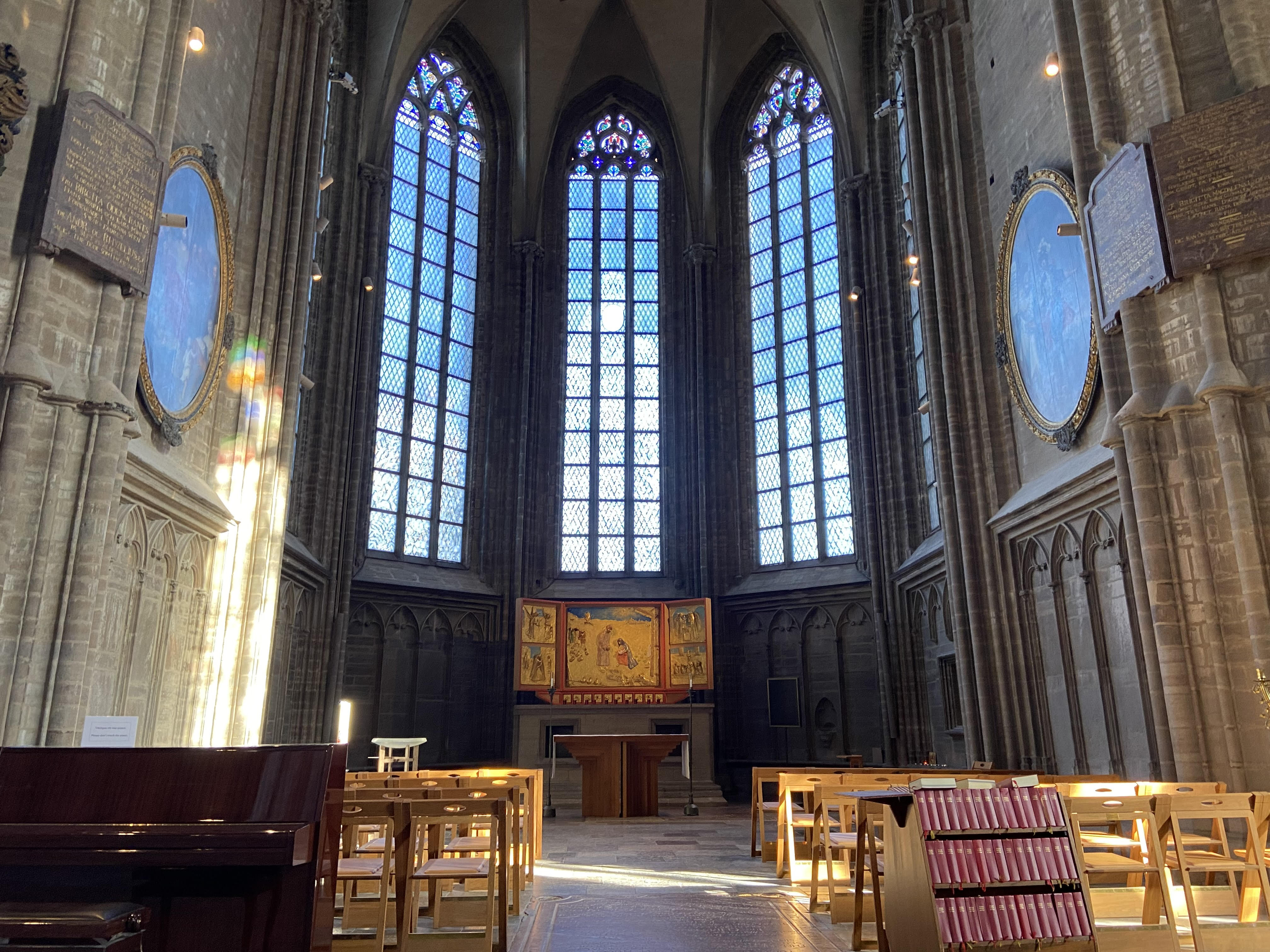
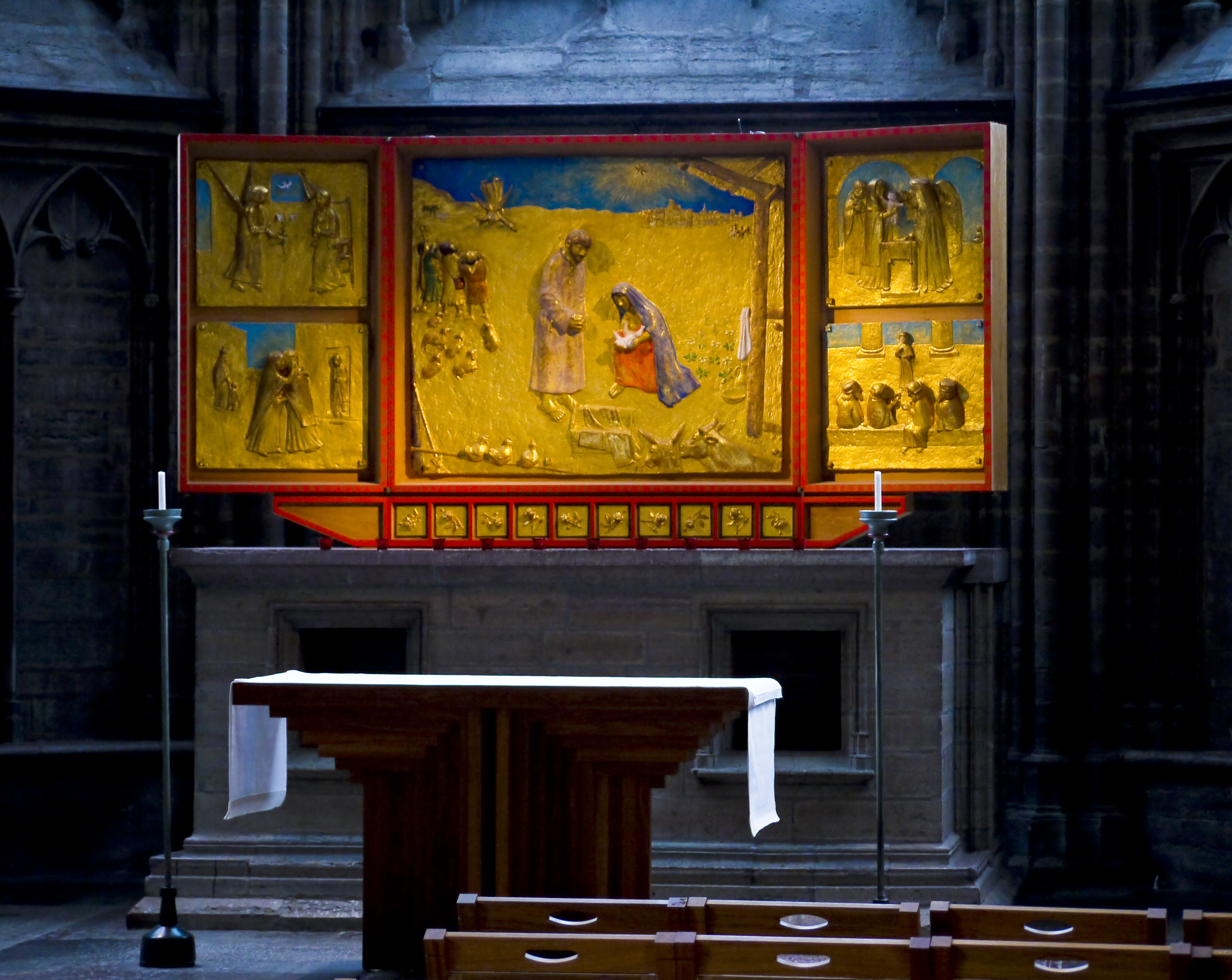
The Lady chapel of Linköping Cathedral, with its 1987 altarpiece containing scenes from the life of the Blessed Virgin Mary, including the Annunciation to the Blessed Virgin Mary, the Visitation of the Blessed Virgin Mary, and the Purification of the Virgin. On the predella are ten roses cast in bronze, which refer to the Hail Mary and the rosary.

=== Mother of God ===
Lutherans believe that the person Jesus is God the Son, the second Person of the Trinity, who was incarnated in the womb of his mother Mary as a human being, and since, as a person, he was "born of the Virgin Mary". Lutherans have always believed that Mary is the Theotokos, the God-bearer, with this dogma being codified in the Formula of Concord. Martin Luther said:

[S]he became the Mother of God, in which work so many and such great good things are bestowed on her as pass man's understanding. For on this there follows all honor, all blessedness, and her unique place in the whole of mankind, among which she has no equal, namely, that she had a child by the Father in heaven, and such a Child.... Hence men have crowded all her glory into a single word, calling her the Mother of God.... None can say of her nor announce to her greater things, even though he had as many tongues as the earth possesses flowers and blades of grass: the sky, stars; and the sea, grains of sand. It needs to be pondered in the heart what it means to be the Mother of God.

This belief was officially confessed by Lutherans in their Formula of Concord, Solid Declaration, article VIII.24:

On account of this personal union and communion of the natures, Mary, the most blessed virgin, did not conceive a mere, ordinary human being, but a human being who is truly the Son of the most high God, as the angel testifies. He demonstrated his divine majesty even in his mother's womb in that he was born of a virgin without violating her virginity. Therefore she is truly the mother of God and yet remained a virgin.

=== Virgin Birth ===
The Lutheran churches teach the doctrine of the virgin birth, as summarized in the Formula of Concord in the Solid Declaration, Article VIII.24.

=== Perpetual virginity ===
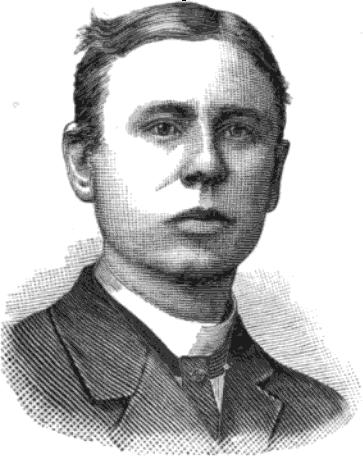
Franz Pieper (June 27, 1852 – June 3, 1931)

The Formula of Concord and the Smalcald Articles teach the perpetual virginity of Mary.

Jaroslav Pelikan noted that the perpetual virginity of Mary was Martin Luther's lifelong belief, and Hartmann Grisar, a Roman Catholic biographer of Luther, concurs that "Luther always believed in the virginity of Mary, even post partum, as affirmed in the Apostles' Creed, though afterwards he denied her power of intercession, as well as that of the saints in general, resorting to many misinterpretations and combated, as extreme and pagan, the extraordinary veneration which the Catholic Church showed towards Mary."

The Smalcald Articles, a confession of faith of the Lutheran churches, affirm the doctrine of the perpetual virginity of the Blessed Virgin Mary, referring to the Blessed Virgin Mary as "ever virgin” (semper virgo). The Formula of Concord declares:

On account of this personal union and communion of the natures, Mary, the most blessed Virgin, bore not a mere man, but, as the angel [Gabriel] testifies, such a man as is truly the Son of the most high God, who showed His divine majesty even in His mother's womb, inasmuch as He was born of a virgin, with her virginity inviolate. Therefore she is truly the mother of God, and nevertheless remained a virgin.

As such, this belief in the perpetual virginity of Mary was held by the Lutheran scholastics, including Johann Konrad Wilhelm Löhe. For this reason Confessional Lutheran scholars, such as Franz Pieper (1852–1931) refused to follow the tendency among non-Lutheran Protestants to insist that Mary and Joseph had marital relations and children after the birth of Jesus. It is implicit in his Christian Dogmatics that belief in Mary's perpetual virginity is the older and traditional view among Lutherans. Some American Lutheran groups such as the Lutheran Church – Missouri Synod, however, later "found no difficulty with the view that Mary and Joseph themselves together had other children". Another American Lutheran denomination, the Evangelical Catholic Church, on the other hand, considered "Saint Mary Ever Virgin, a title affirmed in The Smalcald Articles (Part One, IV [Latin]), and She recognizes her as that Most Praiseworthy Virgin (Augsburg Confession III, 1 [German]; Formula of Concord VIII; Solid Declaration 100 [Latin])."

=== Intercession of Mary for the Church ===
The Apology of the Augsburg Confession teaches that "blessed Mary prays for the Church". The Commentary on the Magnificat implores that the prayer "may not only illumine and teach, but burn and live in body and soul; may Christ grant us this intercession and assistance of his dear Mother, Mary. Amen."

== Veneration ==
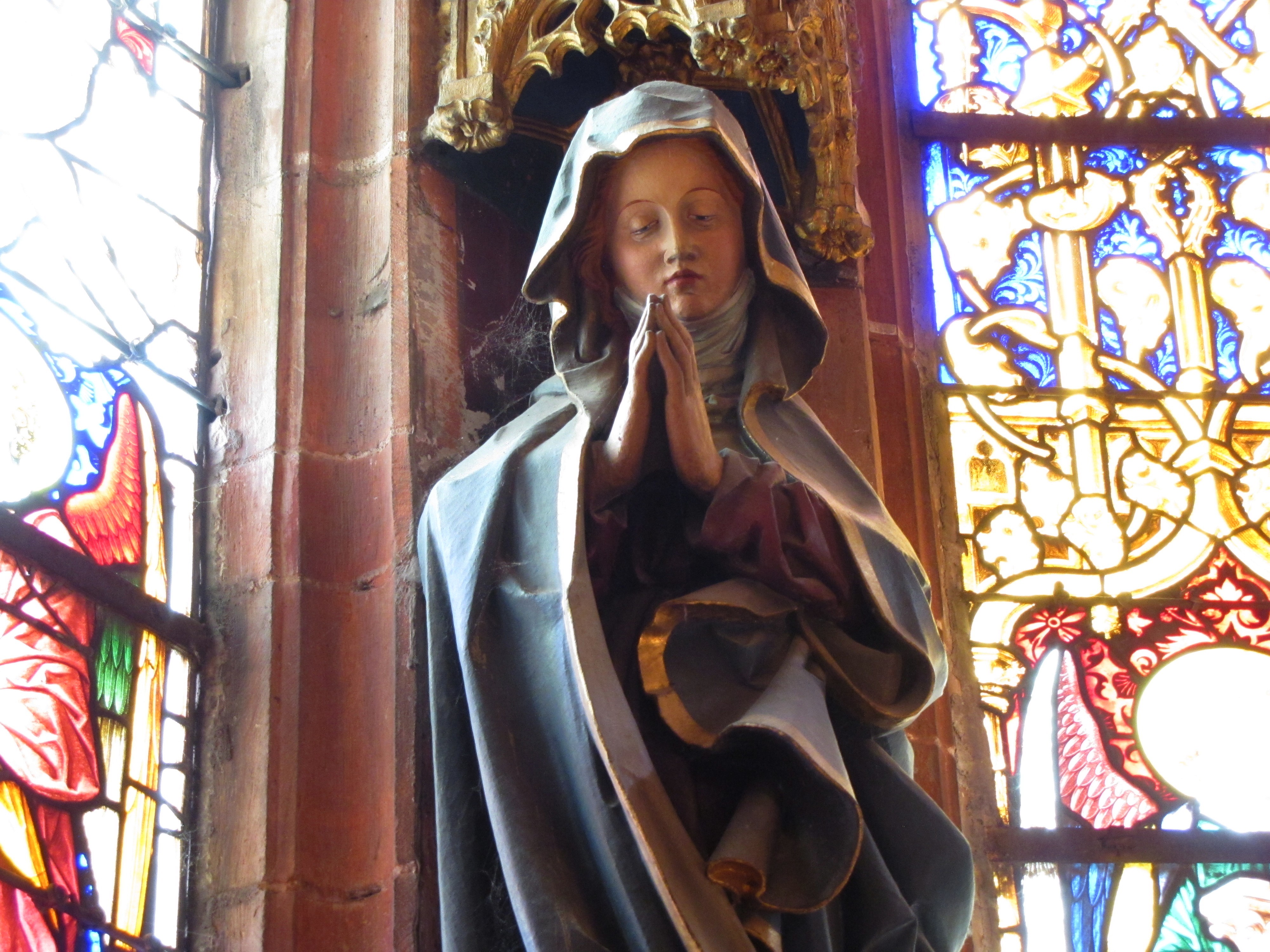
A statue of Mary in the Lutheran church of Saint-Pierre-le-Jeune, Strasbourg

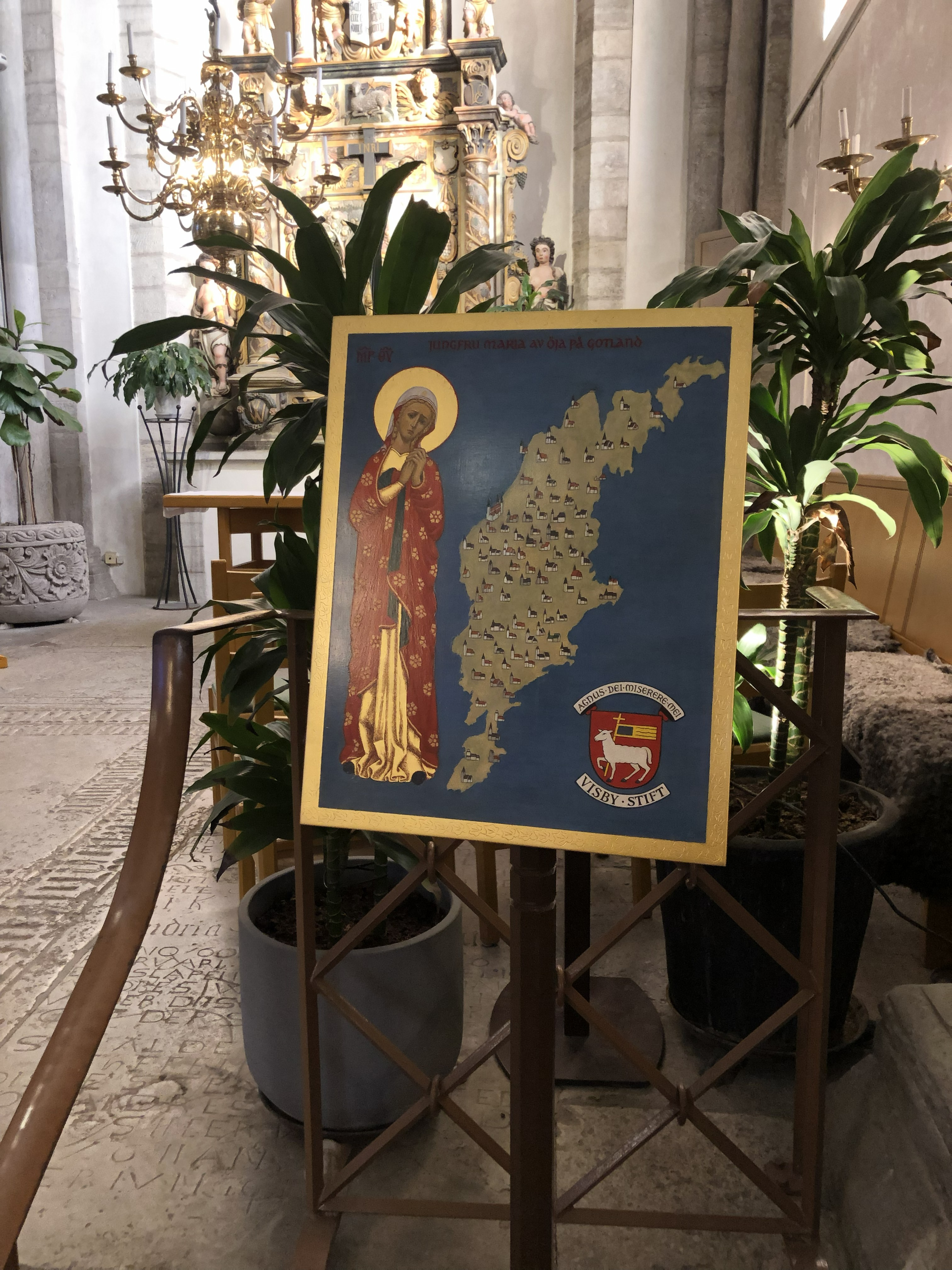
An Evangelical-Lutheran icon portraying Our Lady of Öja, associated with the Diocese of Visby of the Church of Sweden, on display in the Pilgrim's Chapel of Visby Saint Mary's Cathedral.

The Lutheran churches celebrate several Marian feast days, including the Feast of the Annunciation of the Blessed Virgin Mary, Feast of the Purification of the Blessed Virgin Mary, and the Visitation of the Blessed Virgin Mary.

A Marian Lutheran prayer titled 'Evangelical Praise of the Mother of God' was authored by Martin Luther:

O Blessed Virgin, Mother of God, what great comfort God has shown to us in you, by so graciously looking with favor on your unworthiness and humble state. By your example, we are encouraged to believe that He will not despise us poor and lowly ones, but graciously look with favor on us, as well. Amen.

Luther composed a number of venerational poems, which focus on Mary's virginity. He also translated old devotional Latin hymns on Mary into German. They express in various ways the incarnation of God through a virgin, as with the perpetual virginity of Mary:

The virgin body was pregnant, but she remained pure
Here comes the saviour of the gentiles
Divine grace from heaven came over the virgin and others.

The Lutheran views on the veneration of Mary were interpreted differently by different theologians over time. Key is his interpretation of the Magnificat of Mary, which to some is a relic of the Catholic past, but to others a clear indication that he maintained a Marian piety. Luther states in his Magnificat that one should pray to Mary, so God would give and do, through her will, what we ask. However, Luther's statement reflects his transitional theology at the time. He did not entirely reject the concept of asking for Mary's intercession early in his career. Later in his life, Luther clarified his position and strongly opposed the idea of praying to Mary or the saints, asserting that prayer should be directed to God alone through Jesus Christ. His mature theology rested on the belief in solus Christus—Christ as the only mediator. An important indicator of Luther's views on the veneration of Mary are not only his writings but also approved practices of Lutherans during his lifetime. The singing of the Magnificat in Latin was maintained in many German Lutheran communities. The Church Order (Kirchenordnung) of Brandenburg, Bugenhagen Braunschweig and other cities and districts decreed by the royal heads of the Lutheran Church maintained three Marian feast days to be observed as public holidays. It is known that Martin Luther approved of this. He also approved of keeping Marian paintings and statues in the churches (cf. Lutheran art). He also advocated the use of the pre-Trent version of the Hail Mary (that is, "Hail Mary, full of grace, the Lord is with thee. Blessed art thou among women and blessed is the fruit of thy womb, Jesus.") as a sign of reverence for and devotion to the Blessed Virgin. The 1522 Betbüchlein (Prayer Book) retained the Ave Maria.

The 'Evangelical Praise of the Mother of God' prayer and the pre-Trent 'Hail Mary' prayer are used by certain Lutherans who pray a form of the rosary.

== Comparison to Roman Catholic and Reformed views ==
Luther came to criticize Roman Catholics for blurring the distinction between high admiration of the grace of God wherever it is manifested in human beings and religious service offered to them and other mere creatures. In some instances he considered the Roman Catholic practice of making intercessory requests addressed especially to Mary and other departed saints to be idolatry.

Furthermore, how will you endure [the Romanists'] terrible idolatries? It was not enough that they venerated the saints and praised God in them, but they actually made them into gods. They put that noble child, the mother Mary, right into the place of Christ. They fashioned Christ into a judge and thus devised a tyrant for anguished consciences, so that all comfort and confidence was transferred from Christ to Mary, and then everyone turned from Christ to his particular saint. Can anyone deny this? Is it not true?

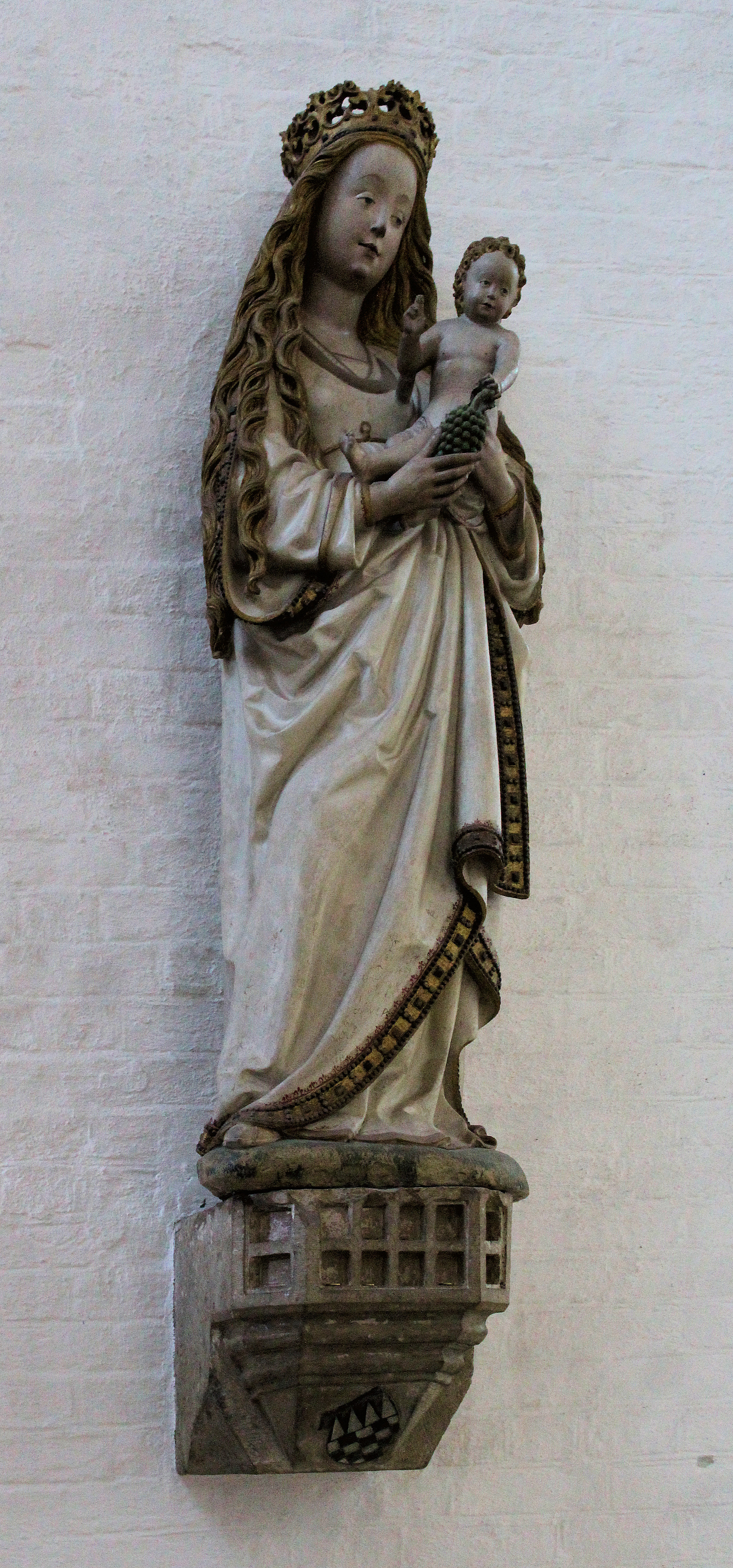
Statue of the Virgin Mary in the Lutheran Cathedral of Lübeck, Germany.

This distinction separates Lutheran views from Roman Catholic Mariology. It is also significant in the context of Roman Catholic claims that modern Protestants deserted Luther's Mariology. Roman Catholics and Protestants may have held some similar views on Mary in the 16th century, but for Luther it was a "passive" Mariology, while for Roman Catholics it was "active" in suggesting devout veneration ("hyperdulia") and constant prayers for intercession. Questions have been raised as to whether the Marian views of Martin Luther could bring separated Christians closer together. There seems to be scepticism on both sides. The eighth "Lutherans and Catholics in Dialogue" addressed these issues.

Throughout Luther's life, he called Mary by the title Theotokos, Mother of God. Martin Luther as well as Martin Chemnitz, "the other Martin" of early Lutheranism, are said to have prayed the pre-Trent Hail Mary, and very likely other suddenly-ex-Catholic Lutheran priests who were contemporaries of the two Martins likewise did. In the present-day, many Lutheran synods usually reject or at least do not actively recommend the practice of directly addressing Mary and other saints in prayers of admiration or petition as part of their religious worship of God. Other Lutheran denominations (particularly those of Evangelical Catholic churchmanship), such as the Lutheran Orthodox Church, and congregations in various Lutheran synods encourage Marian Lutheran prayers such as the pre-Trent Hail Mary, or the Evangelical Praise of the Mother of God.

Lutherans defended various Marian doctrines, such as the perpetual virginity of Mary, in order to distinguish and distance themselves from the Reformed (Calvinists). When a Reformed preacher came to Saint Bartholomew's Lutheran Church in 1589 and preached against images, the Lutheran Church Fathers responded by placing a statue of the Virgin Mary on the high altar of the church, causing the preacher to retire to a quieter parish. In general, Calvinist iconoclasm "provoked reactive riots by Lutheran mobs" in Germany and "antagonized the neighbouring Eastern Orthodox" in the Baltic region. At Saint Marien Church in Danzig, Lutheran clergy retained sacred artwork depicting the Coronation of the Virgin Mary and lit candles beside it during the period of Calvinist dominance in the region.

=== Views of Martin Luther on various doctrines ===
==== Immaculate Conception ====
In 1532, Luther said: 'God has formed the soul and body of the Virgin Mary full of the Holy Spirit, so that she is without all sins, for she has conceived and borne the Lord Jesus.' When concentrating specifically on Mary herself as the Mother of God, Luther acknowledges God's singular action in bringing her into the world, but in making general comments about the universality of human sinfulness, he includes her among all the rest of humanity.

Mother Mary, like us, was born in sin of sinful parents, but the Holy Spirit covered her, sanctified and purified her so that this child was born of flesh and blood, but not with sinful flesh and blood. The Holy Spirit permitted the Virgin Mary to remain a true, natural human being of flesh and blood, just as we. However, he warded off sin from her flesh and blood so that she became the mother of a pure child, not poisoned by sin as we are. For in that moment when she conceived, she was a holy mother filled with the Holy Spirit and her fruit is a holy pure fruit, at once God and truly man, in one person.

The Book of Concord does not mention the Immaculate Conception.

==== Queen of Heaven ====
In his earlier years, Luther referred to Mary as the "Queen of Heaven", but he warned against people using the term too much. Luther later rejected this title due to its lack of scriptural evidence and the fact that he felt that Mary's accomplishments should be ultimately attributed to Christ.

==== Mediatrix ====
Before 1516, Luther's belief that Mary is a mediatrix between God and humanity was driven by his fear of Jesus being the implacable judge of all people. "The Virgin Mary remains in the middle between Christ and humankind. For in the very moment he was conceived and lived, he was full of grace. All other human beings are without grace, both in the first and second conception. But the Virgin Mary, though without grace in the first conception, was full of grace in the second ... whereas other human beings are conceived in sin, in soul as well as in body, and Christ was conceived without sin in soul as well as in body, the Virgin Mary was conceived in body without grace but in soul full of grace."

Luther later rejected the stance of Mary as a mediator between Christ and humanity. Luther claimed that though Mary possessed many virtues, she could not intercede for sinners. He claimed that the evidence for Mary's powers as a mediatrix was a result of improper translation of the Annunciation. Instead, Luther believed that Mary's lack of power to intercede is seen in her praising God and his blessings, not in taking credit for herself.

== Gallery ==
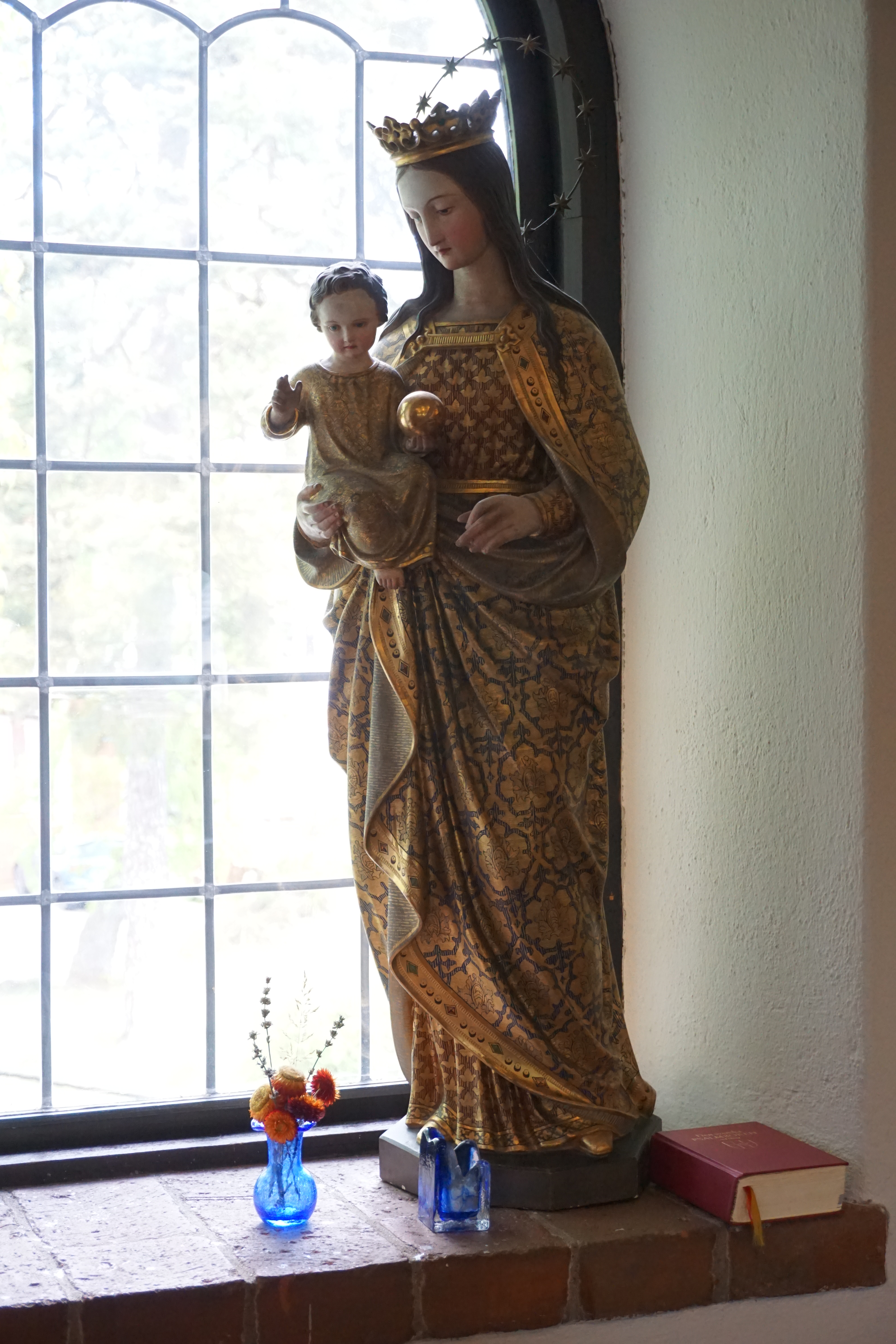
An Evangelical-Lutheran statue of the Blessed Virgin Mary at Enskede Church in Stockholm

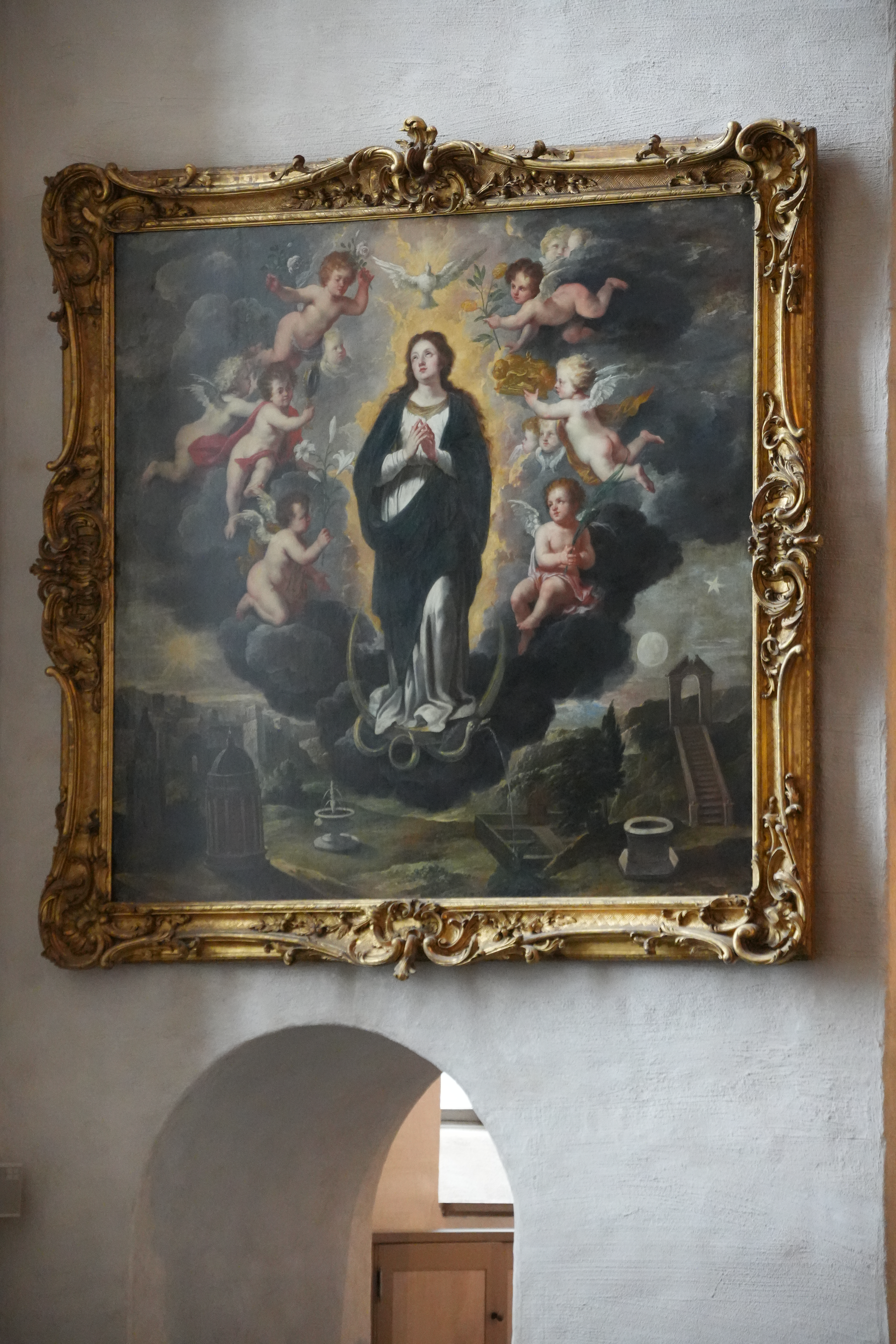
A painting of the Assumption of Blessed Virgin Mary at Högalid Evangelical-Lutheran Church in Södermalm, Sweden

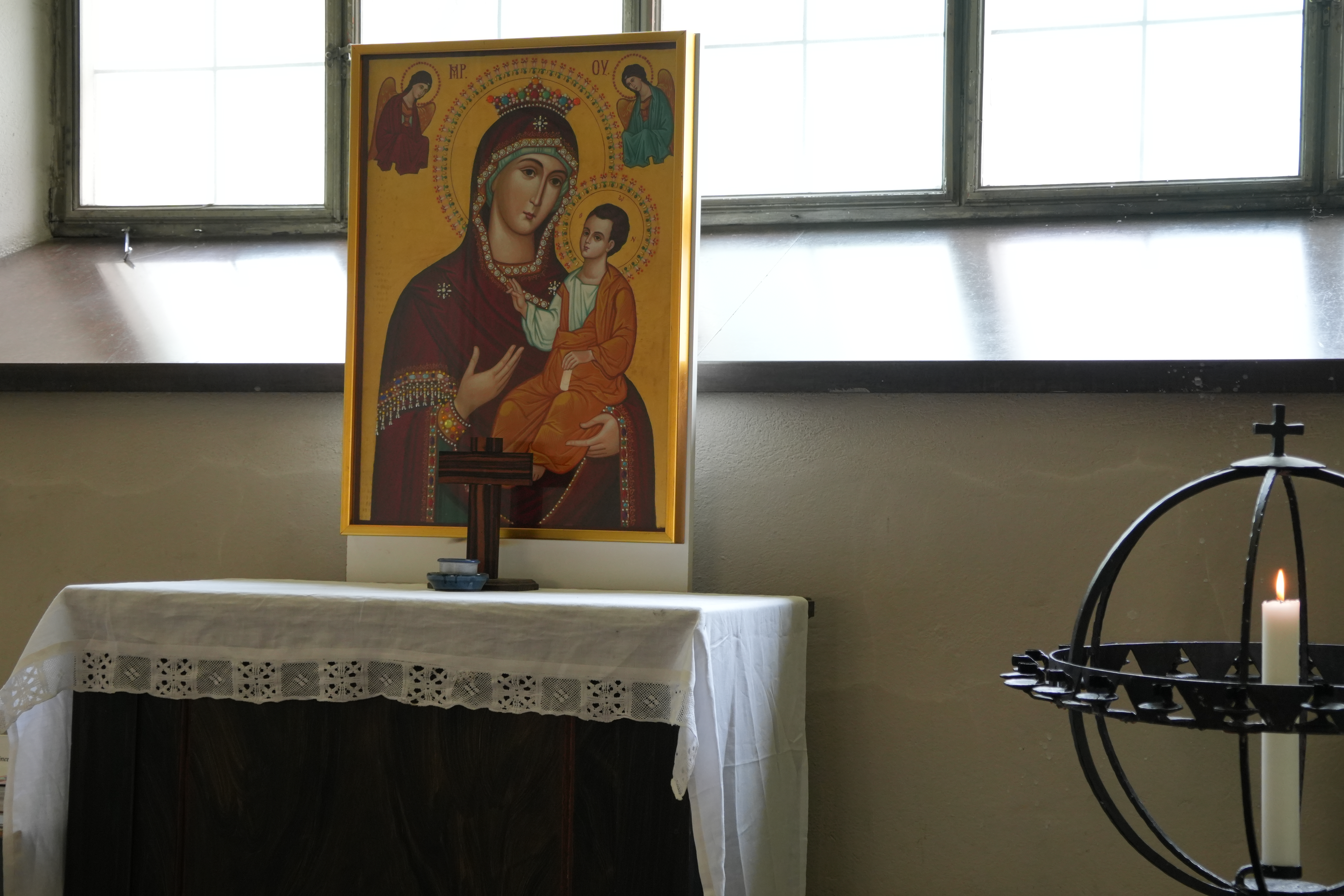
An icon of the Madonna and Child with a votive candle rack at St. Matthew's Church (Evangelical-Lutheran) in Stockholm

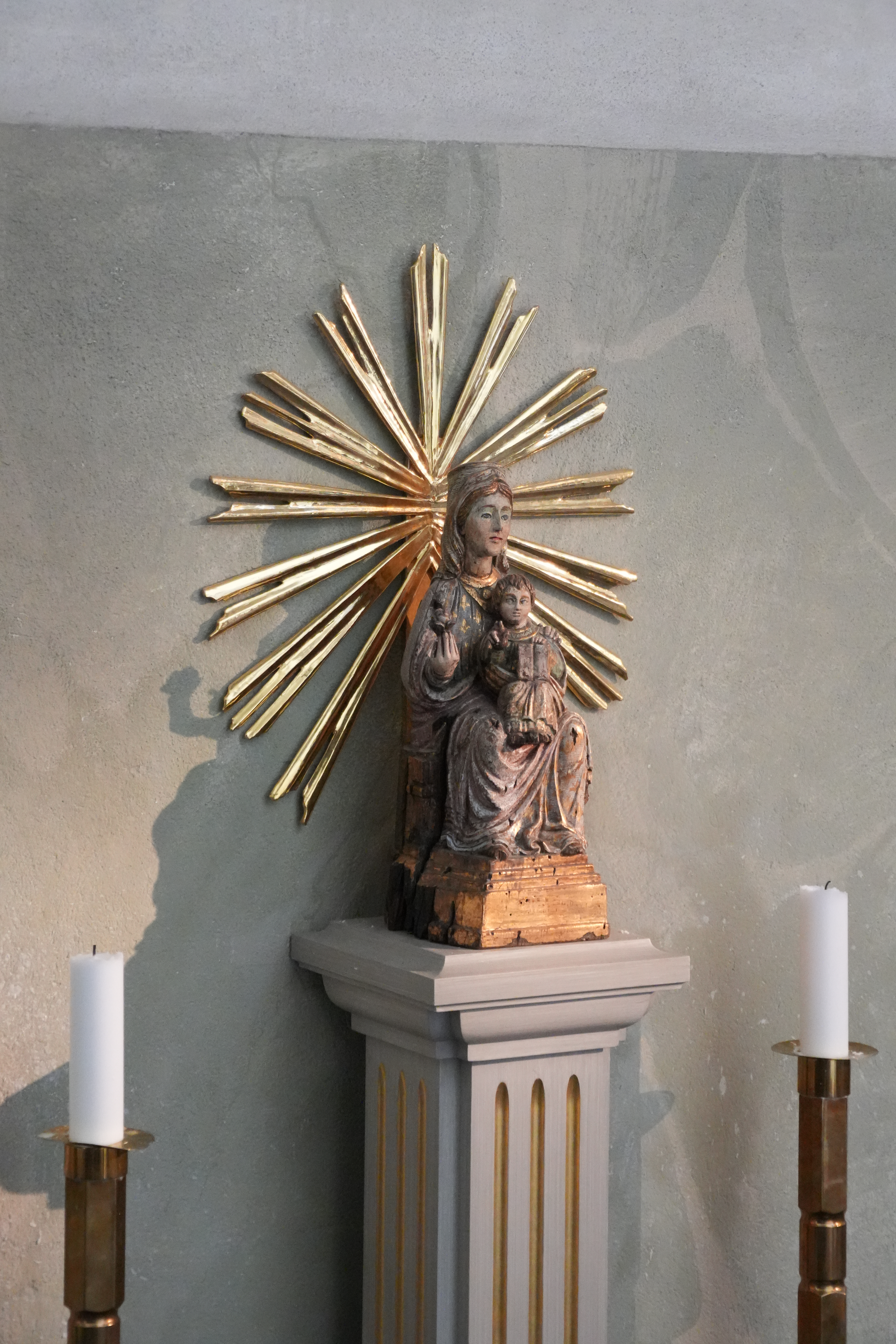
An Evangelical-Lutheran statue of the Blessed Virgin Mary at a side altar in Hedvig Eleonora Church in Stockholm

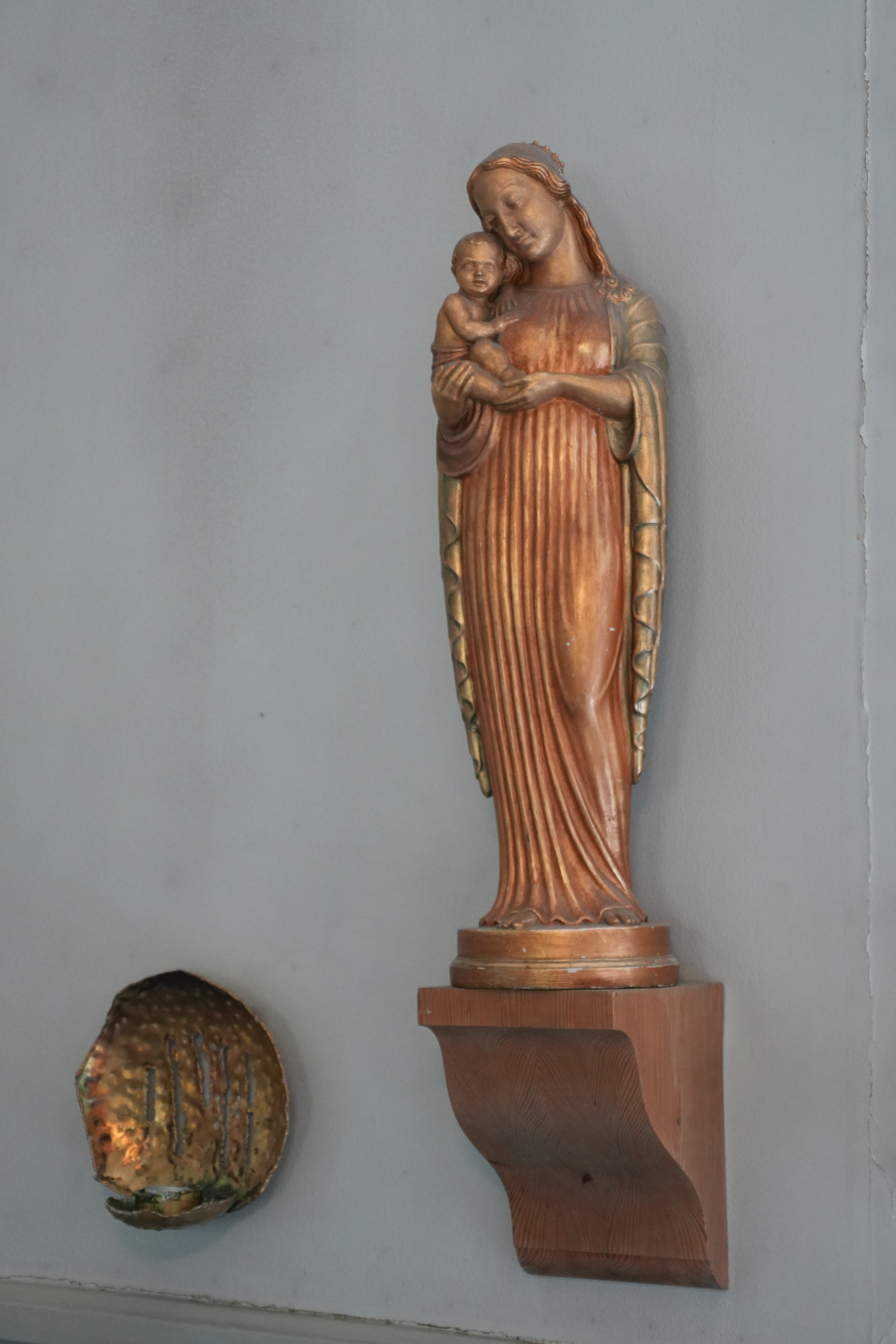
An Evangelical-Lutheran statue of the Blessed Virgin Mary in Djurgård Church in Stockholm

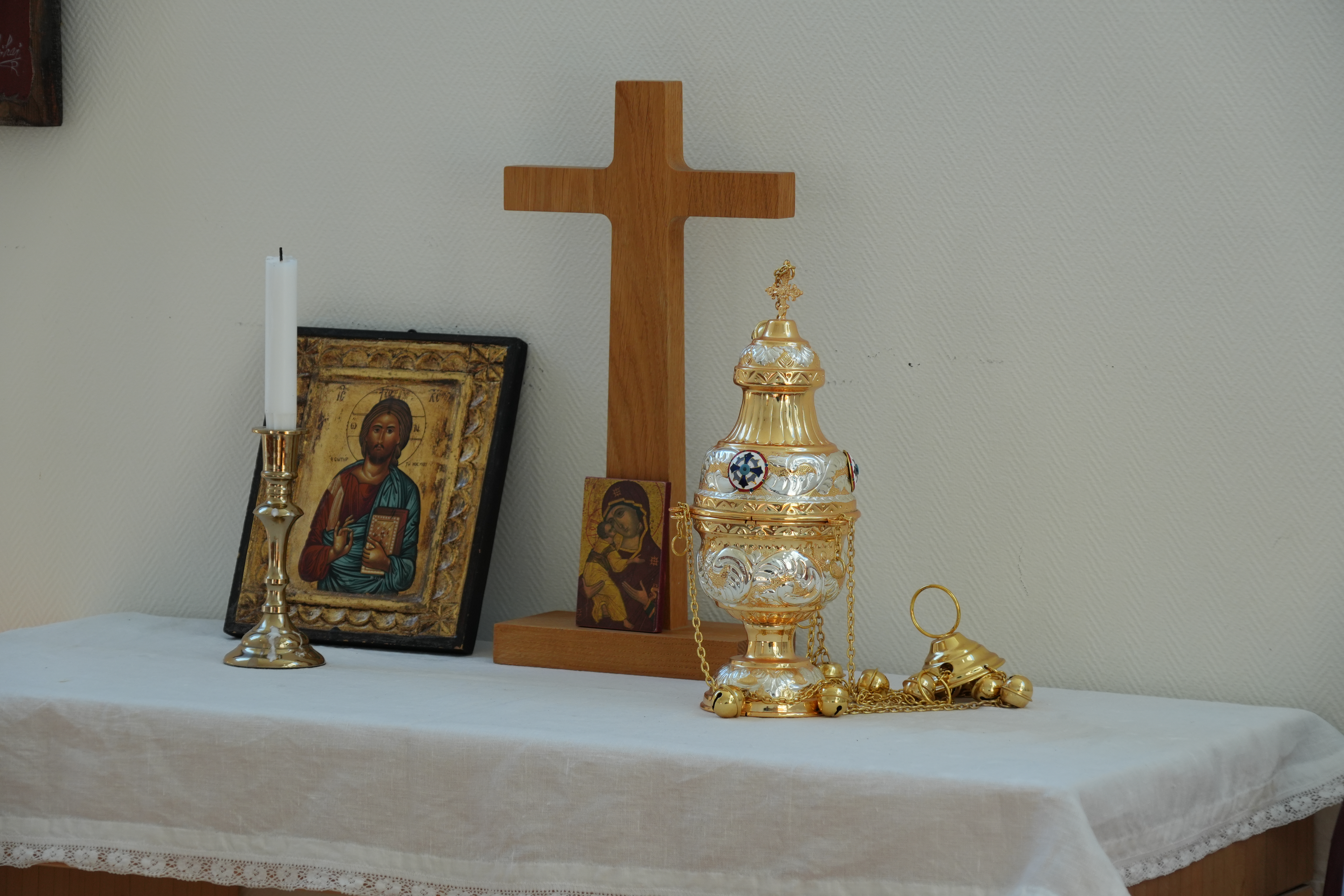
An icon of the Blessed Virgin Mary sits at the base of the altar cross of the Lady Chapel of Norrtälje Church, Sweden

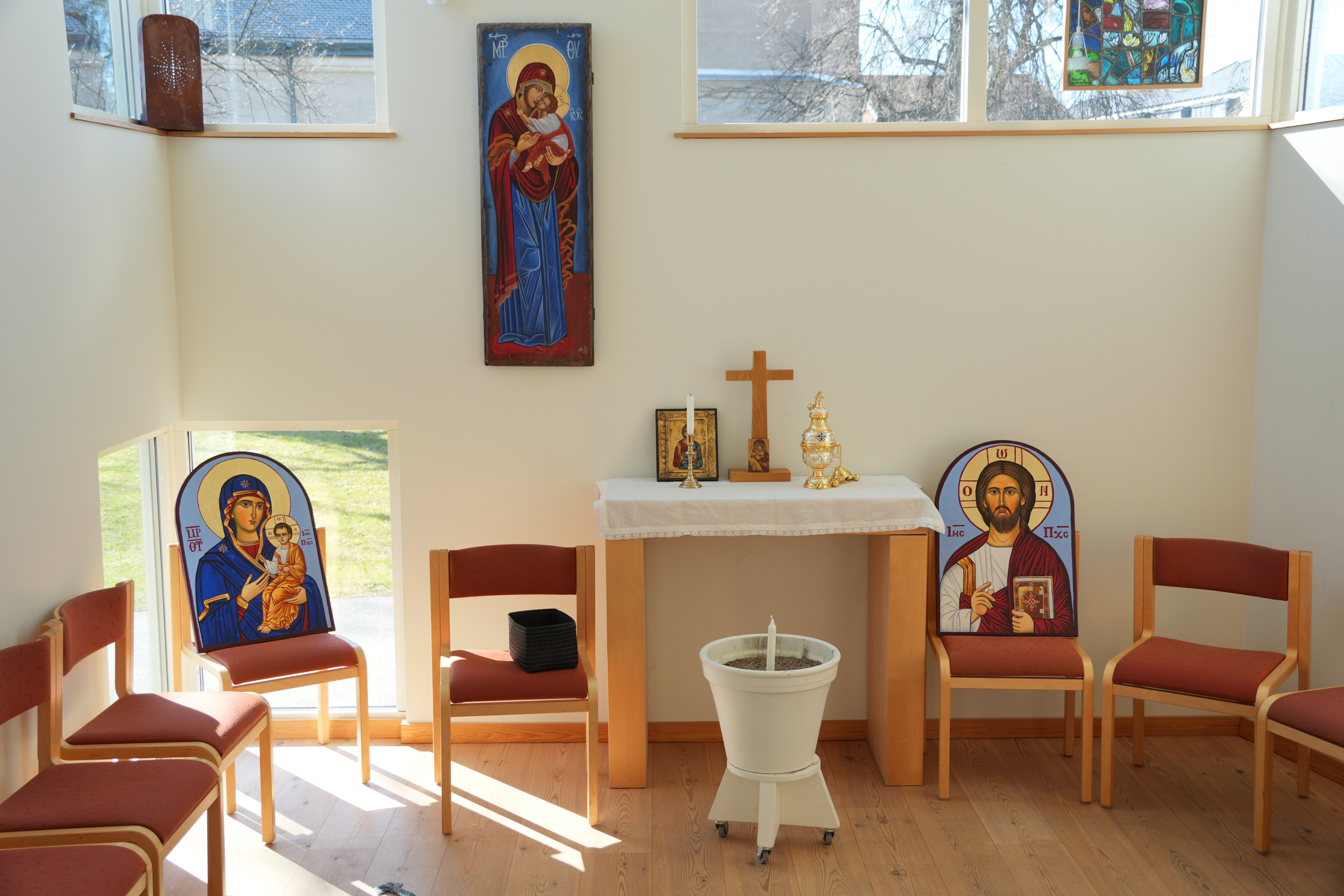
An Evangelical-Lutheran icon of the Blessed Virgin Mary in the Lady Chapel of Norrtälje Church, Sweden

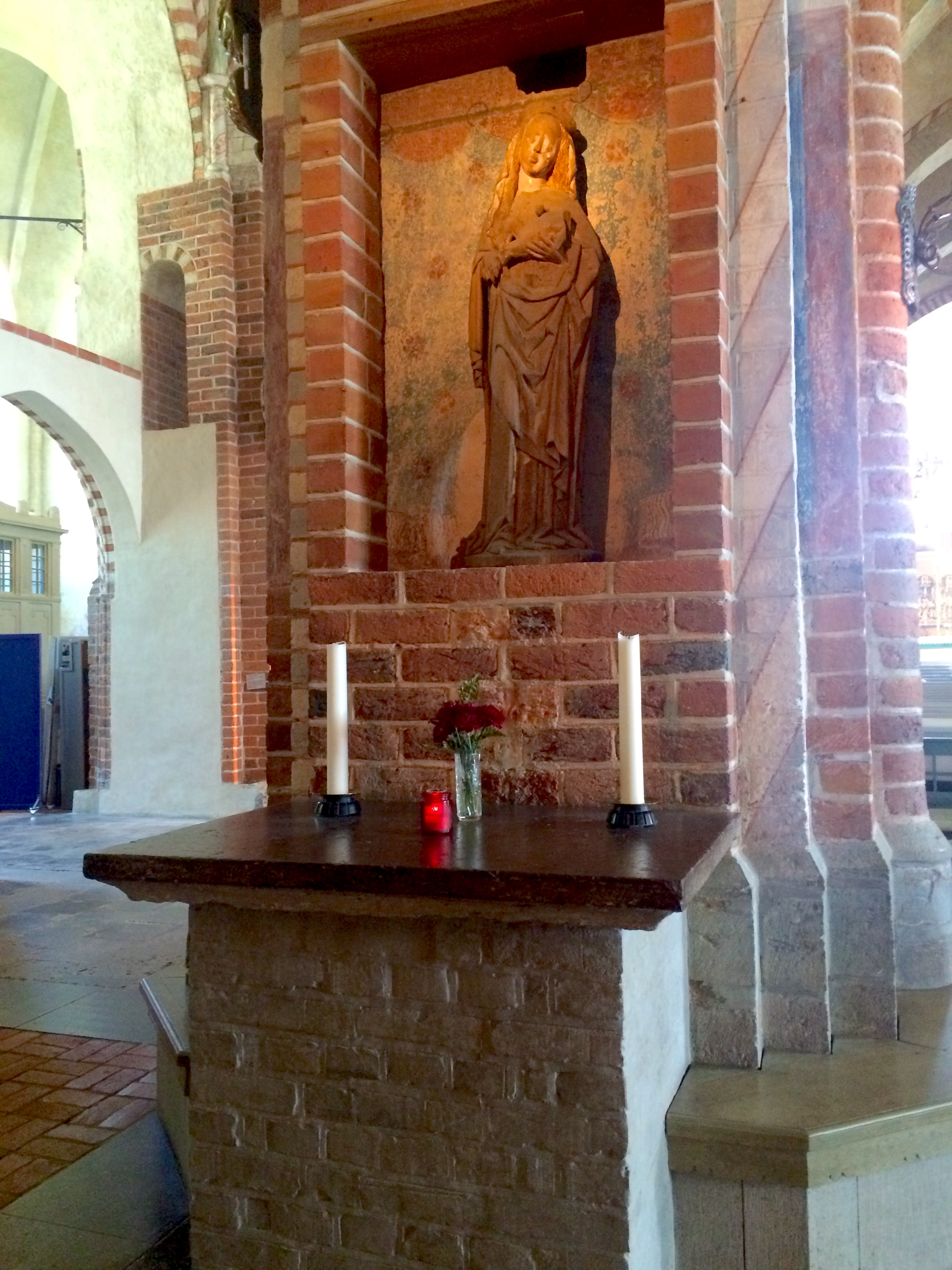
A bye-altar dedicated to the Blessed Virgin Mary in the Evangelical-Lutheran Strängnäs Cathedral, Sweden

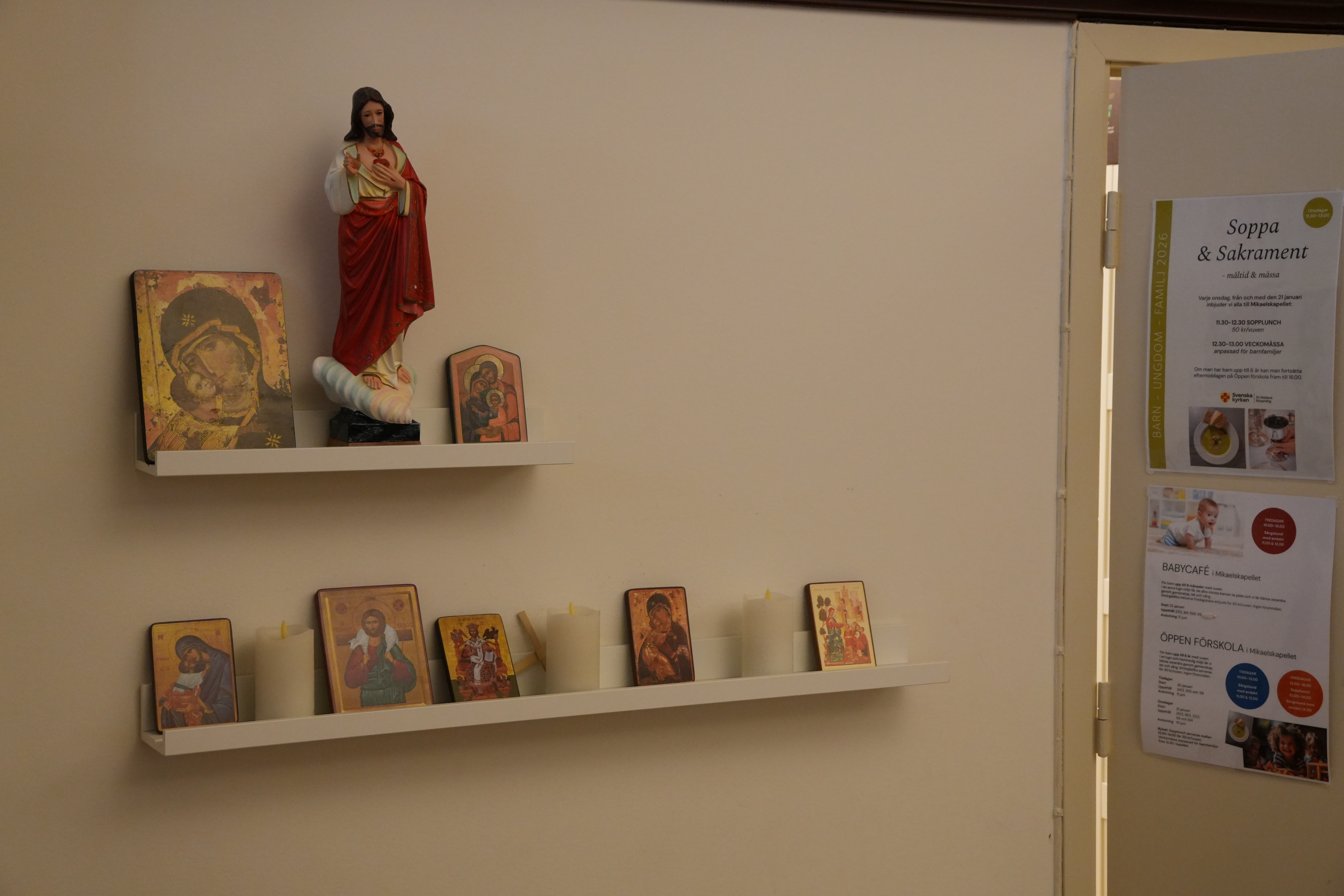
Icons adorn the wall of Saint Michael's Hall at St. Michael's Chapel (Evangelical-Lutheran) in Stockholm, Sweden

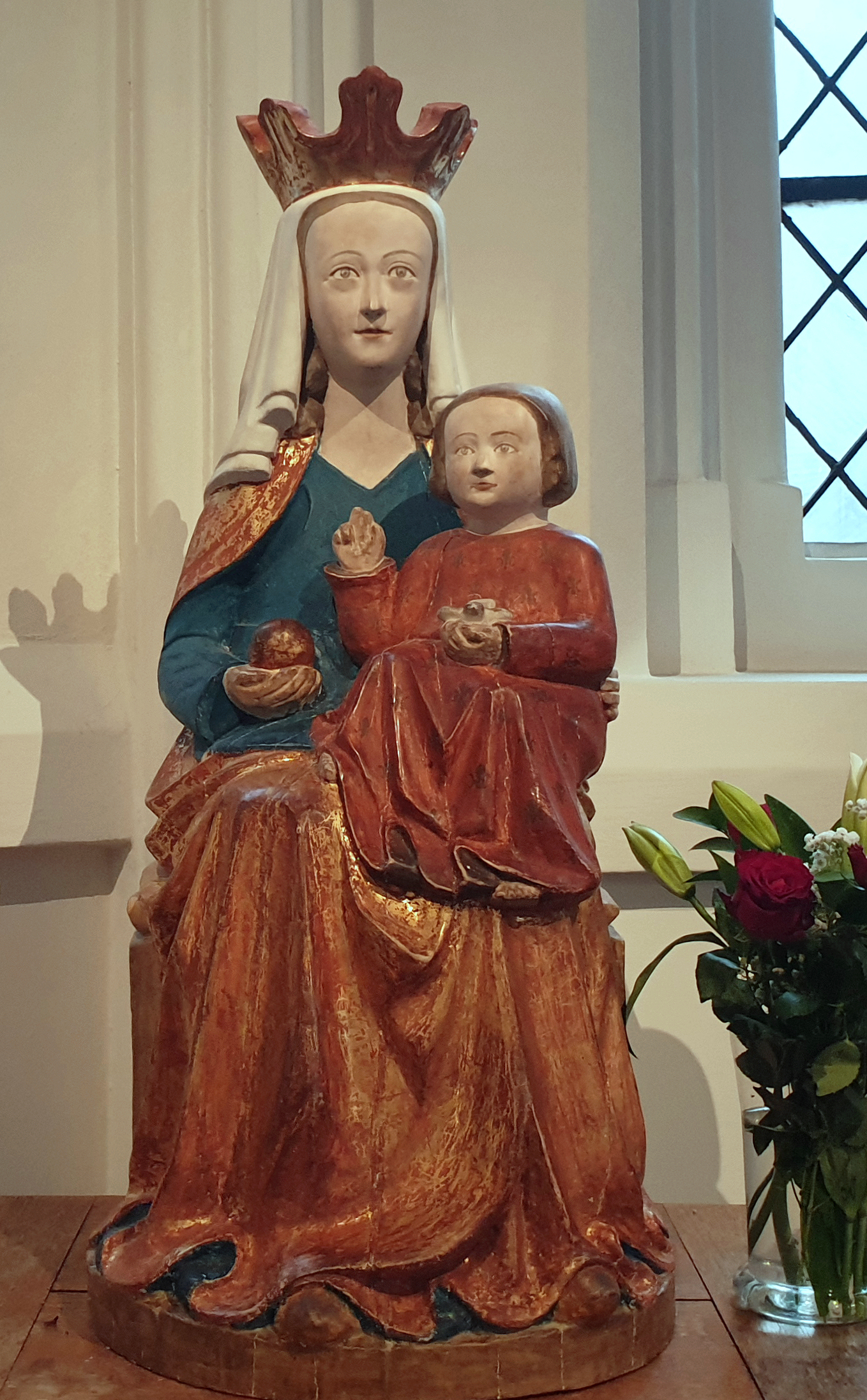
Evangelical-Lutheran statue of the Madonna and Child at St. Peter's Church, Malmö

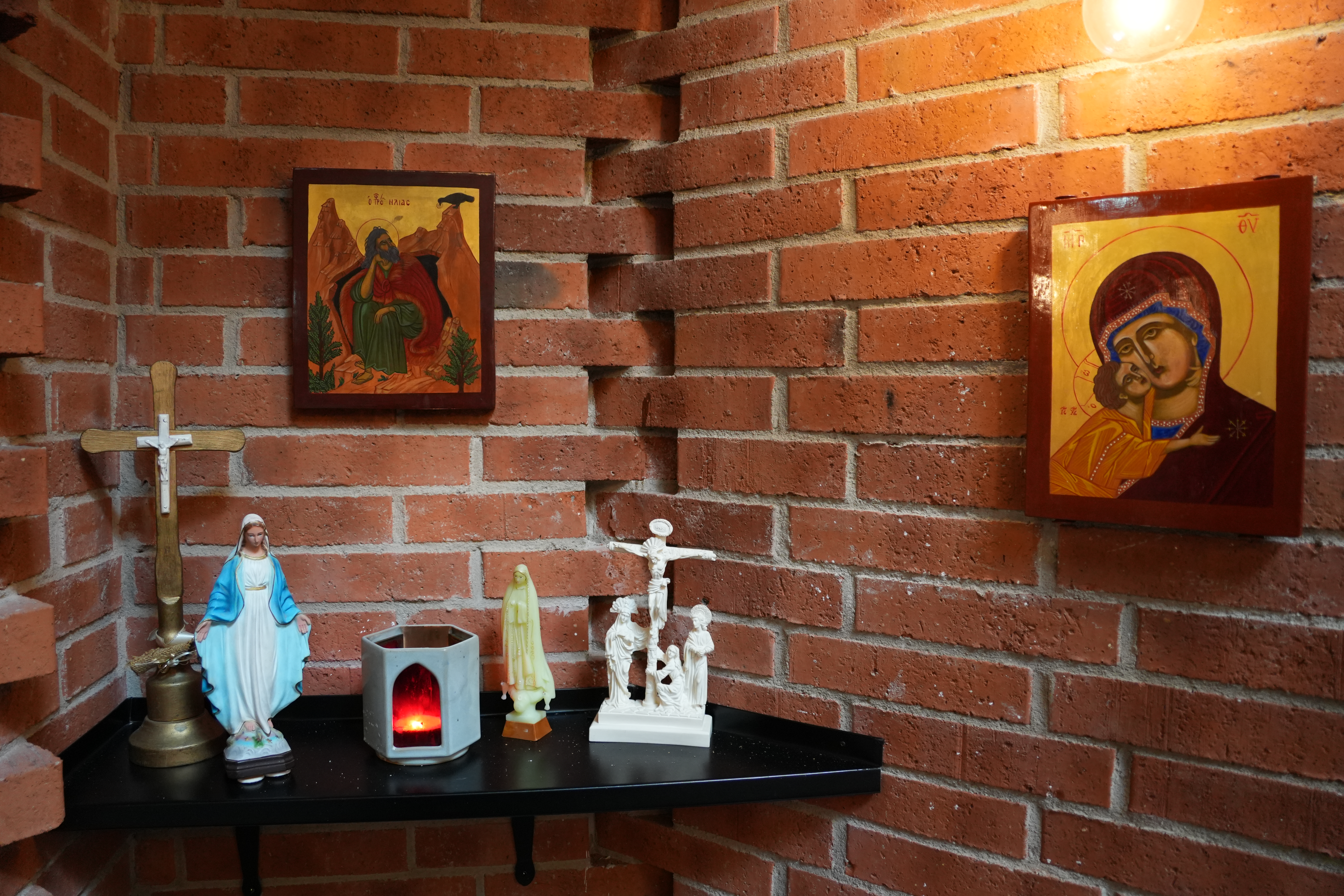
Icons and statues of the Blessed Virgin Mary at Kista Kyrka (Evangelical-Lutheran) in Stockholm

A statue depicting the Madonna and Child in Katarina Church (Evangelical-Lutheran) in Stockholm, Sweden

A statue of the Blessed Virgin Mary at Norra Nöbbelövs Church in Skåne

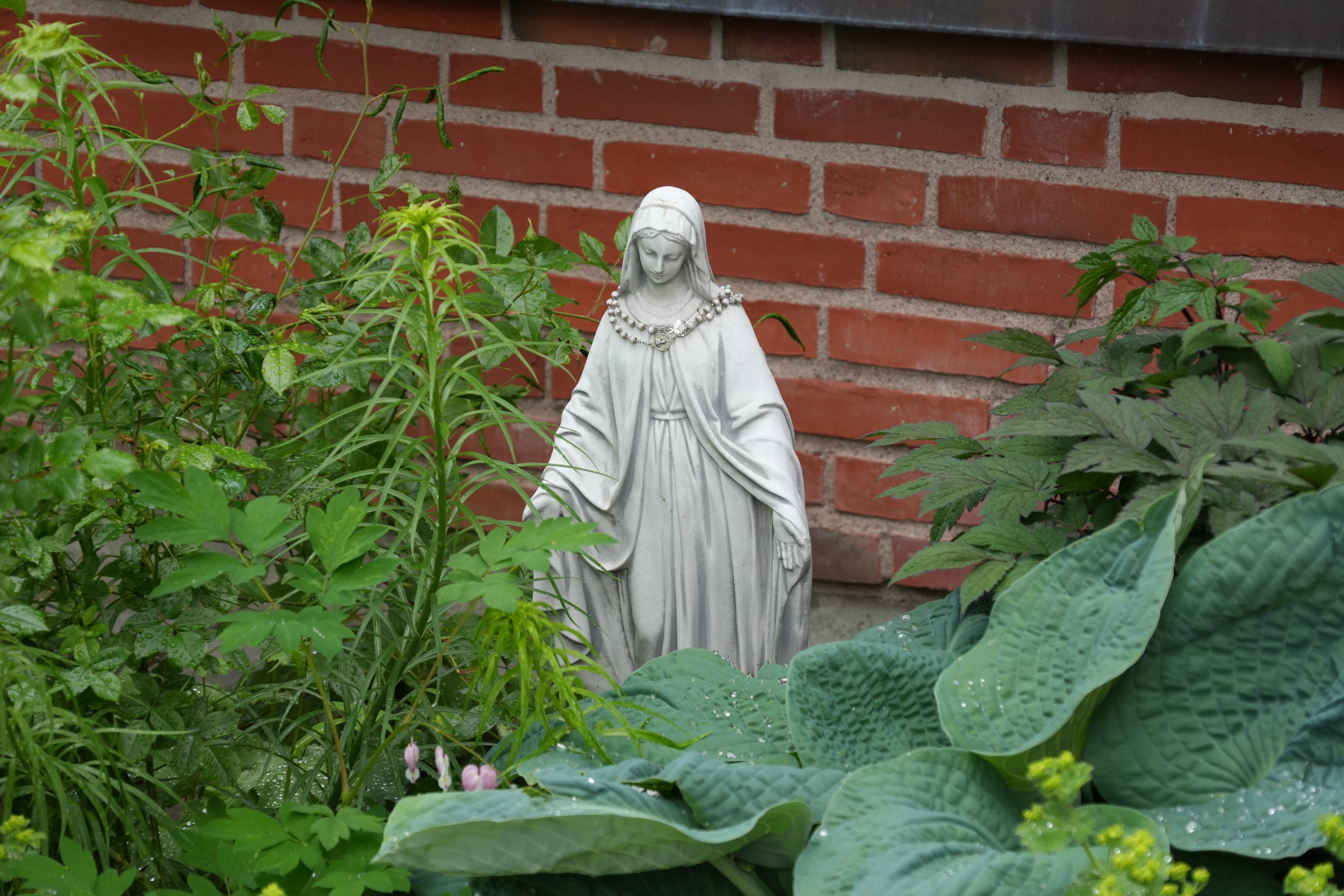
The Mary garden of Kummelby Kyrka (Evangelical-Lutheran) in Sollentuna Municipality

A modern Evangelical-Lutheran icon of the Blessed Virgin Mary at Tureberg Church in Sollentuna, Sweden

A modern Evangelical-Lutheran icon of the Blessed Virgin Mary at Tureberg Church in Sollentuna, Sweden

A statue of the Blessed Virgin Mary at Gustaf Adolf Church (Evangelical-Lutheran) in Östermalm, Sweden

A prayer corner with icons and votive candles in Saint Michael's Chapel, located in the Evangelical-Lutheran parish of St. Matthew's Church, Stockholm

A statue of the Blessed Virgin Mary on the altar of Fru Alstad Church (Evangelical-Lutheran) in Scania

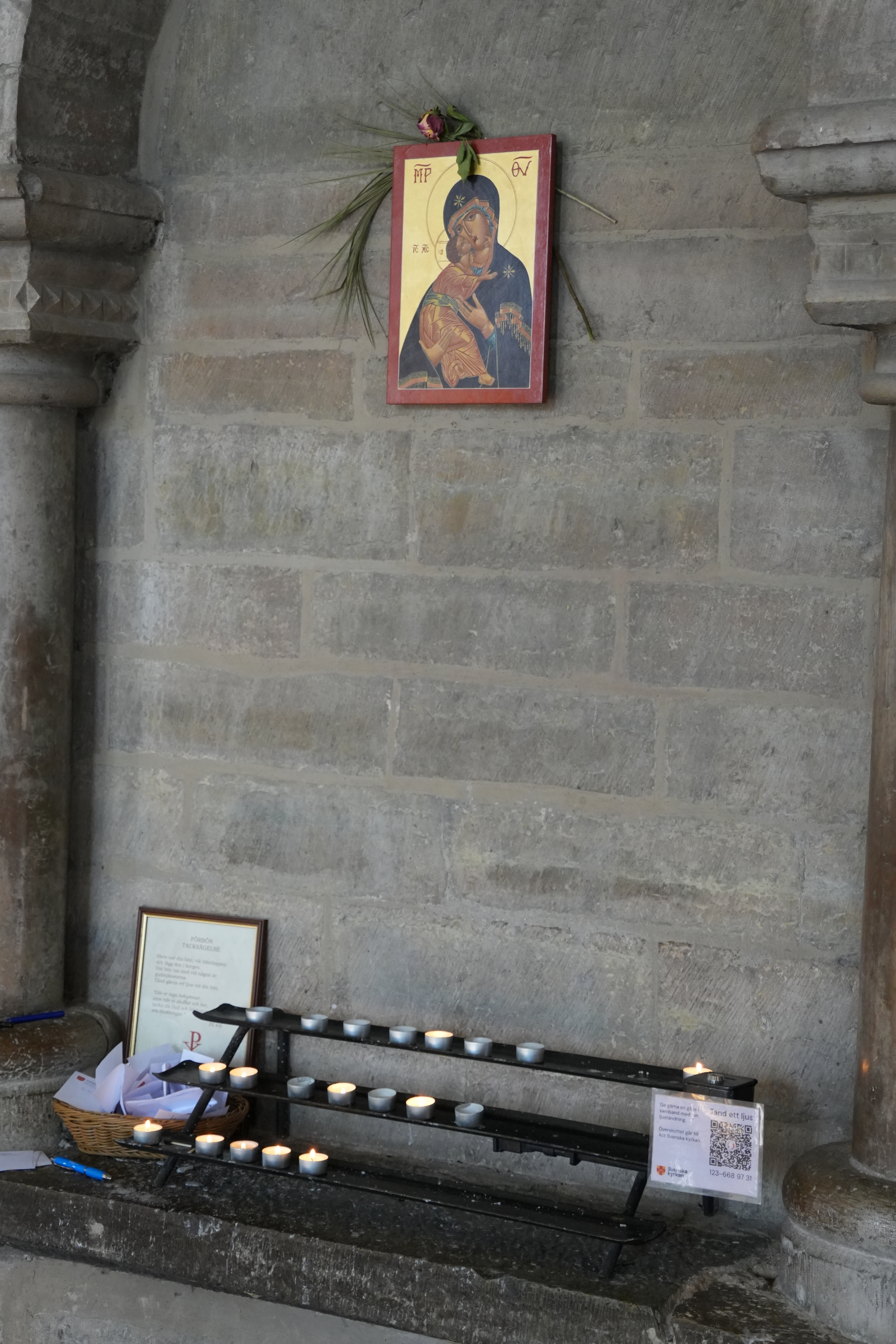
An icon of the Blessed Virgin Mary with votive candle rack in Linköping Cathedral (Evangelical Lutheran) in Sweden

A statue of the Blessed Virgin Mary in Omberg, Sweden

Two statues and one gonfalon depicting Saint Mary, in the Saint Anne Chapel in Hedemora Church (Evangelical Lutheran), Sweden.

== See also ==
- John Calvin's views on Mary
- Mariology of Petrus Canisius
- Marian doctrines of the Roman Catholic Church
- History of Roman Catholic Mariology
- Ecumenical meetings and documents on Mary

== Sources ==
- Anderson, H. George; Stafford, J. Francis; Burgess, Joseph A., eds. (1992). The One Mediator, The Saints, and Mary. Lutherans and Catholics in Dialogue. Vol. VIII. Minneapolis: Augsburg. ISBN 0-8066-2579-1.
- Bäumer, Remigius (1994). Leo Scheffczyk (ed.). Marienlexikon (Gesamtausgabe ed.). Regensburg: Institutum Marianum.
- Brecht, Martin (1985). His Road to Reformation, 1483–1521. Martin Luther. Vol. 1. Translated by James Schaaf. Philadelphia: Fortress Press. ISBN 978-0-8006-2813-0.
- Dhalenne, Abbé Lucien (1954). "Antichristian Mariology" (PDF). Lutherischer Rundblick. wlsessays.net. Translated by Heinrich Vogel.
- Düfel, H. (1968). Luthers Stellung zur Marienverehrung [Luther's Position on the Adoration of Mary] (in German). Göttingen.
- Grisar, Hartmann (1915). Luigi Cappadelta (ed.). Martin Luther. Translated by E. M. Lamond. St. Louis: B. Herder.
- Gritsch, Eric W. (1992). "The views of Luther and Lutheranism on the veneration of Mary". In H. George Anderson; J. Francis Stafford; Joseph A. Burgess (eds.). The One Mediator, The Saints, and Mary. Lutherans and Roman Catholic in Dialogue. Vol. VIII. Minneapolis: Augsburg Fortress. ISBN 978-0-8066-2579-9.
- Jackson, Gregory (2007). Catholic, Lutheran, Protestant (PDF). Glendale, Arizona: Martin Chemnitz Press. ISBN 978-0-6151-6635-3.
- Luther, Martin (1996). John Nicholas Lenker (ed.). Sermons of Martin Luther. Grand Rapids, MI: Baker Book House.
- Pieper, Francis (1950). Christian Dogmatics. Vol. 2. St. Louis: CPH.
- Tappert, Theodore G. (1959). The Book of Concord: the Confessions of the Evangelical Lutheran Church. Philadelphia: Fortress Press.
- White, James R. (1998). Mary – Another Redeemer?. Minneapolis: Bethany House Publishers. ISBN 978-0-764-22102-6.
- Wright, David, ed. (1989). Chosen By God: Mary in Evangelical Perspective. London: Marshall Pickering. ISBN 978-0-551-01878-5.
