= Giovanni Miegge =

Italian theologian (1900–1961)

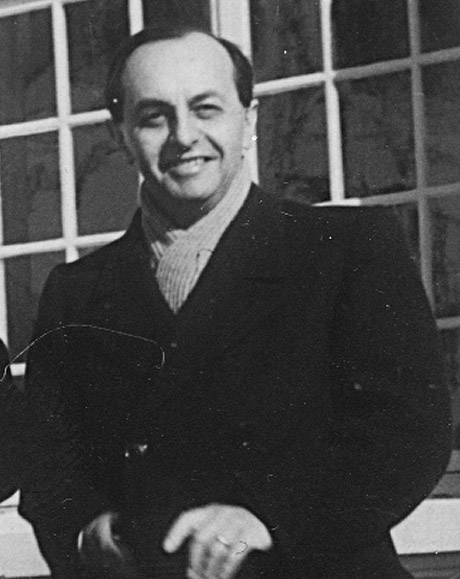
Giovanni Miegge

Giovanni Miegge (1900–1961) was an Italian Protestant theologian and author on religious issues. He was professor of theology at the Waldensian school of theology (Facoltà valdese di teologia) in Rome, Italy.

Miegge supported neo-orthodoxy, and promoted the ideas of Karl Barth in Italy, and translated Barth's work on the Epistle to the Romans. Miegge wrote many books, including a biography of Martin Luther published in 1946.

He also wrote the book The Virgin Mary which analyzed Marian teachings from Catholic and Protestant perspectives.

== Books about Miegge ==
- Giovanni Miegge: teologo e pastore (in Italian ) by Sara Saccomani, Claudiana Publishers, 2002

== Books by Miegge ==
- Karl Barth: Epistle to the Romans, Feltrinelli, Milano 1968,
- Luther: the Man and his thoughts (1483-1521), Claudiana, Torino 1946, 2003.
- The Virgin Mary, Claudiana, Torino 1950
- Visible and Invisible:Christian Affirmations in a Secular Age, Translated by Stephen Neill, A.R. Mowbray, London, 1958
- Gospel and Myth in the thought of Rudolf Bultmann, Translated by Stephen Neill, Lutterworth Press, London, 1960
