= Mary ever virgin =

Mary ever virgin may refer to:

- Perpetual virginity of Mary
- Mary (mother of Jesus)

== See also ==
- Aeiparthenos
- Virgin Mary (disambiguation)
