= The Virgin Mary (book) =

Book by Giovanni Miegge

First edition (publ. Claudiana)

The Virgin Mary: The Roman Catholic Marian Doctrine is the English title of Italian Protestant theologian Giovanni Miegge's 1950 work La vergine Maria: Saggio di storia del dogma. In the original Italian language it has gone through four printings, the most recent in 2008.

== Overview ==
The book presents, in chronological order, the development of Roman Catholic Mariology. It is primarily a critique from a Protestant viewpoint of Gabriel Roschini's 1947–8 Mariologia. It touches on a variety of doctrinal points, including the idea of the perpetual virginity of Mary, then turns to the uses of terms referring to Mary, including "Mother of God" and "Queen of Heaven". Georges A. Barrois of Princeton Theological Seminary sees it as an attempt to find out the time and place when Roman Catholic doctrine "became inconsistent with the spirit or with the patterns of thought of original Christianity".

== Translations ==
The book was translated into English by Waldo Smith, with an added foreword by John A. Mackay, and published in 1956 by Westminster Press. Reviewers present differing viewpoints on the quality of Smith's translation. Robert M. Grant of the University of Chicago praised it, with the exception of minor errors such as the plural "apocrypha" where singular "apocryphon" should be used instead, and referring to the Society of Jesus as the "Company of Jesus". However, Eamon Carroll of The Catholic University of America was much more critical, describing it as "full of failures to express the sense of the Italian at all". In particular he criticises a passage in which a declarative statement of Saint Leo the Great (Pope Leo I) was made into an interrogative in translation, completely inverting the meaning, and the frequent mistranslations by way of false friends.

The French translation, by Jacqueline Tadjer-Orenpo, was published in 1961.

== Reviews ==
Miegge comes in for criticism from Barrois for his scriptural exegesis, particularly in his interpretation of Mark 3: 31–35 and John 19: 25–27, where he states that Mary is "rebuked" by Jesus. Similarly, Miegge argues that Roman Catholic theologians "read too much" into the words of the angel Gabriel to Mary in Luke 1: 28 (the Annunciation), an assessment with which Barrois agrees; however, Barrois also states that Miegge seems to put too little weight on these words. Carroll, himself a Catholic who admits that he is disposed to disagree with Miegge's analysis, praises the clarity with which Miegge analyses Catholic and Protestant differences in their conception of Christianity, but evaluated his description of Catholic Marian belief and practise as "often far removed from reality". It was also reviewed in the International Review of Mission and The New York Times.

== Editions ==
- Miegge, Giovanni (1950), La Vergine Maria: saggio di storia del dogma, Torre Pellice, Editrice claudiana, OCLC 18791115.
  - Second edition 1959. OCLC 163787944.
  - Third edition 1982, with preface by Alfredo Sonelli. OCLC 158206174.
- Miegge, Giovanni; Smith, Waldo Edward Lovel (1955), The Virgin Mary: The Roman Catholic Marian Doctrine, Philadelphia: Westminster Press, OCLC 1670180.
- Miegge, Giovanni; Smith, Waldo Edward Lovel (1955), The Virgin Mary: The Roman Catholic Marian Doctrine, London: Lutterworth Press, OCLC 1033052.
- Miegge, Giovanni; Tadjer-Orenpo, Jacqueline (1961), La Vierge Marie, Bergers et les mages, Paris: Librairie Protestante, OCLC 422114697.
- Miegge, Giovanni; Siege, Kurt-Victor (1962), Die Jungfrau Maria: Studie zur Geschichte der Marienlehre, Kirche und Konfession, Göttingen, Vandenhoeck & Ruprecht, OCLC 5731744.
