= Virgin Mary (El Greco, Madrid) =

1597 painting by El Greco

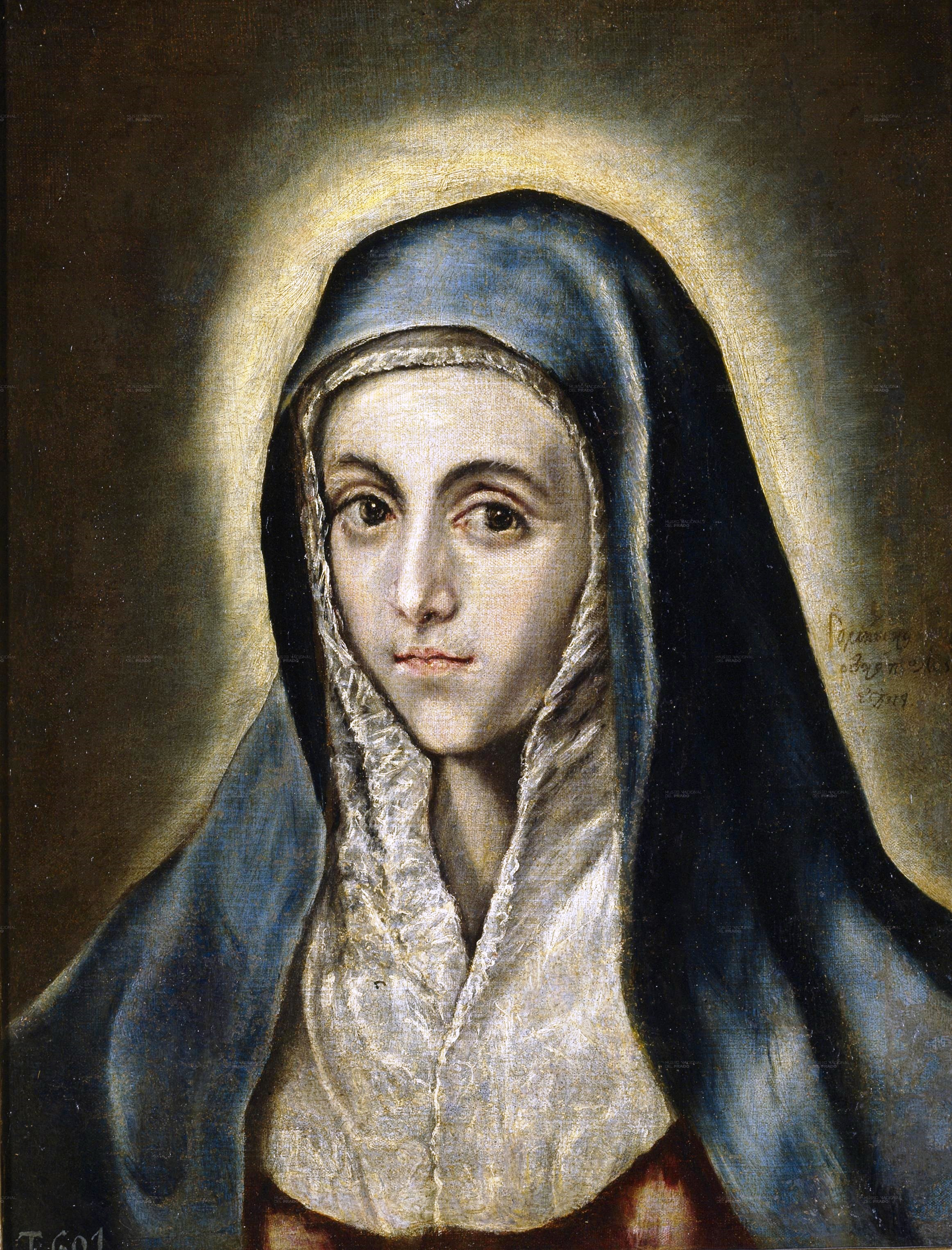
- Artist: El Greco
- Year: 1597
- Dimensions: 52 cm × 41 cm (20 in × 16 in)
- Location: Museo del Prado, Madrid

Virgin Mary, or Mater Dolorosa, is a 1597 oil on canvas painting by El Greco, now in the Museo del Prado in Madrid. It is considered as a weaker replica of a painting on the same subject now in the Musée des Beaux-Arts of Strasbourg.

== See also ==
- List of works by El Greco

== Bibliography ==
- Wethey, Harold Edwin; El Greco y su Escuela (Volumen-II); Ediciones Guadarrama; Madrid-1967
- Scholz-Hänsel, Michael; El Greco; Taschen; Köln-2003; ISBN 978-3-8228-3173-1
