= Sinlessness of Mary =

Doctrine that Mary, the mother of Jesus, chose not to sin

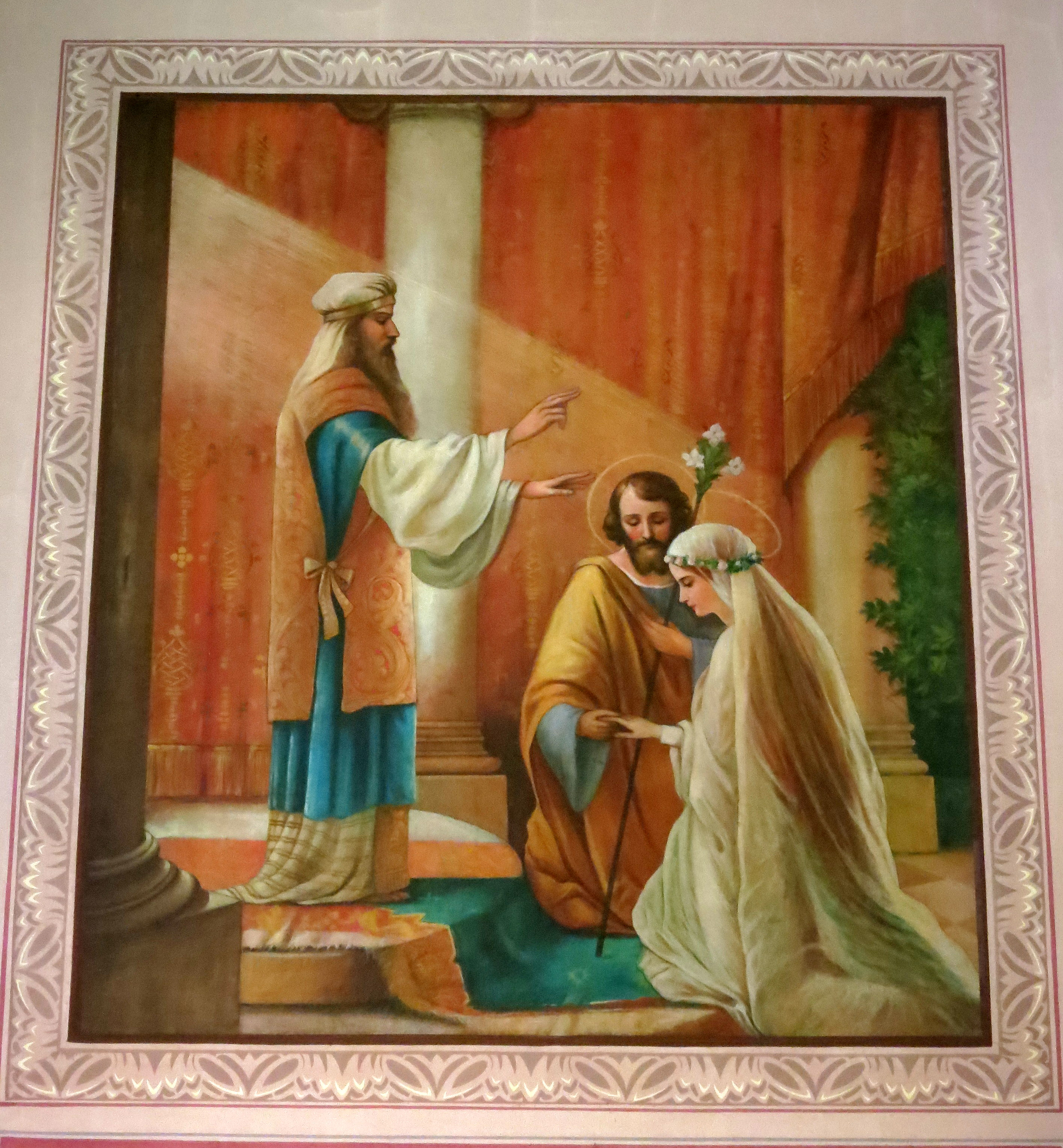
A fresco of The Marriage of the Virgin

The sinlessness of Mary refers to the doctrine in which Mary, Mother of God chose not to sin. It is upheld by the Catholic Church, Oriental Orthodox Churches, Eastern Orthodox Churches, as well as by high church Lutherans.

== Early Church ==
Justin Martyr, Irenaeus, and Cyril of Jerusalem developed the idea of Mary as the New Eve. So too, Ephrem the Syrian said she was as innocent as Eve before the Fall. Ambrose says she is incorrupt, a virgin immune through grace from every stain of sin. It was John Damascene's opinion that the supernatural influence of God at the generation of Mary was so comprehensive that it extended also to her parents. He says of them that, during the generation, they were filled and purified by the Holy Spirit, and freed from sexual concupiscence. Consequently, according to Damascene, even the human element of her origin, the material of which she was formed, was pure and holy. This opinion of an immaculate active generation and the sanctity of the "conceptio carnis" was taken up by some Western authors. Many Greek and Byzantine Fathers asserted that Mary remained without sin throughout her entire life.

By the 4th century the sinlessness of Mary was a common belief. Augustine in the 5th century upheld that Mary had no personal sin, but Augustine did not clearly affirm that she was free from original sin. Ambrose also held similar views as Augustine concerning the sinlessness of Mary.

Protestant apologist, James White has argued that many Greek Fathers denied the sinlessness of Mary, this includes John Chrysostom, Origen, Basil, and Cyril of Alexandria. J.N.D. Kelly also argued that Tertullian and Hilary of Poitiers believed that Mary had imperfections.

=== Origen of Alexandria ===
In Origen's Homilies on Luke xvii.6 he states:

Thereupon Simeon says, "a sword will pierce your very soul" (Lk 2.35). Which sword is this that pierced not only others' hearts, but even Mary's? Scripture clearly records that, at the time of the Passion, all the apostles were scandalized. The Lord himself said, "This night you will all be scandalized" (Mk 14.27). Thus, they were all so scandalized that Peter too, the leader of the apostles, denied him three times. Why do we think that the mother of the Lord was immune from scandal when the apostles were scandalized? If she did not suffer scandal at the Lord's Passion, then Jesus did not die for her sins. But, if "all have sinned and lack God's glory, but are justified by his grace and redeemed" (Rom 3.23) then Mary too was scandalized at that time."

== Christian denominations teaching the sinlessness of Mary ==
=== Eastern Orthodoxy ===
The Eastern Orthodox Churches teach that while Mary "inherited the same fallen nature, prone to sin" as with other humans, "she did not consent to sin through her free will." Due to being conceived in ancestral sin, Mary still needed "to be delivered by our Savior, her Son" according to Eastern Orthodox teaching. Mary is also, according to the Eastern Orthodox teaching, Aeiparthenos, which means "ever-virgin".

=== Oriental Orthodoxy ===
There is no official doctrine in the Pan-Oriental Orthodox Church regarding the Immaculate Conception. However, the Ethiopian Orthodox Church and Eritrean Orthodox Church believe that Mary did not contract ancestral sin at her conception. For Ethiopians, this is attested by the Council of Scholar and approved by the Holy Synod and can be found in the Synodal publication “THE ETHIOPIAN ORTHODOX TEWAHEDO CHURCH: FAITH, ORDER OF WORSHIP AND ECUMENICAL RELATIONS” published in 1996 on page 51.

=== Lutheranism ===
Martin Luther taught the lifelong sinlessness of Mary, a doctrine inherited by certain adherents of the high church Lutheran tradition. The Smalcald Articles, a Lutheran confession of faith, declare "that the Son became man in this manner: he was conceived by the Holy Spirit, without the cooperation of man, and was born of the pure, holy, and ever-virgin Mary." The theologian Kristofer Carlson, in explicating the Book of Concord, writes that "When Lutherans confess Mary as pure & holy, it is a reference to the chastity and sinlessness of Mary." Certain Lutheran denominations, such as the Wisconsin Evangelical Lutheran Synod, however, assert that "Jesus Christ, came to save people from their sins, including Mary."

== Comparison with Catholic doctrine ==
The Catholic Church teaches the Marian dogma of the Immaculate Conception, that Mary was conceived without original sin.

Outside of dogma, there is a common belief that Mary was also sinless personally. Pope Pius XII's 1943 encyclical Mystici corporis Christi from holds that Mary, was "free from all sin, original or personal".

Kenneth Baker writes that:

Two special factors rendered Mary impeccable or unable to sin. The first was her constant awareness of God, living always in His presence, and the second was her reception of special and extraordinary graces. These special graces made it possible for Mary to maintain a perfect harmony in her mind, will and emotions and to recognize always what was the right thing to do and then to do it.

The Catechism of the Catholic Church teaches that by the grace of God "Mary remained free of every personal sin her whole life long."
