= Commentary on the Magnificat =

Commentary on the Magnificat is a book written in 1521 by the Protestant Reformer Martin Luther. The book is considered an example of his theology of the Cross.

Pope John Paul II among others has quoted Luther's Magnificat during the audience on March 21, 2001.

== Original German text ==
- WA 7:314-364
