= Virgin Mary (El Greco, Strasbourg) =

Painting by El Greco

- Mater Dolorosa
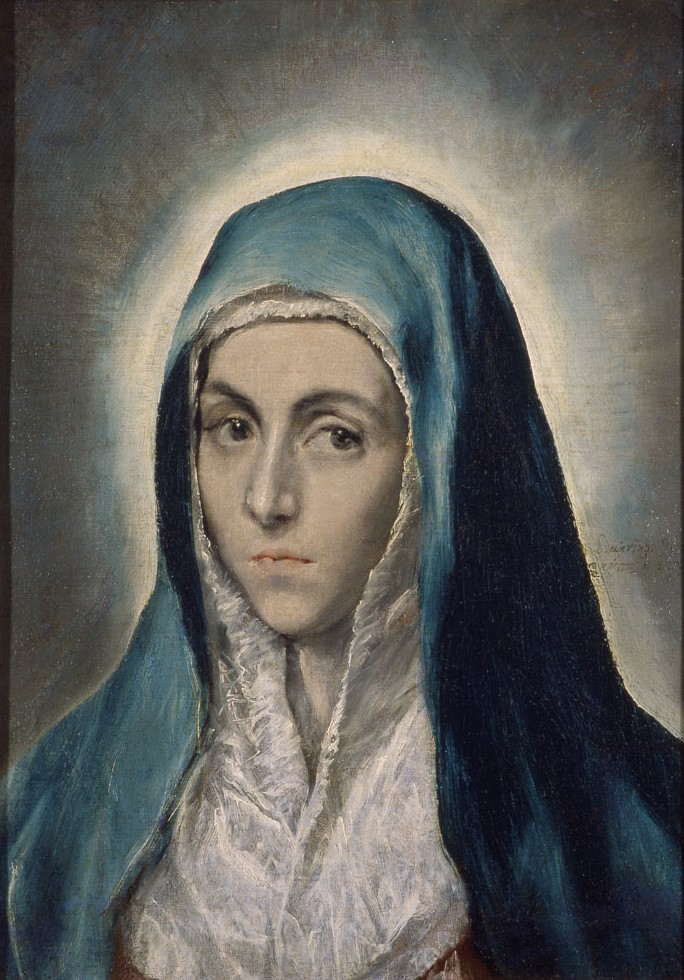
- Artist: El Greco
- Year: between 1594 and 1604
- Medium: oil painting on canvas
- Movement: Mannerism; Spanish Renaissance
- Subject: Mary, mother of Jesus
- Dimensions: 53 cm × 37 cm (21 in × 15 in)
- Location: Musée des Beaux-Arts, Strasbourg
- Accession: 1892

The Virgin Mary, also known as Mater Dolorosa, although this title is now considered misleading, is a late 1590s or early 1600s painting by the Greek born, Spanish Mannerist painter Doménikos Theotokópoulos (El Greco). It is on display in the Musée des Beaux-Arts of Strasbourg, France. Its inventory number is 276. A similar looking canvas in the Museo del Prado is considered a weaker replica.

The Strasbourg painting was presented to the museum in 1892 by John Charles Robinson, who had strong commercial ties to its director, Wilhelm von Bode. [The accession date was given as 1893 in previous publications.]

Mary is depicted with the face of an adolescent girl. The portrait painting type corresponds to a variation of the Byzantine Theotokos, with which Doménikos Theotokópoulos was naturally familiar.

== See also ==
- List of works by El Greco
