= Ecumenical meetings and documents on Mary =

Ecumenical meetings and documents on Mary, involving ecumenical commissions and working groups, have reviewed the status of Mariology in the Eastern Orthodox, Protestantism (Lutheran and Anglican), and Roman Catholic churches.

== Ecumenical meetings with Eastern Orthodoxy ==
=== Marian views ===
The Roman Catholic and Eastern Orthodox churches believe in Mary having a continuing role within the church and in the life of all Christians. The focus is upon Mary as a living person – that is, currently, in heaven – who can hear prayers uttered on Earth and intercede in the heavenly realms to her Son, Jesus, on behalf of humanity.

=== Ecumenical dialogue ===
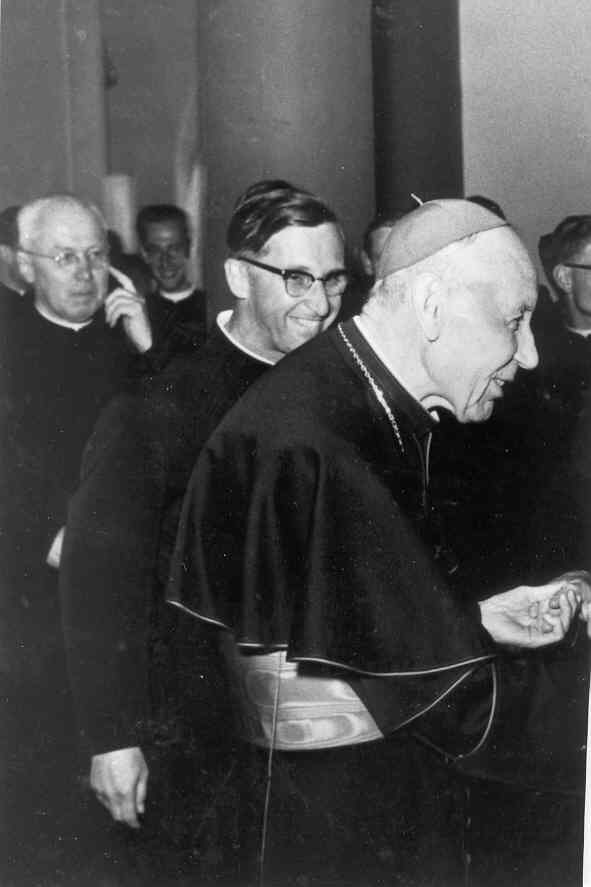
Cardinal Augustin Bea, credited with ecumenical breakthroughs during the Second Vatican Council, was the first president of the Secretariat for Promoting Christian Unity, which in 1960, invited the first ecumenical dialogues with the Catholic Church.

Mariology is not at the centre of Catholic–Orthodox ecumenical discussions. Catholics and Orthodox, while very close to one another in the faith, have difficulties in understanding each other culturally and mentally. In the East, there is a highly developed culture, but one with neither the Western separation between Church and State nor the modern Enlightenment in its background, and one perhaps marked most of all by the persecution of Christians under Communism.

Positive results dialogues have been reciprocal visits and regular correspondence between the Pope and the Patriarchs, frequent contacts at the local church level and – importantly for the strongly monastic Oriental churches – at the level of the monasteries. Several meetings between Popes and Patriarchs took place since the Vatican Council. In their Common Declaration of Pope John Paul II and the Ecumenical Patriarch His Holiness Bartholomew I (July 1, 2004), they agree that in the search for full communion, it would have been unrealistic not to expect obstacles of various kinds. They identify doctrine, but mainly the conditioning by a troubled history. New problems emerged from the radical changes in the East. The dialogue was made more and not less difficult after the fall of communism. The Joint International Commission for Theological Dialogue between the Catholic Church and all the Orthodox churches produced three between 1980 and 1990, which show a deep community in the understanding of faith, church and sacraments. Mariology and Marian issues were not even addressed in any of the joint documents, because mariological differences are seen as minor. The only seriously debated theological issue, besides the "Filioque"-clause in the Creed, which is still a motive of separation for most Orthodox, is the question of Roman primacy, the role of the pontiff.

As far as relations between the Church of Rome and the Church of Constantinople are concerned, Pope Benedict XVI and Patriarch Bartholomew agreed in 2007, that the memory of the ancient anathemas for centuries had a negative effect on relations between the churches, So far, no mariological commissions have been formed, according to one Orthodox specialist, because there are really no major differences in mariology itself. The last two dogmas are rejected because they were issues "by the Western Patriarch" but not because of content.

== Protestantism ==
=== Lutheranism ===
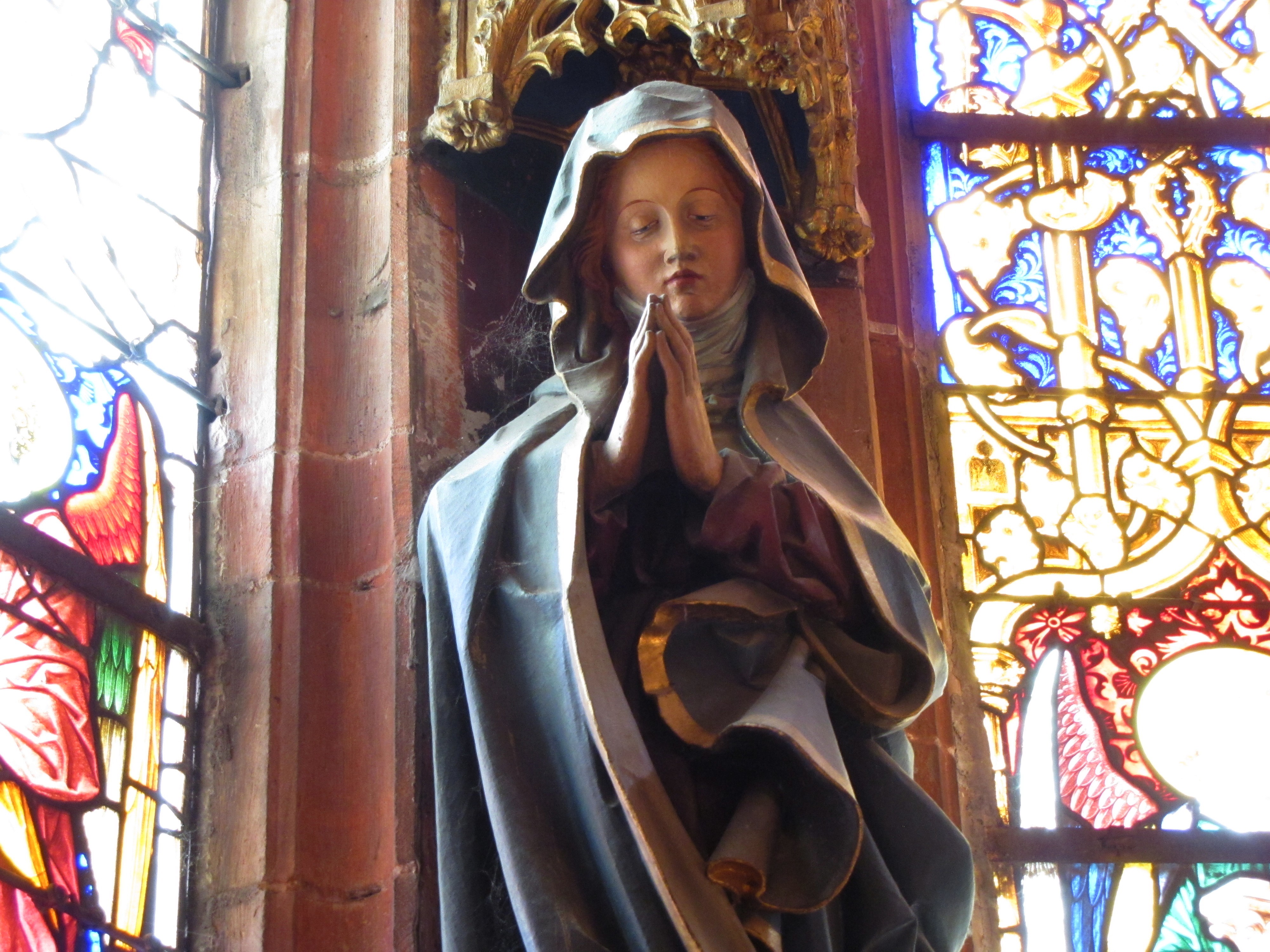
A statue of Mary in the Lutheran church of Saint-Pierre-le-Jeune, Strasbourg

==== Lutheran Mariology ====
The Lutheran churches, with respect to Lutheran Mariology, teach the doctrines of the Theotokos and the virgin birth, as summarized in the Formula of Concord in the Solid Declaration, Article VIII.24:

On account of this person union and communion of the natures, Mary, the most blessed virgin, did not conceive a mere, ordinary human being, but a human being who is truly the Son of the most high God, as the angel testifies. He demonstrated his divine majesty even in his mother's womb in that he was born of a virgin without violating her virginity. Therefore she is truly the mother of God and yet remained a virgin.

The Smalcald Articles, a confession of faith of the Lutheran churches, affirm the doctrine of the perpetual virginity of Mary.

Martin Luther, the founder of the Lutheran theological tradition, honoured Mary as "the most blessed Mother of God, the most blessed Virgin Mary, the Mother of Christ," and "the Queen of Heaven."

=== Ecumenical dialogue ===
==== Catholic–Lutheran dialogue ====
The Lutheran – Roman Catholic dialogue began in the 1960s and resulted in a number of covergering reports before the group discussed mariology. The first dialogues between the Lutheran and Catholic churches dealt with The Status of the Nicene Creed as Dogma of the Church; One Baptism for the Remission of Sins; and, The Eucharist as Sacrifice).

* Church as Koinonia: Its Structures and Ministries is the final report of the Tenth Round of the Lutheran-Roman Catholic Dialogue.

- Justification by Faith through Grace was prepared by the Evangelical Lutheran Church in Canada and the Canadian Conference of Catholic Bishops
- Joint Declaration on the Doctrine of Justification (JDDJ) - This official common statement by the Lutheran World Federation and the Catholic Church is the result of decades of dialogue on a key Lutheran view.
- Condemnations of the 16th Century on Justification: Do They Still Apply Today?
- Justification by Faith: Do the 16th Century Condemnations Still Apply? (Edited by Karl Lehmann, Michael Root, and William G. Rusch) - This text discusses the proposal between the Lutheran and Roman Catholic churches that the mutual condemnations made in the 16th century no longer apply today.
- Unity of the Churches: An Actual Possibility - Eight theses exploring the achievements of ecumenical dialogues, particularly those between Lutherans and Catholics. Of particular interest: text deals with mutual recognition of the ordained ministry and the problem of teaching authority manifested in the "infallibility" of the papacy.
- Lutheran-Catholic Quest for Visible Unity: A paper prepared by the Lutheran-Roman Catholic Coordinating Committee outlining hopes for full reconciliation. A summation of theological discussions and conclusions brought out by the dialogue.
- The Common Statement on Justification by Faith: The common statement resulting from the US Lutheran-Roman Catholic dialogue VII; a fundamental consensus on the Gospel. Includes the history of the issue, reflection and interpretation, and perspectives for reconstruction.
- Papal Primacy and the Universal Church: Lutherans and Catholics in Dialogue V - This dialogue centered on the major theological issue of the primacy of the pope. Presents background, meaning and future implications of the Common Statement on papal primacy as developed by the Lutheran-Catholic dialogue panel.
- Teaching Authority and Infallibility in the Church: Lutherans and Catholics in Dialogue VI - Essays building on the foundations laid by dialogue V explore the biblical, historical, and theological background surrounding traditional assumptions and theological interpretations regarding papal infallibility and the teaching authority of the church.
- Scripture and Tradition: Lutherans and Catholics in Dialogue IX: Details the dialogue's journey through the issue of the authority and use of scripture and tradition through discussion of the major theological and historical differences between the two bodies.

=== Mariological dialogue ===
The One Mediator, the Saints, and Mary: Lutherans and Catholics in Dialogue VIII is the result of a 7-year dialogue surrounding the issues of Christ as the one mediator, the Saints, and Mary. The Common statement on Mary has an "Introduction" and two major sections: "Part One: Issues and Perspectives" and "Part Two: Biblical and Historical Foundations."

==== Mediatrix ====
The key issue for the Lutheran participant was the role of Mary as Mediatrix in the Catholic Church. Regarding the Marian dogmas of the Immaculate Conception and the Assumption, the Lutheran participants thought that these need not divide the two churches as long as the sole mediatorship of Christ is safeguarded and in a case of more unity, Lutherans would not be asked to accept these two dogmas. There was an impression that the Mariology of Vatican Two included a strong description of Mary's mediator role. Lumen gentium was quoted: "in a wholly singular way [Mary] cooperated by her obedience, faith, hope and burning charity in the work of the Savior in restoring supernatural life to souls." "Taken up to heaven she did not lay aside this saving office but by her manifold intercession continues to bring us the gifts of eternal salvation." While Lumen gentium also stated that "is so understood that it neither takes away anything from nor adds anything to the dignity and efficacy of Christ the one Mediator." some Lutheran participants questioned whether these quote reduce the sole role of Jesus Christ as saviour.

=== Anglicanism ===
==== Anglican mariology ====
Anglican Mariology has a long tradition and rich history. Anglican Marian piety is close to Roman Catholic devotion: Never think about Mary, without thinking about God, and never think about God without thinking about Mary. From a Roman Catholic perspective, the closeness of the Anglican and Roman Catholic mariologies is overshadowed by the fact that Marian teachings have no binding doctrinal implications on churches in the Anglican Communion.

==== Ecumenical dialogue on Mariology ====
The Anglican-Roman Catholic International Commission (ARCIC) claims to have illuminated in a new way the place of Mary. The joint study led to the conclusion that it is impossible to be faithful to Scripture without giving due attention to the person of Mary.

==== Mariological consensus ====
Developments in the Anglican and Catholic communities opened the way for a new re-reception of the place of Mary in the faith and life of the Church. Consensus was reached regarding the role of Mary:

- The teaching that God has taken the Blessed Virgin Mary in the fullness of her person into his glory as consonant with Scripture, and only to be understood in the light of Scripture
- That in view of her vocation to be the mother of the Holy One, Christ's redeeming work reached 'back' in Mary to the depths of her being and to her earliest beginnings
- That the teaching about Mary in the two definitions of the Assumption and the Immaculate Conception, understood within the biblical pattern of the economy of hope and grace, can be said to be consonant with the teaching of the Scriptures and the ancient common traditions
- That this agreement, when accepted by our two Communions, would place the questions about authority which arise from the two definitions of 1854 and 1950 in a new ecumenical context
- That Mary has a continuing ministry which serves the ministry of Christ, our unique mediator, that Mary and the saints pray for the whole Church and that the practice of asking Mary and the saints to pray for us is not communion-dividing

==== Marian devotions ====
The growth of devotion to Mary in the medieval centuries, and the theological controversies associated with them included some excesses in late medieval devotion, and reactions against them by the Reformers, contributed to the breach of communion between us, following which attitudes toward Mary took divergent paths. The commission agreed, that doctrines and devotions which are contrary to Scripture cannot be said to be revealed by God nor to be the teaching of the Church. We agree that doctrine and devotion which focuses on Mary, including claims to ‘private revelations’, must be moderated by carefully expressed norms which ensure the unique and central place of Jesus Christ in the life of the Church, and that Christ alone, together with the Father and the Holy Spirit, is to be worshipped in the Church. The Commission did not to clear away all possible problems, but deepened a common understanding to the point where remaining diversities of devotional practice may be received as the varied work of the Spirit amongst all the people of God. Issues concerning doctrine and devotion to Mary need no longer be seen as communion-dividing, or an obstacle in a new stage of growing together. The Commission hopes that, “in the one Spirit by which Mary was prepared and sanctified for her unique vocation, we may together participate with her and all the saints in the unending praise of God.

==== Joint Anglican–Roman Catholic document ====
On May 16, 2005, the Roman Catholic and Anglican churches issued a joint 43-page statement, "Mary: Grace and Hope in Christ" (also known as the Seattle Statement) on the role of the Virgin Mary in Christianity as a way to uphold ecumenical cooperation despite differences over other matters. The document was released in Seattle, Washington, by Alexander Brunett, the local Catholic Archbishop, and Peter Carnley, Anglican Archbishop of Perth, Western Australia, co-chairmen of the Anglican—Roman Catholic International Commission (ARCIC).

The joint document is said to seek a common understanding to help both churches agree on the theological reasoning behind the Catholic dogmas, despite Anglicans not accepting the papal authority that underpins them. Carnley has reportedly said that Anglican concerns that dogmas about Mary are not provable by scripture would "disappear", with the document discussing that Anglicans would stop opposition to Roman Catholic teachings of the Immaculate Conception (defined in 1854) and the Assumption of Mary (defined in 1950) as being "consonant" with the biblical teachings.

== See also ==
- Common Christological Declaration Between the Catholic Church and the Assyrian Church of the East
