= Abish (Book of Mormon) =

Figure who revives the Lamanite queen

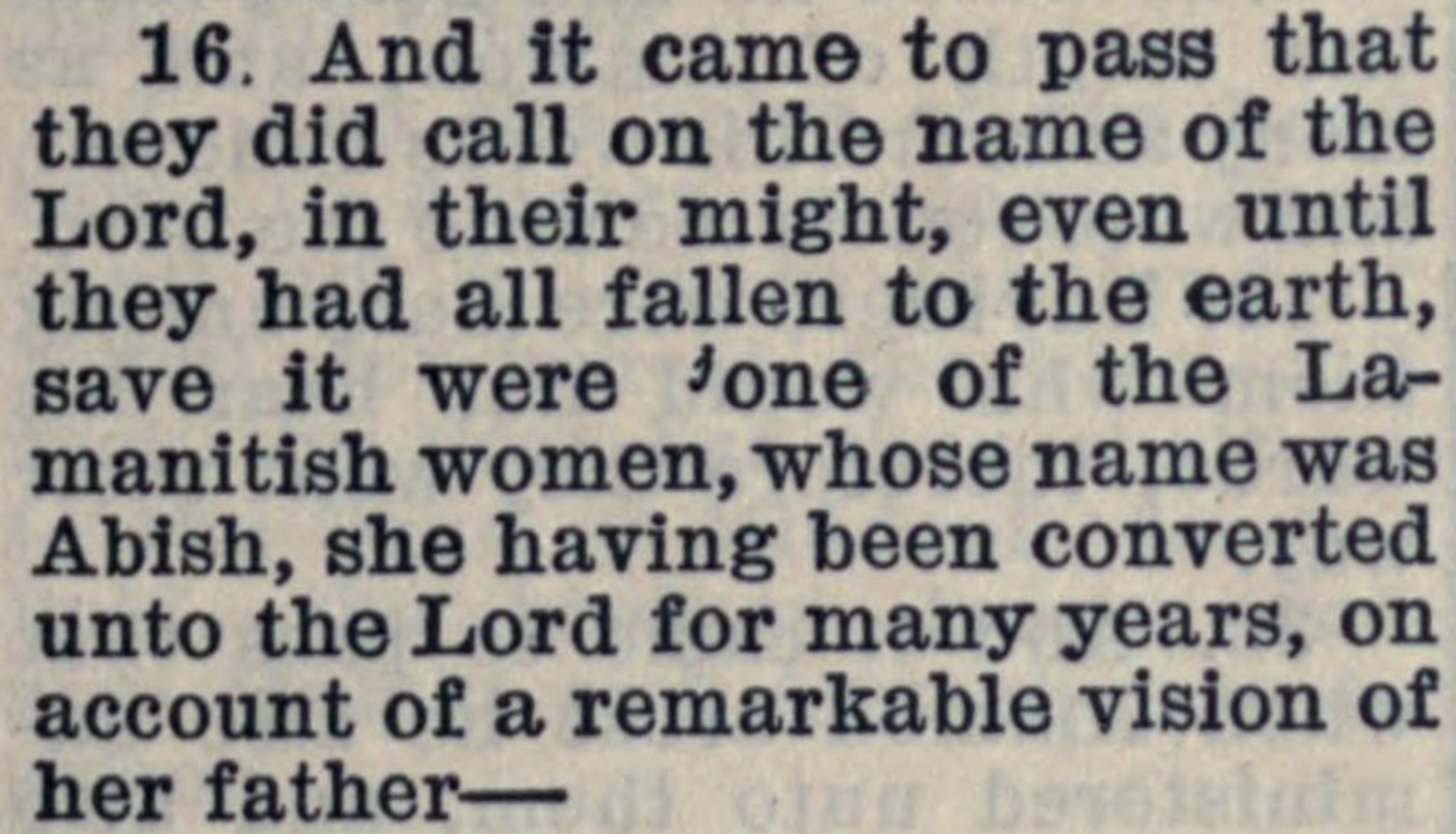
- Alma 19:16, the first and last mention of Abish in the Book of Mormon
- Occupation: Servant
- Era: Reign of the Judges (in the Book of Mormon)
- Known for: Reviving the Lamanite royalty

Abish (/ˈeɪbɪʃ/) is a figure in the Book of Mormon who plays a pivotal role in a missionary narrative. She is one of only three named women unique to the Book of Mormon along with Sariah and Isabel (the Biblical characters of Eve, Sarah, and Mary are also mentioned in the Book of Mormon but are not unique to it.)

Abish appears for the first and last time in the nineteenth chapter of the Book of Alma from the Book of Mormon. During the dramatic narrative of the conversion of King Lamoni and the teaching of the Nephite missionary Ammon, Abish plays a pivotal role in publicizing a miraculous spiritual outpouring and then performing another miracle by lifting the Lamanite queen from a death-like trance.

Literary and theological interpretations have read Abish and her narrative as a significant hinge point for the Book of Alma's broader plot, as an element of the book's self-reflexive critique of misogyny, as a divine subversion of human hierarchies, and as a messianic parallel to Jesus Christ's role in Christianity.

== Background ==
Abish appears in the nineteenth chapter of the Book of Alma, a part of the Book of Mormon.

=== Book of Mormon ===
Since its publication in 1830, the Book of Mormon has been the central religious text of the Latter Day Saint movement. Joseph Smith said he translated an ancient record by miraculous revelation from God to dictate the text of the book, which according to Smith, narrates the actual history of a family who left Jerusalem ahead of the Babylonian captivity and established a Christian society in the ancient Americas. (Note: Like Smith, most adherents of the Latter Day Saint movement believe—contrary to the findings of archaeology, history, and science—that the Book of Mormon is of ancient origin and describes actual historical people and events.) This society eventually splits along fraternal lines into two separate and warring peoples, called Nephites and Lamanites. The Lamanites reject Christianity, and they hate the Nephites, blaming them for deprivations they suffer as part of their people's founding myth. The Nephites in turn denigrate and racialize the Lamanites, indulging throughout the book in self-destructive ethnocentric pride. Although they temporarily find harmony following a post-resurrection visitation from Jesus Christ late in the book, they eventually divide again, and by the end of the book the Nephites are destroyed in the ensuing war.

The Book of Mormon is narrated by Nephite prophets internal to its narrative, principally Mormon, who in the course of their narration reflexively describe their creation of the text as a record of their people, the very record Smith claimed to translate. In the Book of Mormon story, Mormon is a historian living near the end of the chronological narrative, and from this temporal vantage point he retrospectively abridges, quotes from, and redacts years of Nephite history to create the text as the reader experiences it. This includes the portion of the book in which Abish appears.

=== Book of Alma ===
The Book of Mormon is divided into fifteen internal "books", reminiscent of books in the Bible, named after figures in the narrative. The ninth book in the Book of Mormon is the Book of Alma, which narrates thirty-nine years spanning the ministry of a prophet named Alma and, after his death, of his son Helaman during the "reign of the judges", an era of Nephite society in which monarchy has been replaced with a dynastic succession of semi-democratic hereditary judgeships. Structurally, the Book of Alma divides into four quarters with two parallel narratives: the first (Alma 1–16) and third quarters (Alma 30–44) compare divine–human relationships; the second (Alma 17–29) and fourth quarters (45–63) contrast Nephite–Lamanite interactions. Abish's narrative, contained in Alma 19, takes place in the second quarter of the Book of Alma.

=== Nephite Patriarchy ===
Women are rarely visible in the Book of Mormon, and the book frequently invokes masculine pronouns, as if implying a male audience. Throughout the entire narrative, Abish is one of only three women unique to the Book of Mormon to be directly named. (Note: There are a total of six named women in the Book of Mormon, but half are biblical figures—Eve, Sarah, Mary—leaving just three named Book of Mormon women, one of whom is Abish.) Because the Book of Mormon is mediated through narrators, biases of the text such as this become part of the book's overarching plot, attributes of "a narrative, authored in the first person" by fallible human narrators, Peter Coviello writes. The book's failure to individually identify women suggests that within the Book of Mormon's setting "the Nephites overlooked and disempowered women", Fatimah Salleh and Margaret Olsen Hemming explain. The book's overarching structure develops a plot in which the Nephites' patriarchal society is a significant factor in their ultimate downfall by the end of the narrative. By contrast, two Book of Mormon prophets (Jacob and Samuel) point out in prophetically charged sermons that in Lamanite society, men and women have healthy, loving relationships not characterized by the abuse that happens in Nephite society.

=== Lamanite Prophecies ===
Hostility between Nephites and Lamanites is part of much of the Book of Mormon narrative. Within that story there are also divine prophecies promising that the Lamanites' rejection of Christianity is temporary and foretelling their future embrace of the Christian message as inheritors to ancient promises. Earlier narratives in the Book of Mormon describe Nephites receiving prophetic knowledge that Lamanites are destined to fulfill the covenant between Lehi's family and God.

== Narrative ==
Prior to Abish's introduction, several Nephites are in the midst of a missionary outreach to the Lamanites, despite the risk to their safety amid the hostilities between their peoples, and despite discouragement from other Nephites who derisively suggest that going to war with the Lamanites would be more productive. One of these missionaries, Ammon, goes to the land of the Lamanite king Lamoni who, contrary to popular Nephite perception of Lamanites, does not harm Ammon and even invites Ammon to become part of his family by marrying his daughter (an offer that Ammon declines). Instead, Ammon becomes a servant to Lamoni. Ammon's compassionate service earns Lamoni's trust, and the king becomes receptive to Ammon. In this process, the king experiences a conversion to Christ and faints from joy as does his wife, the queen, their servants who are present, and Ammon himself, leaving all "as though they were dead" while overcome with the spirit.

Abish raising the queen

"And thus the contention began to be exceedingly sharp among them. And while they were thus contending, the woman servant [Abish] who had caused the multitude to be gathered together came, and when she saw the contention which was among the multitude she was exceedingly sorrowful, even unto tears.

"And it came to pass that she went and took the queen by the hand, that perhaps she might raise her from the ground; and as soon as she touched her hand she arose and stood upon her feet, and cried with a loud voice, saying: O blessed Jesus, who has saved me from an awful hell! O blessed God, have mercy on this people!"

"And when she had said this, she clasped her hands, being filled with joy, speaking many words which were not understood; and when she had done this, she took the king, Lamoni, by the hand, and behold he arose and stood upon his feet.

— Book of Mormon, Alma 19:28–30

Abish is introduced at this point. Described as a "Lamanitish" (Note: Literary scholar Kylie Turley writes that the meaning of "Lamanitish" is not precisely explained in the text, but the "story hints that this is not an enviable position", and "it seems probable Abish is not a Lamanite or a Nephite", giving her a liminal, uncategorized status in "a book that categorizes nearly everyone".) servant of Lamoni, Abish is one of the few people in Lamanite society who believes in Jesus Christ before Ammon's arrival, "having been converted unto the Lord for many years, on account of a remarkable vision of her father". (Note: Quotation is Alma 19:16. Scholars debate the appropriate interpretation of the passage. As literary scholar Kylie Turley summarizes, "Did Abish see a remarkable vision of her father, which converted her to the Lord? Or did her father see a remarkable vision, which converted her to the Lord?" This could be read as describing a theophany in which Abish saw her "heavenly" father, i.e. God.) Of all who are present in Lamoni's household, only Abish does not faint and enter a death-like trance.

When Abish sees that everyone has fainted she knows it is the result of the power of the Lord. Upon recognizing this, she hopes that the experience will help others also be converted to following God, and so she begins to run from house to house calling neighboring Lamanites to come and see. However, Abish is heartbroken when many of the people who gather begin arguing about what has happened. Some people think the royal household's condition signifies that "a great evil that had come upon them" as divine punishment upon Lamoni for allowing a Nephite to dwell in their territory. One person present even attempts to kill Ammon while he is unconscious, and others suggest that Ammon is not a human Nephite, but instead somehow a kind of monster. Realizing that the people are angry at the sight of the scene, rather than finding joy in the miracle as she had, Abish despairs and becomes "exceedingly sorrowful, even unto tears".

Amid the people's argument about the condition of the king, queen, and their household, Abish goes to the queen and tries to lift her from the ground. As soon as Abish touches her, the queen wakes, joyfully proclaims her conversion to Christ, and speaks in tongues. The queen then takes Lamoni's hand, waking him in a similar manner, and he calms the crowd, tells them what he has experienced, and begins to teach them about God. As a result, many more people are converted, and this begins a chain of conversions among the Lamanites. Abish's and the Lamanite queen's actions thereby become fundamental to the fulfillment of the Book of Mormon story's earlier promise that Lamanites would adopt Christianity and fulfill God's covenant with Lehi.

After raising the Lamanite queen, Abish vanishes from the narrative, and she never reappears in the Book of Mormon.

== Textual history ==
In the officially-published Latter-day Saint edition of the Book of Mormon, when Abish raises the Lamanite queen from the ground, the queen is described as having "clasped her hands" after proclaiming her conversion. However, in the printer's manuscript of the Book of Mormon (a transcribed copy of the original transcription, used by the typesetter for the 1830 edition), the same passage states that the queen "clapped her hands". The textual variant was introduced with the 1830 edition. In the manuscript, Oliver Cowdery misspelled "clapped" as "claped", with a single p, and Royal Skousen hypothesizes the typesetter misread this as "clasped", leading to the variant.

The 1908 edition published by the Reorganized Church of Jesus Christ of Latter Day Saints (later renamed to Community of Christ) restored "clapped her hands" to the text.

== Interpretation ==
=== Women and gender ===
Nicholas Frederick and Joseph Spencer write that the narrative Abish appears in "arguably contain[s] the only strong female characters of any substance in the whole" Book of Mormon. Outside of biblical quotations, the affirmative singular woman only appears four times in the Book of Mormon, all within the interaction between Abish and the Lamanite queen; this highlights the importance of Abish's narrative in the book's overall depiction of gender relations. The success of Ammon's mission to the Lamanites hinges on Abish's presence and her preparation to be a missionary in his stead. Since her conversion relates in some way to her relationship to her father, Abish's story suggests Lamanite society's healthy gender relations in which men and women share domestic intimacy as parents, children, and spouses, contrasting with Nephite society's patriarchal organization. Furthermore, the overall story with Ammon, the Lamanite royalty, and Abish parallels John 11, in which Jesus revives Lazarus of Bethany from death, but Abish and the queen fill the role of Jesus. While the women in John 11 (Martha and Mary of Bethany) are corrected for their initial shortcomings in faith, Abish's story instead positions women as agents for their own and others' benefit, capable of fulfilling a salvific purpose.

Some scholarship reads the Abish story less optimistically. Carol Lynn Pearson describes Abish's visionary conversion as her having "converted to the Lord because of a remarkable vision her father had had years before, not a vision of her own", rendering Abish a "spiritually dependent woman". Dale Luffman, an emeritus Community of Christ apostle, criticizes the lack of direct dialogue for Abish, writing that she "is not given 'voice,' only touch".

=== Subverting hierarchy ===
The narrative of Abish promotes a message in which God empowers the disenfranchised and subverts hierarchies. As the story leads up to Abish's appearance, "the focal point... shifts deliberately", Salleh and Olsen Hemming explain: the narrative first follows Ammon, a royal Nephite man; next Lamoni is at the center of the story, and he is not Nephite, but he is royal and male; after Lamoni faints, the story focuses on the queen, who lacks male privilege and Nephite privilege but retains class privilege as a monarch. When the whole royal household is unconscious, Abish becomes the effective protagonist despite lacking any form of privilege within the social stratifications in the Book of Mormon's narrative. Word choice unique in the Book of Mormon to the sequence involving Abish implies that within the framing narrative she partly provides the narratorial voice, leaving her impression on the story. With no social capital, Abish instead relies on spiritual empowerment and insight to discern and act upon the power of God in her life and in others, and her actions are ultimately world-changing within the book's context.

=== Revelation ===
The Book of Mormon portrays a religious culture that seeks guidance from and closeness to God through both inherited scriptures and contemporary revelation. In the story of Ammon's mission to Lamoni's people, he first teaches Lamoni by referring to scripture. After Lamoni's household and Ammon fall into the trance, Abish introduces a revelatory experience to complement Ammon's earlier use of scripture, highlighting scripture and revelation as interdependent resources in the Book of Mormon's depiction of a life of faith. Abish's vision becomes the first in a series of visions that Lamanites experience which motivate their embrace of Christianity.

=== Messianic parallels ===
Abish's role in the narrative symbolically alludes to Jesus Christ. Abish's liminality as a "Lamanitish" woman suggests Christ's dual, category-defying nature as both god and man. When Abish lifts the queen from the floor and raises her from slumber, the narrative parallels John 11, casting Abish in the place of Jesus raising Lazarus of Bethany from the dead while the queen takes Lazarus's place. The Lamanite queen in turn raises Lamoni such that she alludes to both Lazarus and Jesus in John 11. And Turley notes how with no social privilege, Abish "descends below everyone else in this story" yet from there "lift[s] people up when they fall to earth", paralleling Jesus descending below all things in order to lift humanity as part of the Christian atonement.

=== Other metaphors ===
The Encyclopedia of Mormonism suggests reading Abish as an archetypal "godly servant".

Camille S. Williams reads Ammon as a metaphor for the Book of Mormon with the Lamanite queen and Abish symbolizing responsive readers. In this analogy, some critical reactions to the Book of Mormon reject it as if it is a "monster" that needs to be "slain" in a manner that resembles the hostile Lamanite response to seeing Ammon and the royal household in a trance. According to Williams, a perceptive reader behaves like Abish or the queen, willing to receive the Book of Mormon in the way Abish and the queen receive Ammon.

== Cultural reception ==
Although Abish is directly named only once in the Book of Mormon and only appears in a handful of verses, literary scholar Kylie Nielson Turley argues Abish nevertheless leaves a strong impression on readers because her response to the situation she finds herself in is so active, because she is a woman (in a book where women appear infrequently), and because the Book of Mormon narrative takes place, if only for a few verses, effectively from her perspective, inviting empathy from the book's audience. Howard W. Hunter, a president of the Church of Jesus Christ of Latter-day Saints (LDS Church; the largest denomination of the Latter Day Saint movement) described Abish in a speech as one who made meaningful contributions in the world: "Abish, servant to the Lamanite queen... made contributions unacknowledged by the eyes of man but not unseen by the eyes of God". (Note: Quotation is from Hunter, Howard W. (September 1991). "Out of Limelight". New Era, originally given as a speech at BYU on September 2, 1990 when Hunter was president of the Quorum of the Twelve Apostles.)

Excerpt from "Abish" (poem)

Oh see! Attend ye, one and all!
The queen rises!
She calls the king!
Ah blessed hour!
Ah blessed sunrise for my people!

— Mildred Hunt, Book of Mormon and Other Poems (1981) (Note: Quoted in Bone 2001, p. 16. Original publication is Hunt, Mildred (1981). Book of Mormon and Other Poems. Print King. p. 19.)

Novelist Mette Ivie Harrison's 2019 The Book of Abish uses the negative space in Abish's story as room to work in and a place to jump off from, and she crafts a 190-page narrative starring Abish as the youngest daughter of a large family that experiences reversals of fortune similar to Frances Hodgson Burnett's A Little Princess (1905). Harrison's Abish is a "woman of destiny", reviewer Luisa Perkins writes, and comparable to the biblical Queen Esther.

A thesis written in 2001 reports finding two poems written about Abish, by Donnell Hunter and Mildred Hunt respectively, as well as four paintings: Abish and the Queen by Sherrie H. Thomas; Women of Exceeding Faith: The Queen and Abish by Ann Croft; Lamoni's Queen by Blanche P. Wilson; and Because of Thy Exceeding Faith by Sherilynn Boyer Doty. The last of these portrays all four of the narrative's principal figures: Abish, Ammon, Lamoni, and the Lamanite queen. The Book of Mormon Art Catalog has catalogued several artworks depicting Abish.

Starting in 2019, the LDS Church released a series of video depictions of Book of Mormon narratives. Amber Weiss plays Abish, and Weiss describes Abish as being someone who teaches women that "we are powerful, and we have the ability to do big things".

== See also ==
- Anti-Nephi-Lehies
- Mormon feminism
- Mormonism and women
- Outline of the Book of Mormon

== Sources ==
- Berkey, Kimberly M.; Spencer, Joseph M. (2019). "'Great Cause to Mourn': The Complexity of the Book of Mormon's Presentation of Gender and Race". In Fenton, Elizabeth; Hickman, Jared (eds.). Americanist Approaches to the Book of Mormon. Oxford University Press. pp. 298–320. doi:10.1093/oso/9780190221928.003.0013. ISBN 9780190221928.
- Bone, Wendy L. (August 2001). Because of Thy Exceeding Faith: A Choreographic Portrayal of Women in the Book of Mormon (MA thesis). Brigham Young University.
- Bowen, Donna Lee; Williams, Camille S. (1992). "Women in the Book of Mormon". In Ludlow, Daniel H. (ed.). Encyclopedia of Mormonism. Macmillan Publishing Company. pp. 1577–1580.
- Bowen, Matthew L. (2018). "Abish, Theophanies, and the First Lamanite Restoration". Religious Educator. 19 (1): 59–81.
- Bushman, Richard Lyman (2004). "The Book of Mormon and the American Revolution". In Neilson, Reid L.; Woodworth, Jed (eds.). Believing History: Latter-day Saint Essays. Columbia University Press. pp. 47–59. ISBN 0-231-13006-6.
- Bushman, Richard Lyman (2004a). "The Lamanite View of Book of Mormon History". In Neilson, Reid L.; Woodworth, Jed (eds.). Believing History: Latter-day Saint Essays. Columbia University Press. pp. 79–92. ISBN 0-231-13006-6.
- Bushman, Richard Lyman (2008). Mormonism: A Very Short Introduction. Very Short Introductions. Vol. 183. Oxford University Press. ISBN 978-0-19-531030-6.
- Coe, Michael (January 1973). "Mormons and Archaeology: An Outside View". Dialogue: A Journal of Mormon Thought. 8 (2): 40–48. doi:10.2307/45224400. JSTOR 45224400.
- Coviello, Peter (2019). Make Yourselves Gods: Mormons and the Unfinished Business of American Secularism. Class 200. University of Chicago Press. ISBN 9780226474168.
- Davis, William L. (2020). Visions in a Seer Stone: Joseph Smith and the Making of the Book of Mormon. University of North Carolina Press. ISBN 9781469655673.
- Frederick, Nicholas J. (2017). "'The Intent for Which It Was Given': How the Book of Mormon Teaches the Value of Scripture and Revelation". Religious Educator. 18 (1): 63–79.
- Frederick, Nicholas J.; Spencer, Joseph M. (September 2018). "John 11 in the Book of Mormon". Journal of the Bible and Its Reception. 5 (1): 81–105. doi:10.1515/jbr-2016-0025. ISSN 2329-4434. S2CID 165737531.
- Hardy, Grant (2010). Understanding the Book of Mormon: A Reader's Guide. Oxford University Press. ISBN 9780199745449.
- Harris, Sharon J. (2020). Enos: A Brief Theological Introduction. Neal A. Maxwell Institute. ISBN 978-0-8425-0015-9.
- Luffman, Dale E. (2012). "Absence of Women's Voices: A Critique of the Book of Mormon Narrative". Restoration Studies: Theology and Culture in the Community of Christ and Latter Day Saint Movement. 13: 28–38.
- Maffly-Kipp, Laurie F. (2008). "Introduction". The Book of Mormon. Penguin Classics. Penguin Books. pp. vi–xxxii. ISBN 978-0-14-310553-4.
- Morrill, Susanna (2005). "Women and the Book of Mormon: The Creation and Negotiation of a Latter-day Saint Tradition". In Engler, Steven; Grieve, Gregory P. (eds.). Historicizing "Tradition" in the Study of Religion. Walter de Gruyter. pp. 127–144. ISBN 978-3-11-018875-2.
- Pearson, Carol Lynn (March 1996). "Could Feminism Have Saved the Nephites?" (PDF). Sunstone. pp. 32–40.
- Perkins, Luisa (Summer 2019). "The Maidservant's Witness". Dialogue: A Journal of Mormon Thought (review). 52 (2): 184–187. doi:10.5406/dialjmormthou.52.2.0184. S2CID 246628989.
- Rust, Richard Dilworth (1994). "Recurrence in Book of Mormon Narratives". Journal of Book of Mormon Studies. 3 (1): 39–52. ISSN 1065-9366. JSTOR 44758653.
- Salleh, Fatimah; Olsen Hemming, Margaret (2022). The Book of Mormon for the Least of These. Vol. 2, Mosiah–Alma. By Common Consent Press. ISBN 978-1-948218-58-0.
- Skousen, Royal, ed. (2009). The Book of Mormon: The Earliest Text. Yale University Press. ISBN 978-0-300-14218-1.
- Skousen, Royal (2014). Analysis of Textual Variants of the Book of Mormon. Part three, Mosiah 17–Alma 20. The Critical Text of the Book of Mormon. Vol. 4. FARMS. ISBN 978-0-934893-11-4.
- Spencer, Joseph M. (2017). "The Structure of the Book of Alma". Journal of Book of Mormon Studies. 26 (2017): 273–283. hdl:1877/6087. JSTOR 10.18809/jbms.2017.0116.
- Spencer, Joseph M. (2019). "Women and Nephite Men: Lessons from the Book of Alma". In Hull, Kerry; Frederick, Nicholas J.; Smith, Hank R. (eds.). Give Ear to My Words: Text and Context of Alma 36–42. Religious Studies Center. pp. 235–254. ISBN 978-1-9443-9484-4.
- Stathis, Stephen W. (Summer 1983). "A Survey of Current Literature". Dialogue: A Journal of Mormon Thought. 16 (2): 101–120. doi:10.2307/45228239. JSTOR 45228239.
- Thomas, John Christopher (2016). A Pentecostal Reads the Book of Mormon: A Literary and Theological Introduction. CPT Press. ISBN 9781935931553.
- Turley, Kylie Nielson (2020). Alma 1–29: A Brief Theological Introduction. The Book of Mormon: brief theological introductions. Neal A. Maxwell Institute for Religious Scholarship. ISBN 978-0-8425-0024-1.
- Vogel, Dan (1986). Indian Origins and the Book of Mormon. Signature Books.
- Williams, Camille S. (2002). "Women in the Book of Mormon: Inclusion, Exclusion, and Interpretation". Journal of Book of Mormon Studies. 11 (1): 66–79, 111–114. ISSN 1065-9366. JSTOR 10.5406/jbookmormstud.11.1.0066.
