= P128 =

P128 may refer to:

- Papyrus 128, a biblical manuscript
- TCG Büyükdere (P-128), a patrol boat of the Turkish Navy
- P128, a state regional road in Latvia
