= John 10 =

- ← chapter 9 chapter 11 →
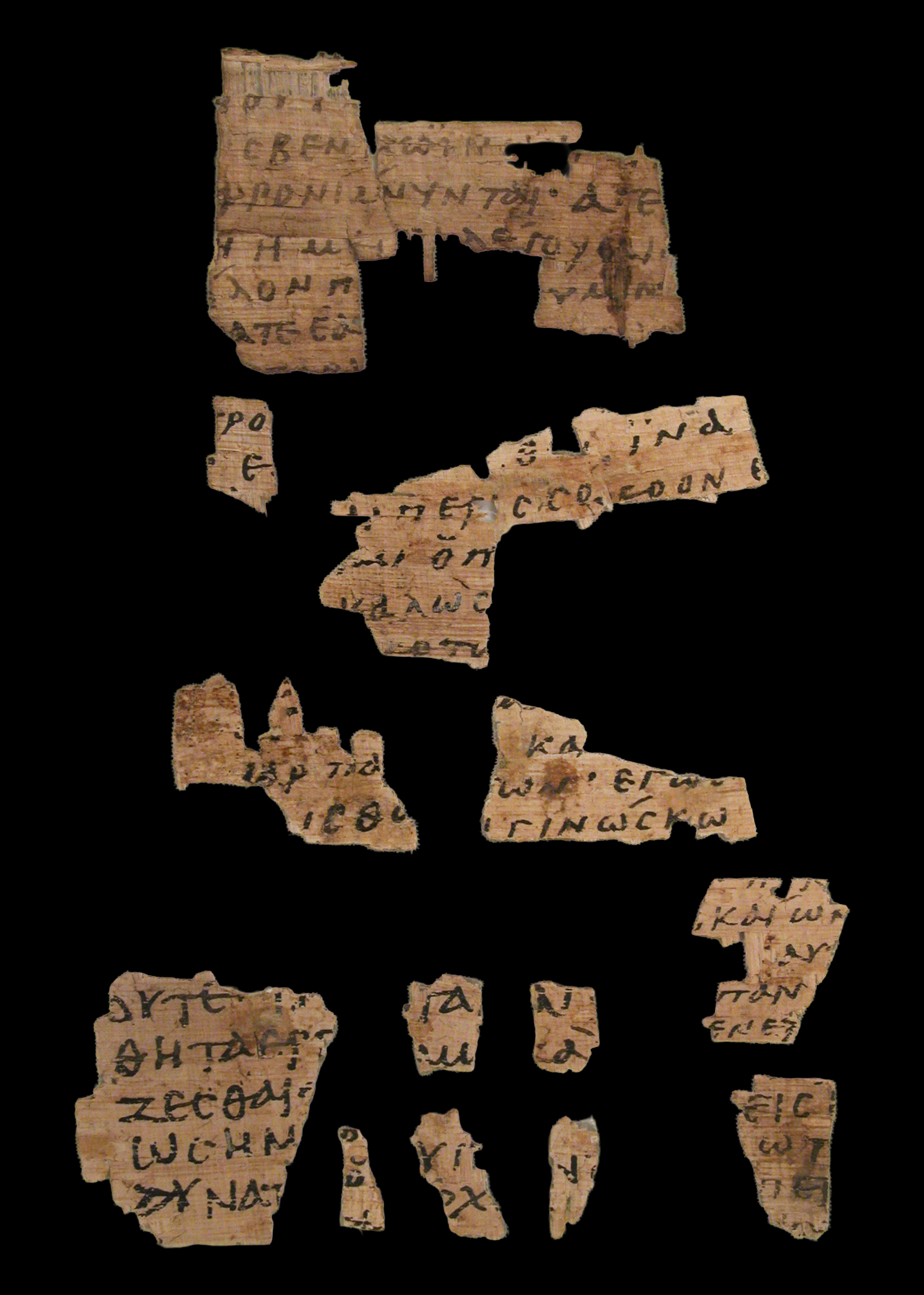
- Fragments of Papyrus 44 (6th/7th-century) containing Matthew 25:8-10; John 10:8-14. Metropolitan Museum of Art 14.1.527, New York City
- Book: Gospel of John
- Category: Gospel
- Christian Bible part: New Testament
- Order in the Christian part: 4

John 10 is the tenth chapter of the Gospel of John in the New Testament of the Christian Bible. The gospel identifies an unnamed "disciple whom Jesus loved" as its source and possible author. Early Christian tradition uniformly affirmed that John composed this Gospel. This chapter records Jesus' description of himself as the "door of the sheep" and the "Good Shepherd", and contains the only mention of Hanukkah, "the Feast of Dedication", in the New Testament.

== Text ==
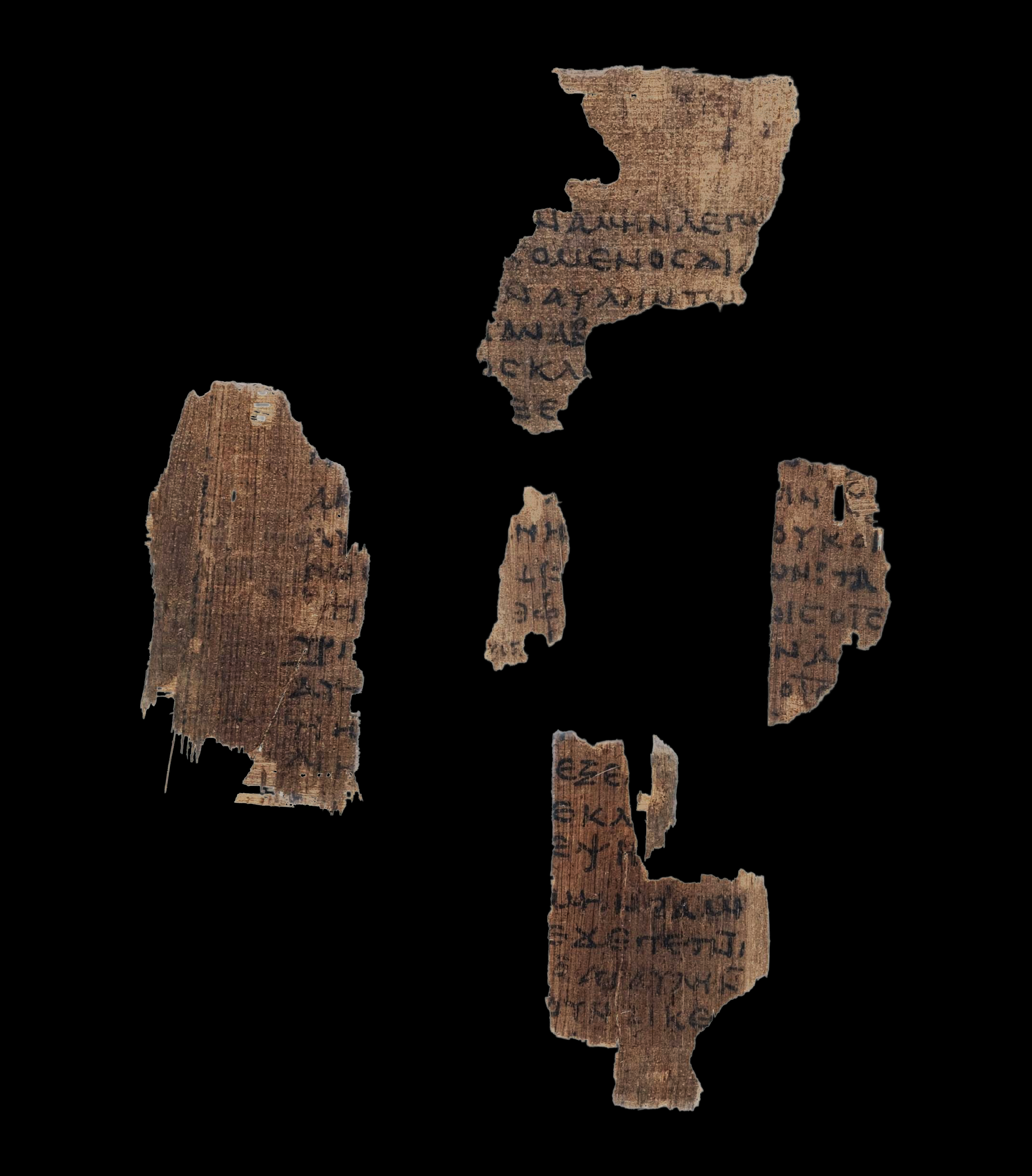
John 10:1-10 in Papyrus 6, written c. AD 350

The original text was written in Koine Greek. This chapter is divided into 42 verses. Some early manuscripts containing the text of this chapter are:

- Papyrus 75 (AD 175–225)
- Papyrus 66 (~200)
- Codex Vaticanus (325–350)
- Papyrus 6 (~350; extant: Greek verses 1–2, 4–7, 9–10; Coptic verses 1–12, 20)
- Codex Sinaiticus (330–360)
- Codex Bezae (~400)
- Codex Alexandrinus (400–440)

=== Old Testament references ===
- John 10:11: Isaiah 40:11, Ezekiel 34:23
- John 10:22: 1 Maccabees 4:59
- John 10:34: Psalm 82:6

== Places ==
Events recorded in this chapter refer to the following locations:

- Jerusalem (John 10:22–39)
- The east bank of Jordan River, the place where John the Baptist was baptizing at first. (John 10:40–42)

== The true shepherd illustration ==
In verses 1–5, Jesus uses a parable, illustration or "figure of speech" regarding the manner in which a true shepherd enters his sheepfold, through the door or the gate, unlike the manner of a thief or a stranger. H. W. Watkins notes that "the word rendered 'parable' (in verse 6) is the wider word (Greek: παροιμία, paroimia) which includes every kind of figurative and proverbial teaching, every kind of speech ... which departs from the usual course (Greek: οἶμος, oimos)". The word παραβολα (parabola) is not used in John's Gospel.

Jesus begins:

Very truly I tell you Pharisees, anyone who does not enter the sheep pen by the gate, but climbs in by some other way, is a thief and a robber.

The Pharisees are not mentioned in the Greek text (λεγω υμιν, legō humin, "I speak to you") but they are mentioned in the New International Version (NIV) in continuity with John 9:40, where "some Pharisees" had spoken with Jesus. The NIV and the Jerusalem Bible also confirm in verse 6 that the Pharisees are the group Jesus is addressing. German Protestant theologian Heinrich Meyer argues that these verses continue from chapter 9 "without the slightest indication of a change having taken place", and that ideally the chapter break would have been inserted at John 9:35. Henry Alford likewise connects this pericope with John 9:35-41.

In this illustration, the true shepherd "enters the sheepfold by the door" and "calls his own sheep by name and leads them out (Greek: ἐξάγει αὐτά)" (John 10:1,3). The alternative way in, taken by the thief or stranger, is to "climb up some other way", i.e. to climb over the wall of the sheepfold. The narrative is introduced "very truly" or "most assuredly". Jesus' audience ("they", verse 6) did not understand what he was saying, and did not understand that he was applying the reference to thieves and robbers (verse 1) to themselves.

In its reference to the shepherd leading the flock out of the sheepfold, verse 3 has the only occurrence in the New Testament of the word ἐξάγει (exagei). The Ethiopic version adds "and loves them" to verse 3.

== The door of the sheep and the good shepherd ==
In verse 7, Jesus "feels compelled" to start again (πάλιν, palin). He describes himself here and in verse 9 as "the door of the sheep", and in 10:11 and 10:14 as "the good shepherd". The word in Greek: θύρα is translated as "door" in the King James Version, the American Standard Version, and the Revised Standard Version, but as "gate" in the New Revised Standard Version, the New International Version, the Common English Bible, and other translations. In verse 7, the Textus Receptus adds that Jesus said to them (Greek: αὐτοῖς) but this addition is generally agreed to be "of doubtful authority".

== The hired hand ==
^{12} He who is a hired hand and not a shepherd, who does not own the sheep, sees the wolf coming and leaves the sheep and flees, and the wolf snatches them and scatters them. ^{13} He flees because he is a hired hand and cares nothing for the sheep.

These verses contain a new figure of speech which builds on the reference to a "stranger" in verse 5, here highlighting the unreliability of the hired hand ("hireling" KJV, RSV, NKJV) who runs away.

== Verse 21 ==
Others said, "These are not the words of one who has a demon. Can a demon open the eyes of the blind?"

This verse further reiterates the continuity between this chapter and the dialogue following the healing of the man born blind in John 9.

== The Feast of Dedication ==
Verse 22 refers to Hanukkah:

Now it was the Feast of Dedication in Jerusalem, and it was winter.

The feast (Greek: τὰ ἐγκαίνια, ta egkainia) recalls the Maccabean purification and re-dedication of the Temple, 1 Maccabees 4:36–51. The narrative moves forward from the Feast of Tabernacles, when the events and teaching from John 7:14 to 10:21 appear to take place. During the intervening two months, there is no account of whether Jesus remained in Jerusalem or not. In John 7:40 we read that Jesus "went away again beyond the Jordan". Meyer identifies a number of commentators who have suggested that there was an additional "journey to Galilee or Peraea" before the feast of dedication, although he himself considers that these suggestions are "dictated by harmonistic presuppositions and clumsy combinations, ... and not by the requirements of exegesis".

Jesus walked in the temple, in Solomon’s porch or colonnade, a gathering place used by the early church (see Acts 3:11 and 5:12) located on the eastern side of the temple.

== The believers beyond the Jordan ==
The chapter ends with Jesus evading Jewish attempts to stone him (John 10:31,39) and then leaving Jerusalem (John 10:40) and traveling "beyond the Jordan to the place where John was baptizing at first" (Perea). Matthew 19:1 and Mark 10:1 similarly record that Jesus traveled "to the region of Judea by the other side of the Jordan", but in the synoptic tradition He had previously been in Capernaum rather than Jerusalem. Perea was a region where many people "came to the decision that He was the Messiah" (John 10:42 in the Living Bible translation).

== See also ==
- Hanukkah
- Jerusalem
- Jesus Christ
- John the Baptist
- Jordan River
- Solomon's Porch
- Trinitarian indwelling (related to John 10:38)
- Related Bible parts: Psalm 23, Psalm 82, Ezekiel 34

Preceded by John 9	Chapters of the Bible; Gospel of John	Succeeded by John 11
