= The Blind Man at the Pool of Siloam =

Painting by Edmund Blair Leighton

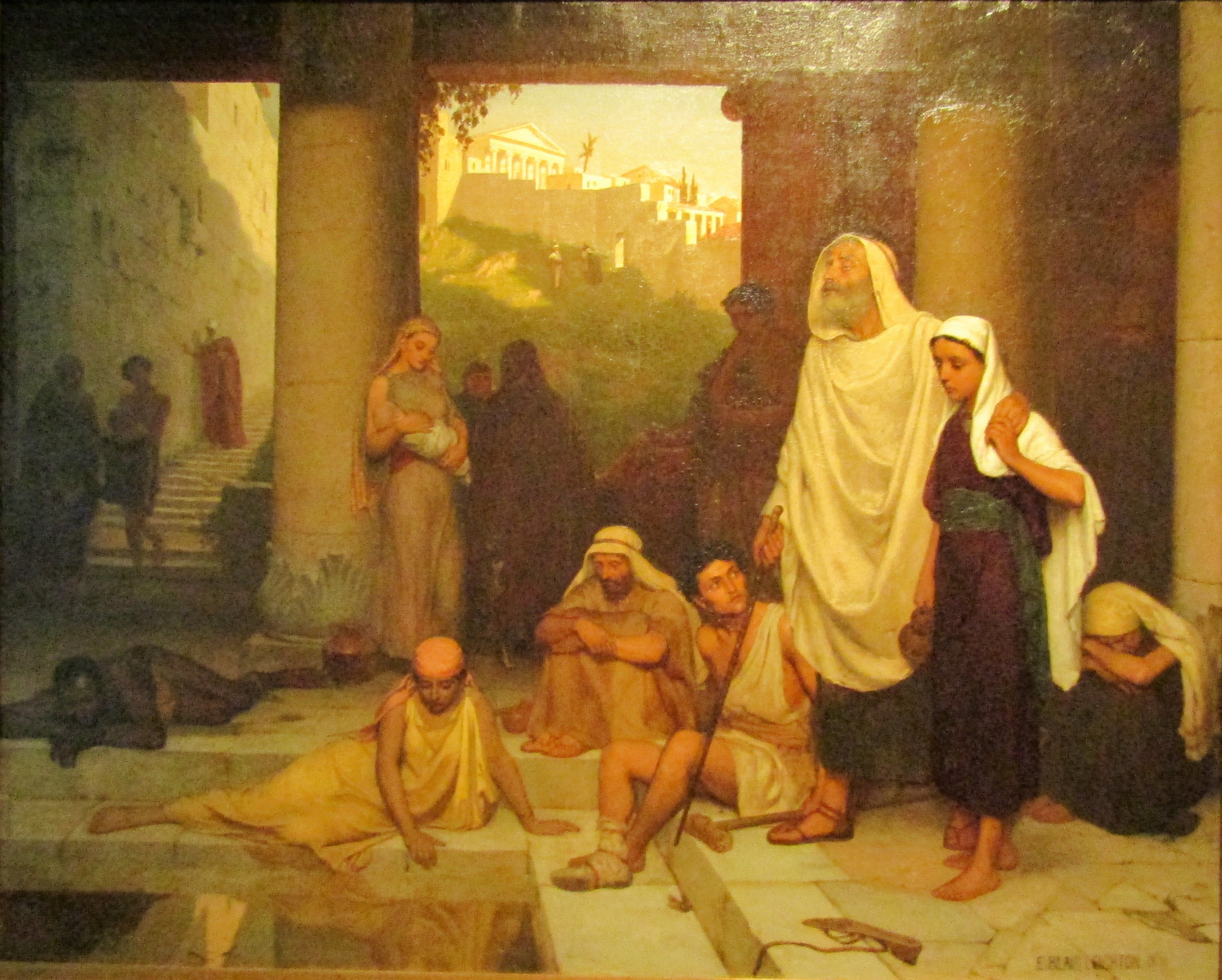
- Artist: Edmund Blair Leighton
- Year: 1879
- Medium: Oil on canvas
- Movement: Romanticism
- Dimensions: 102.2 cm × 127.8 cm (40.2 in × 50.3 in)
- Owner: Brigham Young University Museum of Art

The Blind Man at the Pool of Siloam by Edmund Blair Leighton was painted in 1879.

Leighton was one of the Romantics of the late Victorian era. He usually depicted medieval and Regency subjects, which were popular at the time. However, in The Blind Man at the Pool of Siloam he depicts a scene from the New Testament: John 9. After meeting a beggar who had been blind from birth who comes to hm in complete faith, Jesus anoints the man's eyes with clay formed from his own spittle and tells him to go wash in the pool of Siloam, a fresh water pool where Jewish pilgrims performed ritual purification. The man did as he was bid and received his sight by a miracle of God.

In The Blind Man at the Pool of Siloam, Leighton depicts the blind man approaching the pool from the right of the canvas, supported by a barefoot young child wearing a white cloth as a veil, in the moments before the miracle. He is surrounded by others who also seek the alleviation of suffering, people of all races, stages of life and circumstances. In the distance beyond the columns that surround the pool, led to by a staircase going up the hill, is a temple brightly lit by sunlight.

Rather than depicting the moment of or aftermath of this miracle, Leighton painted the grim prologue. The Brigham Young University Museum of Art says, "This painting humbly reminds us that every biblical miracle was preceded by anguish, which sometimes lasted for years. However, viewing this painting in context with John’s Gospel provides the promise that the Savior’s loving hand will momentarily come."

== Provenance ==
Leighton's uncle, John Boosey, purchased the painting directly from the artist. It was then sold to (Boot) from Christie's London on 16 December 1935 for 21 pounds. It was next sold from Sotheby's Parke-Bernet on 4 May 1979, then Sotheby's New York on 29 October 1981. The painting was with Kurt E. Schon Ltd., New Orleans, Louisiana, by 15 May 1985.

On 5 November 2014, The Blind Man at the Pool of Siloam was sold from Christie's, New York, for US$81,250 to join the collection of the Brigham Young University Museum of Art with funds provided by Jack R. Wheatley.

== See also ==
- Art Renewal Center, The Blind Man at the Pool of Siloam
