= John 9 =

- ← chapter 8 chapter 10 →
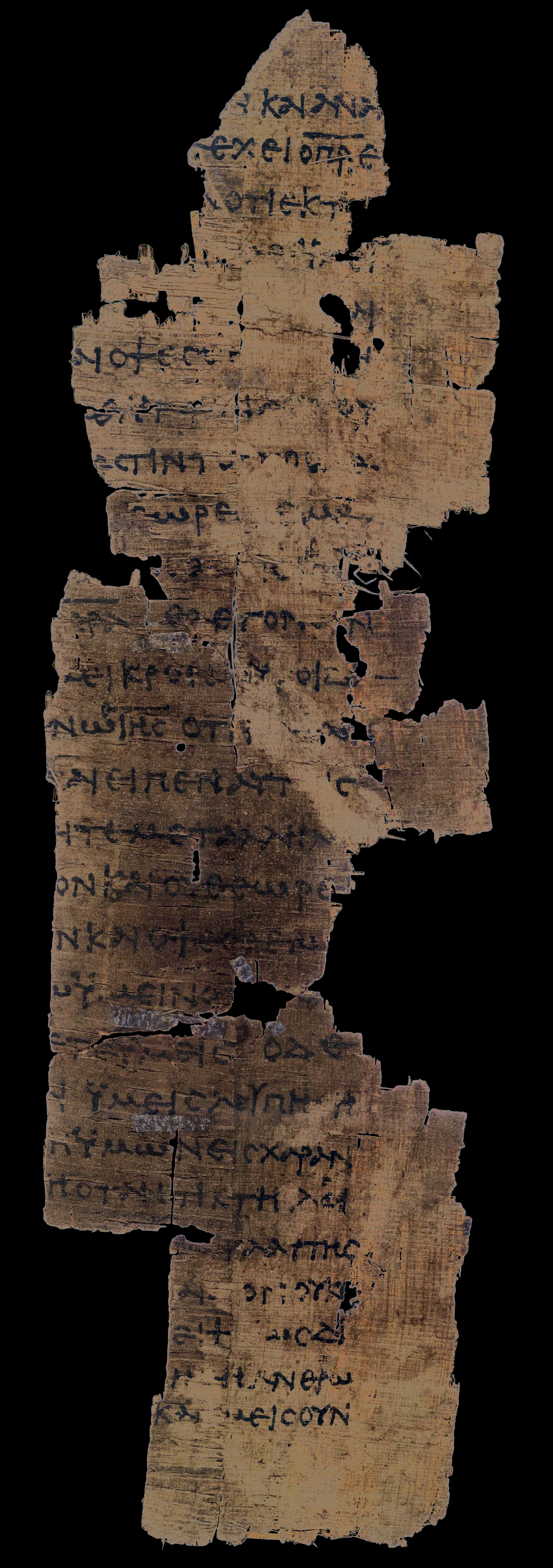
- John 16:14-22 on the recto side of Papyrus 5, written about AD 250
- Book: Gospel of John
- Category: Gospel
- Christian Bible part: New Testament
- Order in the Christian part: 4

John 9 is the ninth chapter of the Gospel of John in the New Testament of the Christian Bible. It maintains the previous chapter's theme "Jesus is light", recording the healing of an unnamed man who had been blind from birth, a miracle performed by Jesus, and their subsequent dealings with the Pharisees. The man born blind comes to complete faith in Jesus, while some of the Pharisees remain in their sin. The gospel identifies an unnamed "disciple whom Jesus loved" as its source and possible author. Early Christian tradition uniformly affirmed that John composed this Gospel.

== Text ==
The original text was written in Koine Greek. This chapter is divided into 41 verses. Some early manuscripts containing the text of this chapter are:

- Papyrus 75 (AD 175–225)
- Papyrus 66 (c. 200)
- Codex Vaticanus (325–350)
- Codex Sinaiticus (330–360)
- Codex Bezae (c. 400)
- Codex Alexandrinus (400–440)
- Codex Ephraemi Rescriptus (c. 450; extant verses 1–10)
- Papyrus 128 (6th/7th century; extant verses 3–4)

== Themes in this chapter ==
René Kieffer notes the similarity between this chapter and chapter 5, where another healing at a pool on the sabbath day is recounted. In chapter 9, the "progressive insight" of the man born blind is a central motif in the narrative. The messianic significance of the story is noted in the New English Translation. The progress of the narrative can be seen in the sub-headings used by the New King James Version:

- John 9:1–12 = A Man Born Blind Receives Sight
- John 9:13–34 = The Pharisees Excommunicate the Healed Man
- John 9:35–41 = True Vision and True Blindness

== Location ==
Jesus and His disciples are said to be "passing by" or "going along", and there is no indication yet that they have left Jerusalem, the scene of the narrative in chapters 7 and 8. Jesus sends the man he heals to the Pool of Siloam, a rock-cut pool on the southern slope of Jerusalem, located outside the walls of the Old City to the southeast. However, there are also references to a Jewish ruling that anyone who believed Jesus to be the Messiah would be excluded from the synagogue (John 9:22). There is no other New Testament reference to Jerusalem having a synagogue, but rabbinical tradition states that there were 480 synagogues in Jerusalem at the time of the Jewish rebellion.

== Chronology ==
The initial events of this chapter occur on a Sabbath (John 9:14), not necessarily connected with the Feast of Tabernacles or the days immediately afterwards when the events of John 7-8 took place. H. W. Watkins suggests that this was the last day, the "great day" of the Feast of Tabernacles referred to in John 7:37 because "nothing has taken place which makes it necessary to suppose any interval, and though the discourses seem long, they would have occupied but a short time in delivery", and the Pulpit Commentary agrees that "the day may have been a festival sabbath".

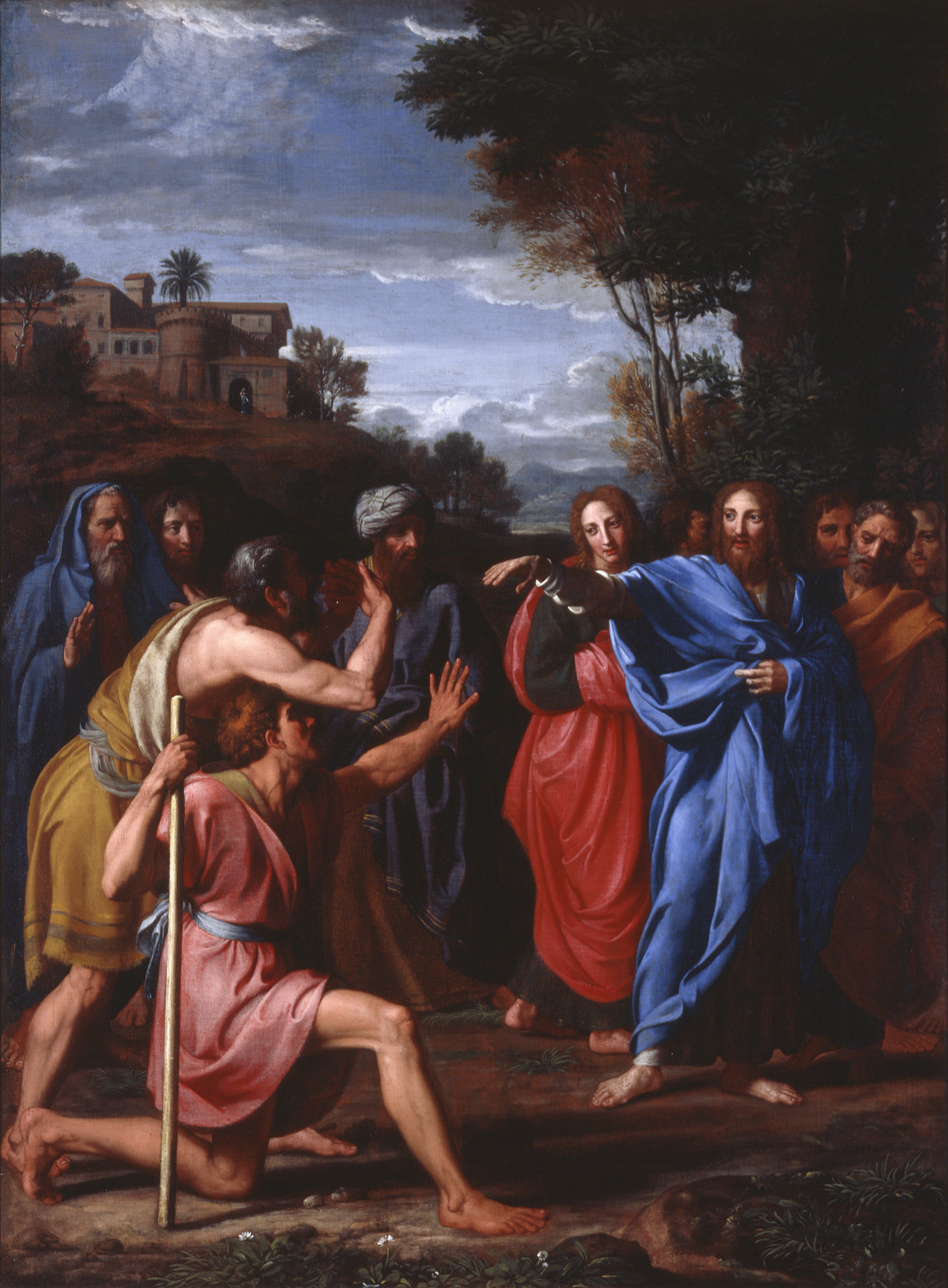
Christ healing the blind, by Nicolas Colombel, 1682

== Verses 1-4 ==
A discussion about suffering takes place between Jesus (here called "Rabbi") and his disciples. (Note: See also Names and titles of Jesus in the New Testament#Rabboni and Rabbi. The same term has also been used in John 4:31 and 6:25.) This leads to Jesus' announcement that:

I must work the works of Him who sent Me while it is day; the night is coming when no one can work.

This verse begins with "we must" (Greek: ἡμᾶς δεῖ, hēmas dei) in the Westcott-Hort version and in the Revised Standard Version and New International Version. The Textus Receptus and the Vulgate both use the singular, "I must" (Latin: Me oportet). The plural is "probably right". The reference to "Him who sent me" anticipates the evangelist's note that "Siloam means 'Sent' (verse 6), meaning that Jesus, who has been sent by his Father, "is also present in this water".

== Verse 14 ==
Now it was a Sabbath when Jesus made the clay and opened his eyes.

The circumstances are similar to the healing at Bethesda in John 5.

== Verse 22 ==
The Jews had agreed already that if anyone confessed that He (Jesus) was Christ, he would be put out of the synagogue.

"The word for ‘out of the synagogue’ (Greek: ἀποσυνάγωγος) is peculiar to John, occurring [in] John 12:42, John 16:2, and nowhere else". The decision has been linked to the possible Council of Jamnia which was once thought to have decided the content of the Jewish canon sometime in the late 1st century (c. 70–90 AD).

Verse 34 confirms that "they cast him out", the Amplified Bible and the New Living Translation adding text to refer to his exclusion from the synagogue.

== Verse 38 ==
Then he said, "Lord, I believe!" And he worshiped Him.

Pope Paul VI describes the faith evidenced in this verse as "firm and resolute, ... though always humble and diffident". A few manuscripts, such as Papyrus 75 and Codex Sinaiticus, omit the whole of verse 38 and the beginning of verse 39.

== See also ==
- Healing the man blind from birth
- Jesus Christ
- Pool of Siloam
- Other related Bible parts: 2 Kings 20, 2 Chronicles 32, Isaiah 8

== Notes ==
Preceded by John 8	Chapters of the Bible; Gospel of John	Succeeded by John 10
