= Papyrus 6 =

New Testament 4th century papyrus fragment of the Gospel of John in Greek and Coptic

Papyrus 𝔓^{6}
- New Testament manuscript
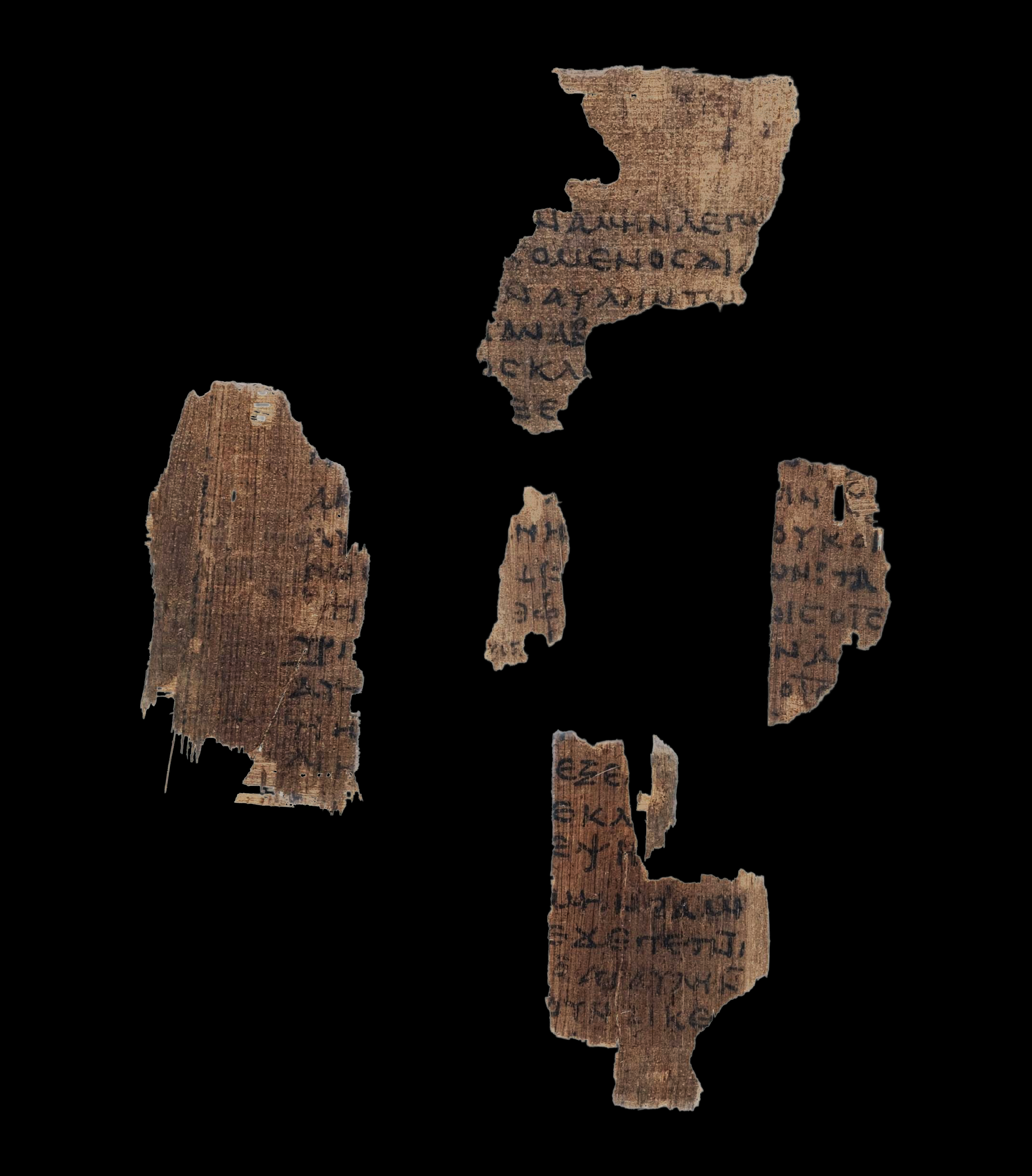
- John 10:1–10
- Text: John 10-11, 13 †; First Epistle of Clement, Epistle of James
- Date: c. 300-400
- Script: Greek-Coptic diglot
- Found: Egypt
- Now at: Bibliothèque nationale et universitaire
- Size: [28] x [15]
- Type: Alexandrian text-type
- Category: II

Papyrus 6 (in the Gregory-Aland numbering), designated by 𝔓^{6} or by ε 021 (in von Soden's numbering), is a fragmentary early copy of the New Testament in Greek and Coptic (Akhmimic). It is a papyrus manuscript of the Gospel of John that has been dated paleographically to the 4th century. The manuscript also contains text of the First Epistle of Clement, which is treated as a canonical book of the New Testament by the Coptic Church. The major part of the codex is lost.

The Greek text of the codex has several unusual textual variants.

== Description ==
The codex contains text of the First Epistle of Clement in Coptic (Akhmimic dialect) on the first 26 pages of the manuscript, Coptic Epistle of James on the pages 91–99, and Greek and Coptic Gospel of John on the page 100. Pages 27–90 have not survived. About 25 pages contained the rest of the text of the First Epistle of Clement and one page of text of James 1:1–12, but there were about 28 pages with unknown content. According to Friedrich Rösch there is not space for the Second Epistle of Clement.

The original size of pages probably measured 28 cm by 15 cm. According to the reconstruction the text of the codex was written in one column per page, 30 lines per page. It is written in uncial letters. The nomina sacra are written in an abbreviated way (ις̅, θυ̅).

About 200 fragments of the codex have survived. 15 fragments from the four original leaves contain the Greek text of the Gospel of John.

Contents

The Greek text of the codex contains: Gospel of John 10:1–2,4–7. 9–10; 11:1–8,45–52.

The Coptic (Akhmimic) text of the codex contains: First Epistle of Clement 1:1-26:2; John 10:1–12,20; 13:1–2,11–12; James 1:13–5:20.

== Text ==
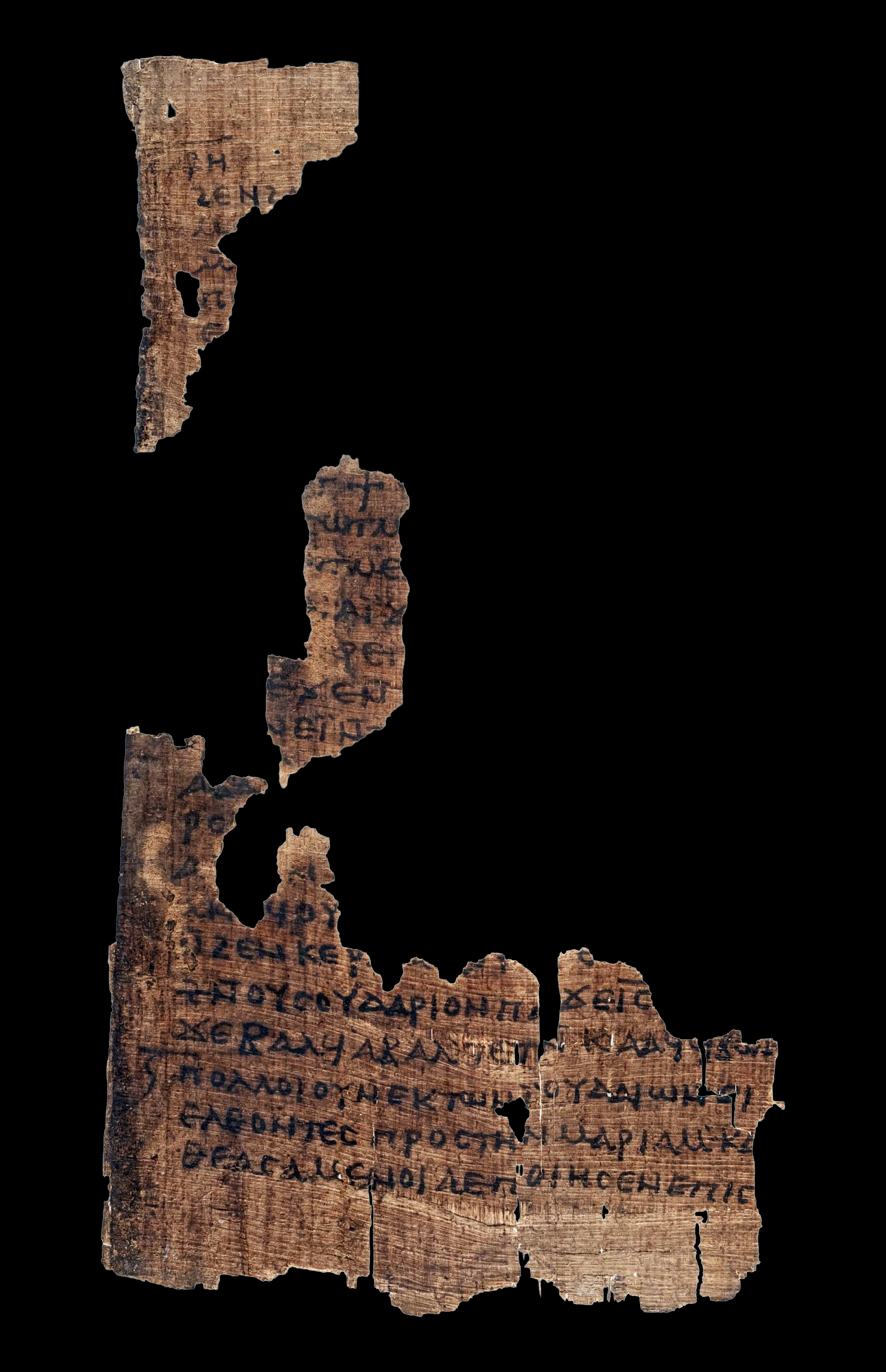
Fragments with text of John 11:45

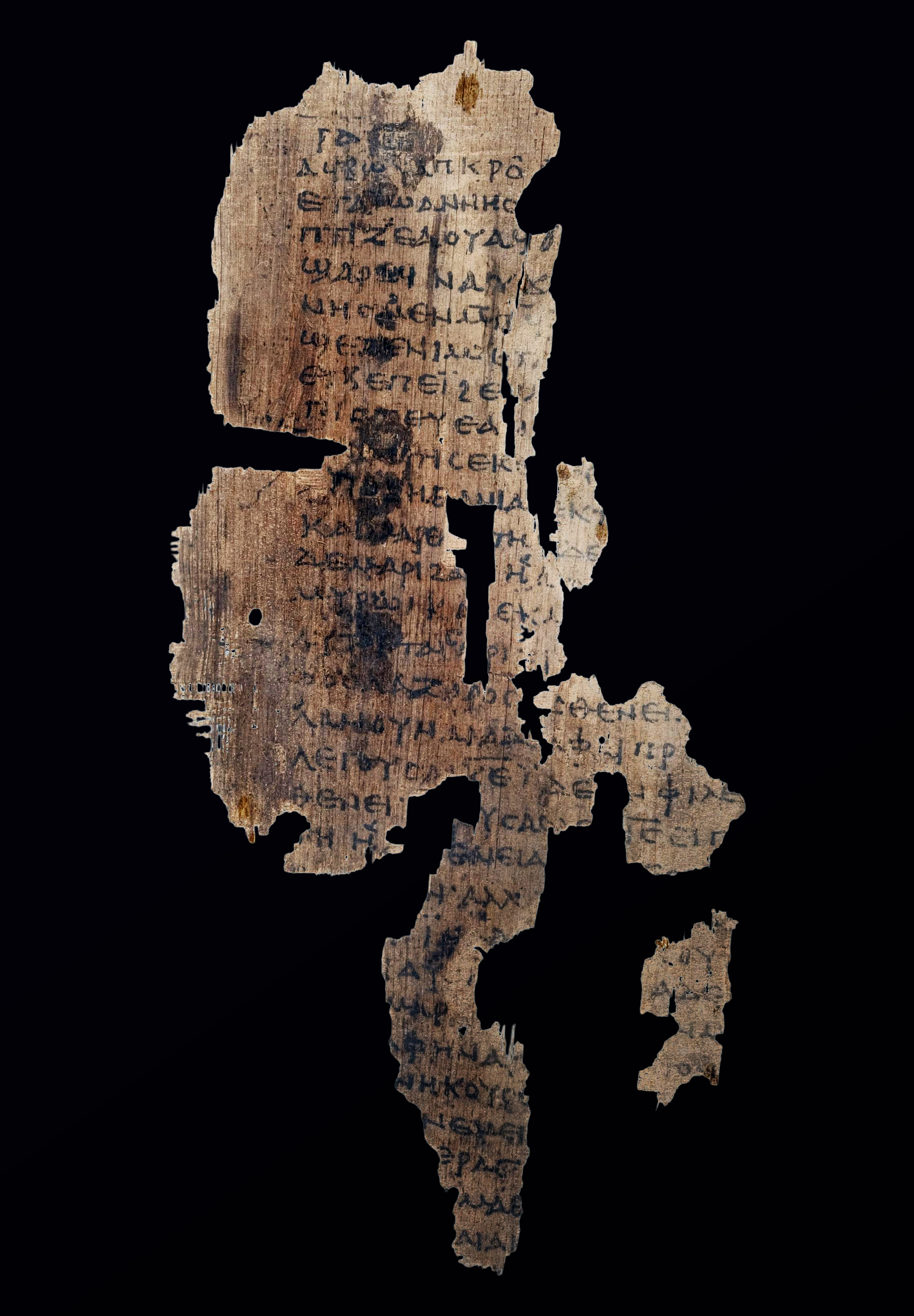
John 11:1–8

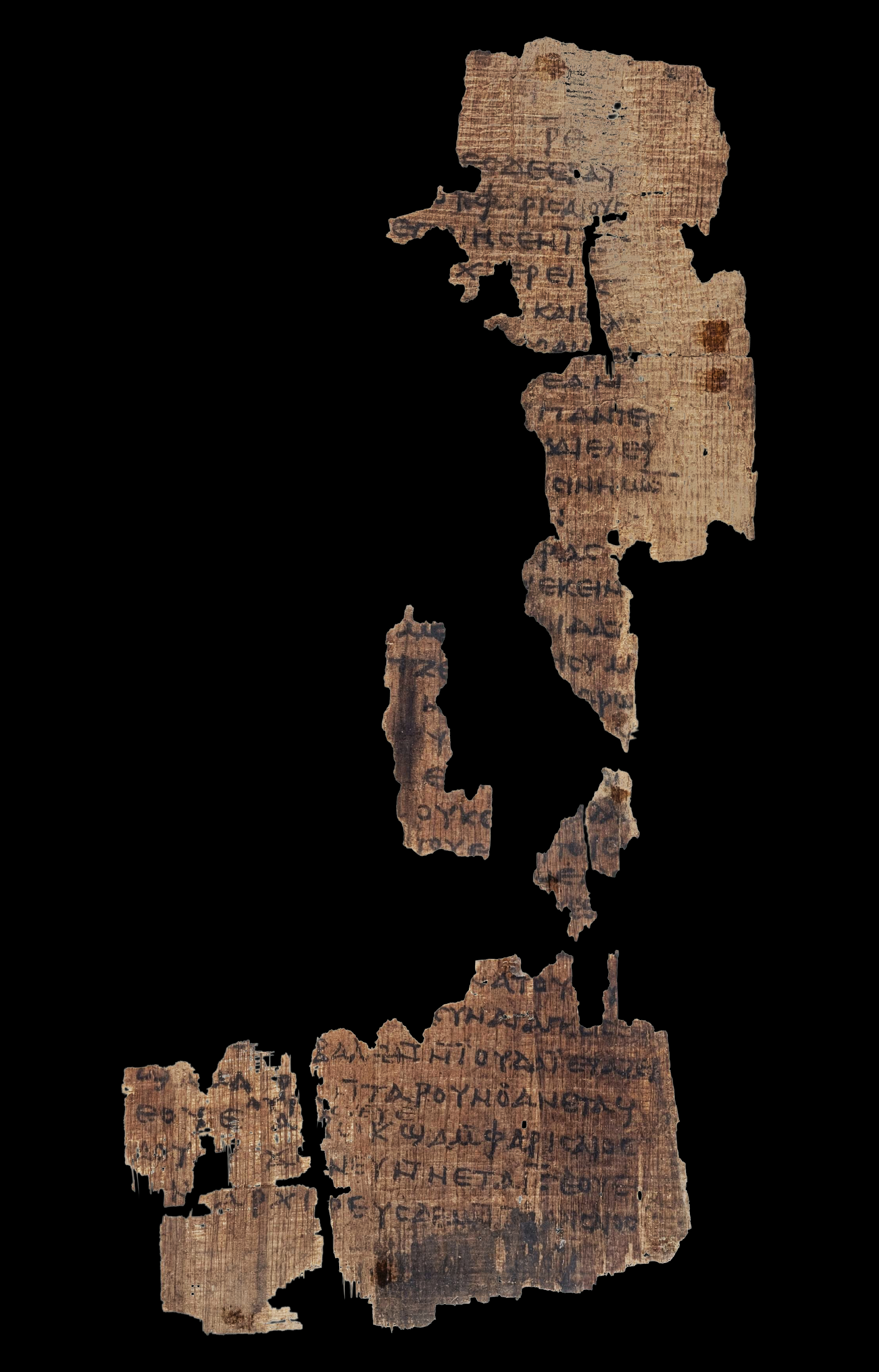
John 11:46–52

The Greek text of this codex is a representative of the Alexandrian text-type. Kurt Aland placed it in Category II of New Testament manuscripts, because it has some alien readings.

[τευσαν εις αυτον τιν]ες δε εξ αυ
[των απηλθον προς τ]ο̣υ̣ς φαρισαιους
[και ειπαν αυτοις α] επ̣ο̣ιησεν ις̅
[συνηγαγον ουν οι αρ]χι̣ερεις
[και οι φαρισαιοι συνεδριο]ν̣ και ελε
[γον τι ποιουμεν οτι ουτο]ς̣ ο̣ α̣ν̣θρ̣ω̣
[πος πολλα ποιει σημεια] εαν
[αφωμεν αυτον ουτως] παντες̣
[πιστευσουσιν εις αυτον] κ̣αι ελευ
[σονται οι ρωμαιοι και αρο]υ̣σιν ημων
[και τον τοπον και το εθνο]ς̣·
[εις δε τις εξ αυτων καια]φας
[αρχιερευς ων του ενιαυτο]υ̣ εκειν[ου
ειπεν αυτοις υ]με[ις ουκ] ο̣ιδατ̣[ε
ουδεν ουδε λο]γ̣ι̣ζε̣[σθε ο]τ̣ι συμ
[φερει υμιν ι]ν̣[α εις αν]θ̣ρω
[πος αποθαν]η̣ υ[περ του λαο]υ̣
[και μη ολον το] ε[θνος αποληται του
το δε αφ εαυτου] ουκ ε̣[ιπεν] α̣λλα̣
[αρχιερευς ων] του ε[νια]υ̣του̣ εκ̣[ει
νου επροφητευσεν οτι ε]μ̣ελ̣λ̣ε̣[ν
ις̅ αποθνησκειν υπερ το]υ̣ εθ̣[νους]
[και ουχ υπερ του εθνους μονον
αλλ ινα και τα τεκ]ν̣α του [θ]υ̣̅ [τα
διεσκορπισμενα] συναγαγη ε̣ι̣ς ε̣ν̣

In John 10:4–5 it has singular word order τ[ην φωνην των αλλο]τριων. Other manuscripts have reading την φωνην αυτου αλλοτριω or αυτου την φωνην αλλοτριω.

In John 10:5 it reads ακολουθησωσιν, the reading of the codex is supported by the manuscripts: Sinaiticus, Regius, Washingtonianus, Koridethi, Athous Lavrensis, 0250. The alternative reading ακολουθησουσιν occur in the manuscripts A, B, D, Δ, 700, and other.

In John 10:6 it has singular reading τι ην α for τι; the reading of the codex is not supported by any other manuscript.

In John 10:10 it has unique addition: δ]ε (between ο and κλεπτης) – ο δε κλεπτης instead of ο κλεπτης.

In John 11:1 it reads ην δε τις εκει for ην δε τις; the reading of the codex is not supported by any other manuscript.

In John 11:2 name Mariam has an unusual spelling with using Coptic letters (Mariham).

In John 11:5 it has singular reading της μαρθαν και την αδελφεν αυτης.

In John 11:45 it has reading οι ελθοντες προς την Μαριαμ along with the manuscripts Papyrus 59, Vaticanus, Ephraemi, Regius, minuscule 33; other manuscripts read οι ελθοντες μετα Μαριαμ.

== History ==
Caspar René Gregory did not try to estimate its date. Friedrich Rösch suggested the 5th or 6th century, according to him the earlier date of the codex is excluded by presence 1 Epistle of Clement. Some scholars date it even so late as 7th-8th century. Currently it is dated by the INTF to the 4th century. It is difficult to date the manuscript on the palaeographical ground because of its fragmentary nature.

The manuscript was discovered in Egypt. It was the second manuscript with translation 1 Epistle of Clement into Coptic and the first in Akhmimic dialect. The Greek text of the codex was published by Gregory in 1908. Friedrich Rösch published the text of the whole manuscript Coptic and Greek in 1910.

It is currently housed at the Bibliothèque nationale et universitaire (Pap. copt. 379. 381. 382. 384) in Strasbourg.

== See also ==
- John 10, John 11
- List of New Testament papyri
- Coptic versions of the Bible
