= Latter Day Saint views on Mary =

Religious movement

The Latter Day Saint movement teaches that Mary was the mother of Jesus. Latter Day Saints affirm the virgin birth of Jesus but reject the doctrine of the perpetual virginity of Mary. They also believe that the brothers of Jesus were her and Joseph's biological children. Mary is not seen as an intercessor between humankind and Jesus, and Latter Day Saints do not pray to Mary. The Book of Mormon, part of the Latter Day Saint's open canon of scripture, refers to Mary by name in prophecies of her mission, and describes her as "most beautiful and fair above all other virgins" and as a "precious and chosen vessel."

In the first edition of the Book of Mormon (1830), Mary was referred to as "the mother of God, after the manner of the flesh," a reading that was changed by Joseph Smith to "the mother of the Son of God" in subsequent editions (1837–).

Latter Day Saints also believe that God the Father is the literal father of Jesus Christ, although how Jesus's conception was accomplished has not been authoritatively established.
