= Papyrus 44 =

Papyrus 𝔓^{44}
- New Testament manuscript
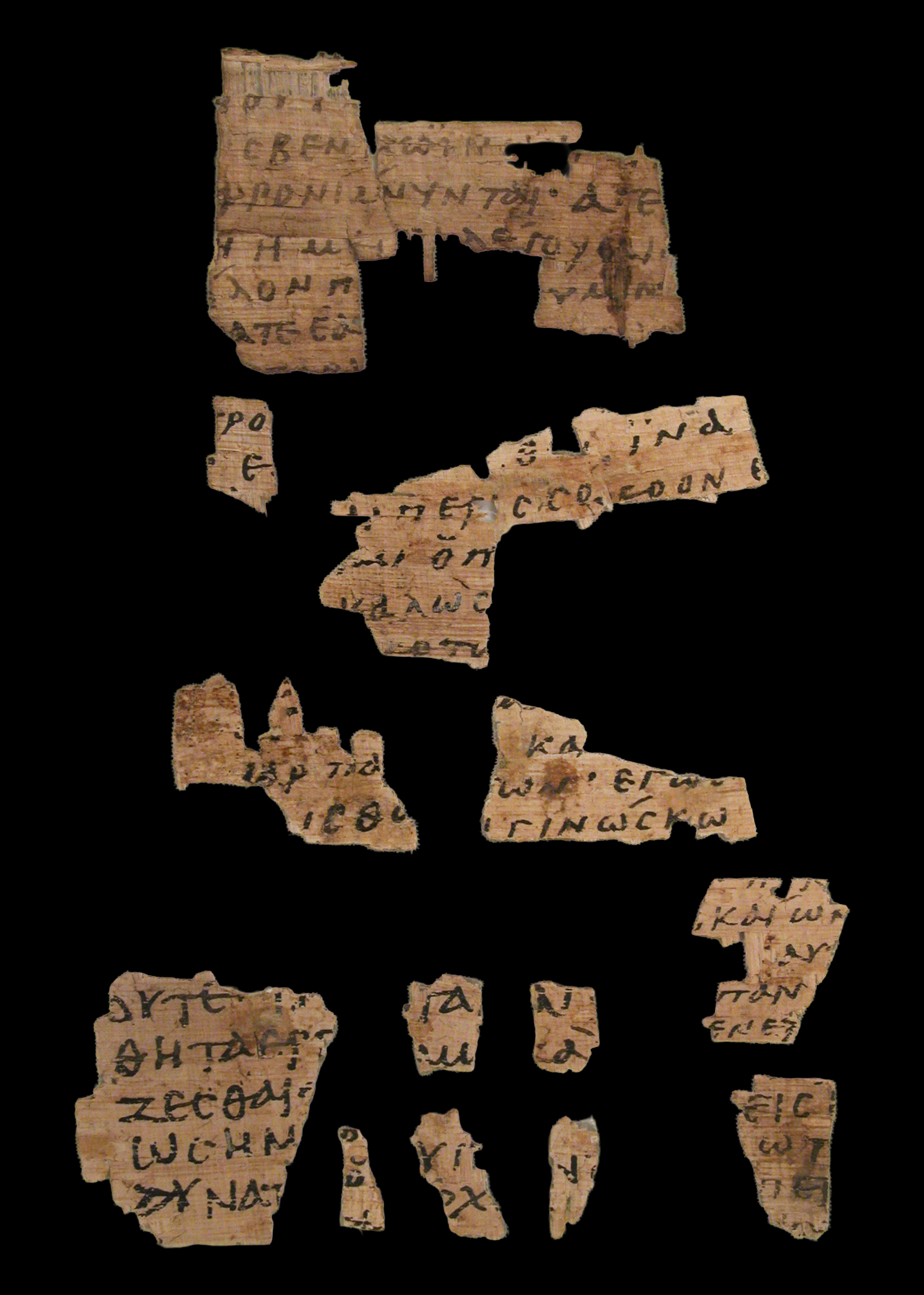
- Recto Matthew 25:8-10, John 10:8-14
- Text: Matthew 17-18,25 and John 10
- Date: 6th/7th century
- Script: Greek
- Found: Egypt
- Now at: Metropolitan Museum of Art
- Cite: W. E. Crum, H. G. Evelyn-White, The Monastery of Epiphanius at Thebes, Metropolitan Museum of Art, Egyptian Expedition Publications IV, (New York, 1926), pp. 120-121.
- Type: Alexandrian text-type
- Category: II

Papyrus 44 (in Gregory-Aland numbering), signed by 𝔓^{44}, is an early copy of the New Testament in Greek. It is a papyrus manuscript of the Gospel of Matthew and Gospel of John. It contains Matt. 17:1-3.6-7; 18:15-17.19; 25:8-10 and John 10:8-14. Fragments of the Gospel of John formerly known as Papyrus 44b (containing 9:3-4; 12:16-18) have been reclassified as Papyrus 128. The manuscript paleographically has been assigned to the 6th or 7th century.

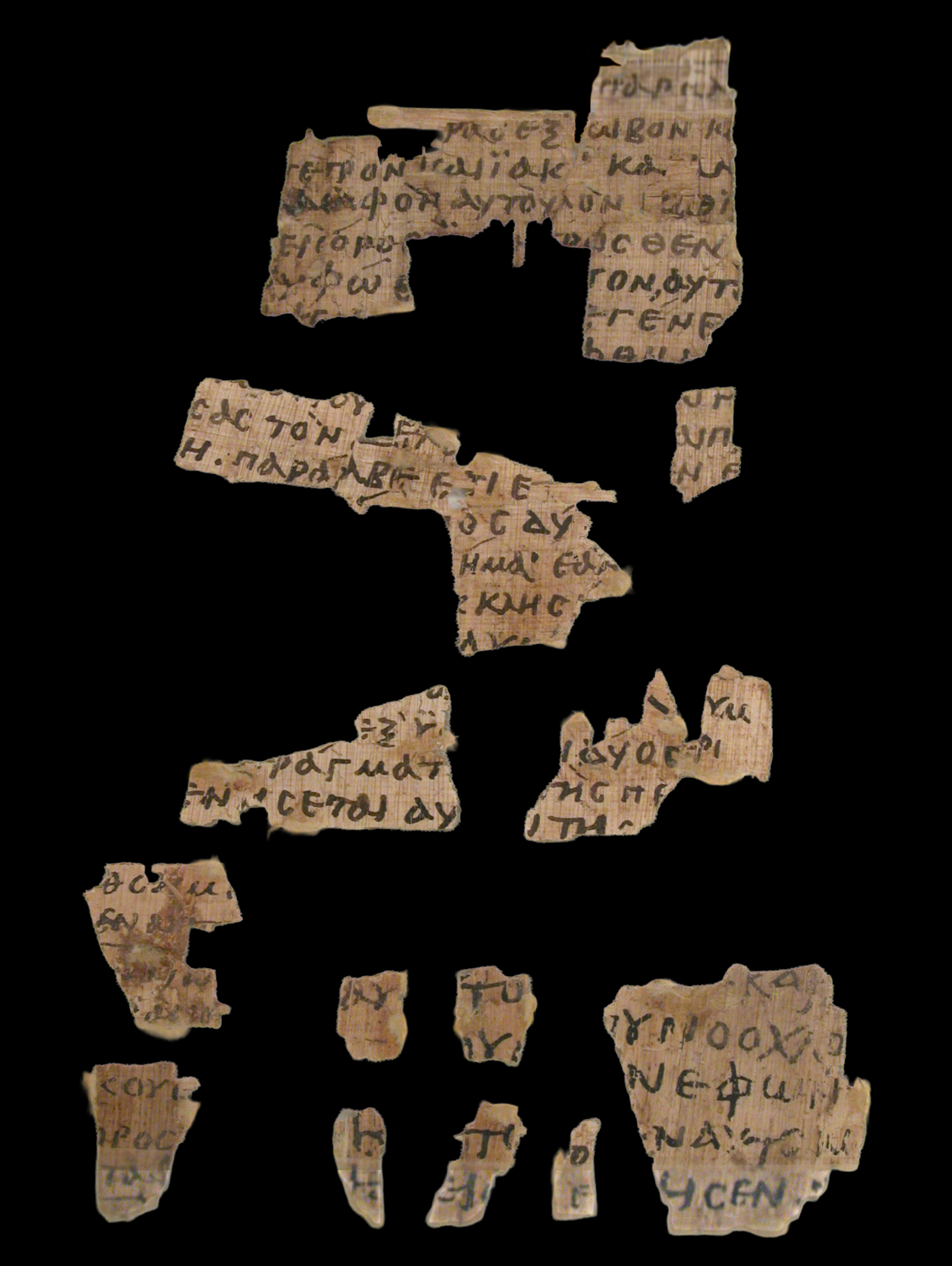
Verso Matthew 17:1-3, 17:6-7, 18:15-17, 18:19

The Greek text of this codex is a representative of the Alexandrian text-type. Aland placed it in Category II.

It is currently housed at the Metropolitan Museum of Art (Inv. 14. 1. 527) in New York.

== See also ==
- List of New Testament papyri
