= John 11 =

- ← chapter 10 chapter 12 →
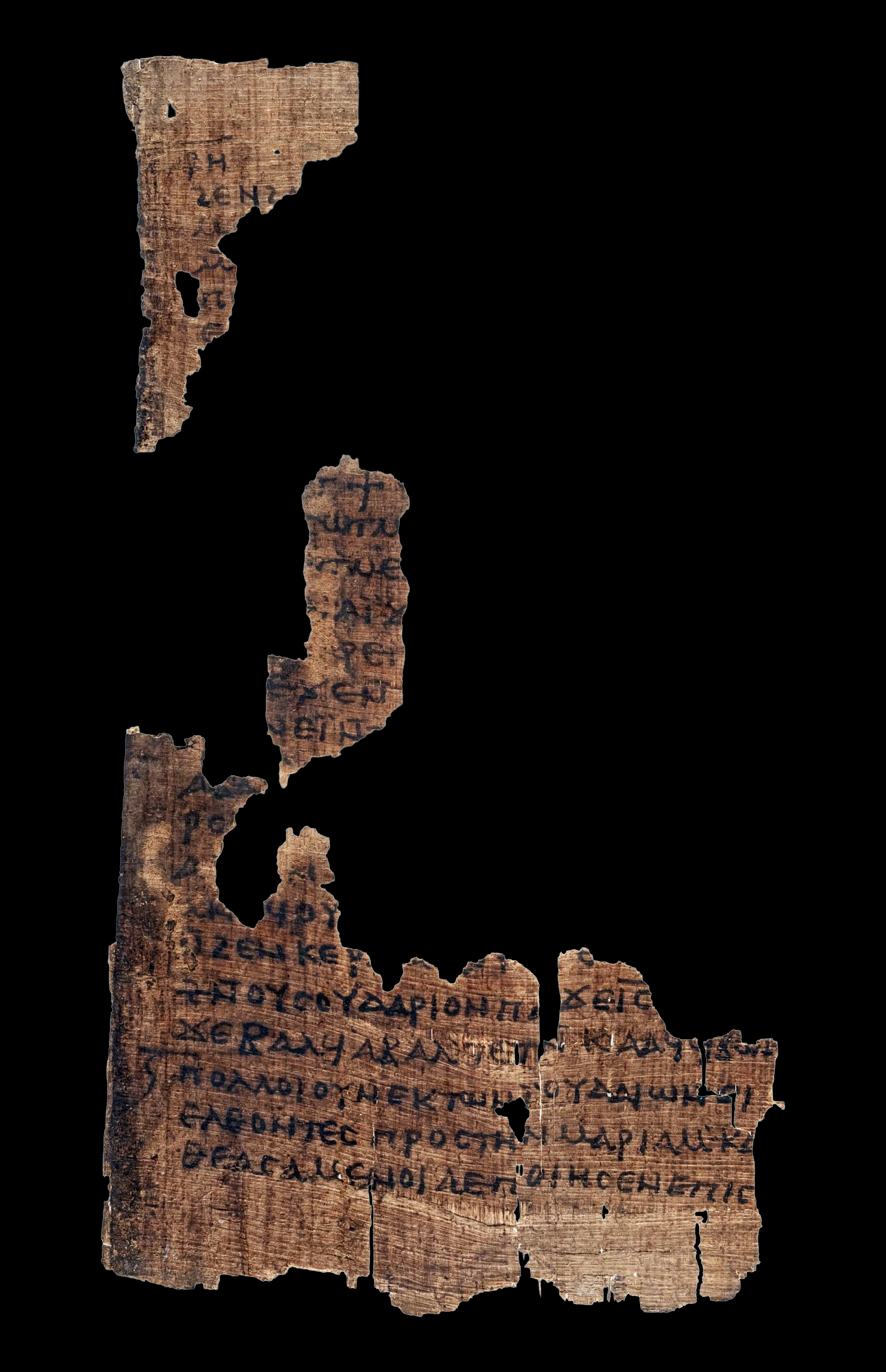
- John 11:45 in Papyrus 6, written about AD 350
- Book: Gospel of John
- Category: Gospel
- Christian Bible part: New Testament
- Order in the Christian part: 4

John 11 is the eleventh chapter of the Gospel of John in the New Testament of the Christian Bible. It records the raising of Lazarus from the dead, a miracle of Jesus Christ, and the subsequent development of the chief priests' and Pharisees' plot against Jesus. The gospel identifies an unnamed "disciple whom Jesus loved" as its source and possible author. Early Christian tradition uniformly affirmed that John composed this Gospel.

== Text ==
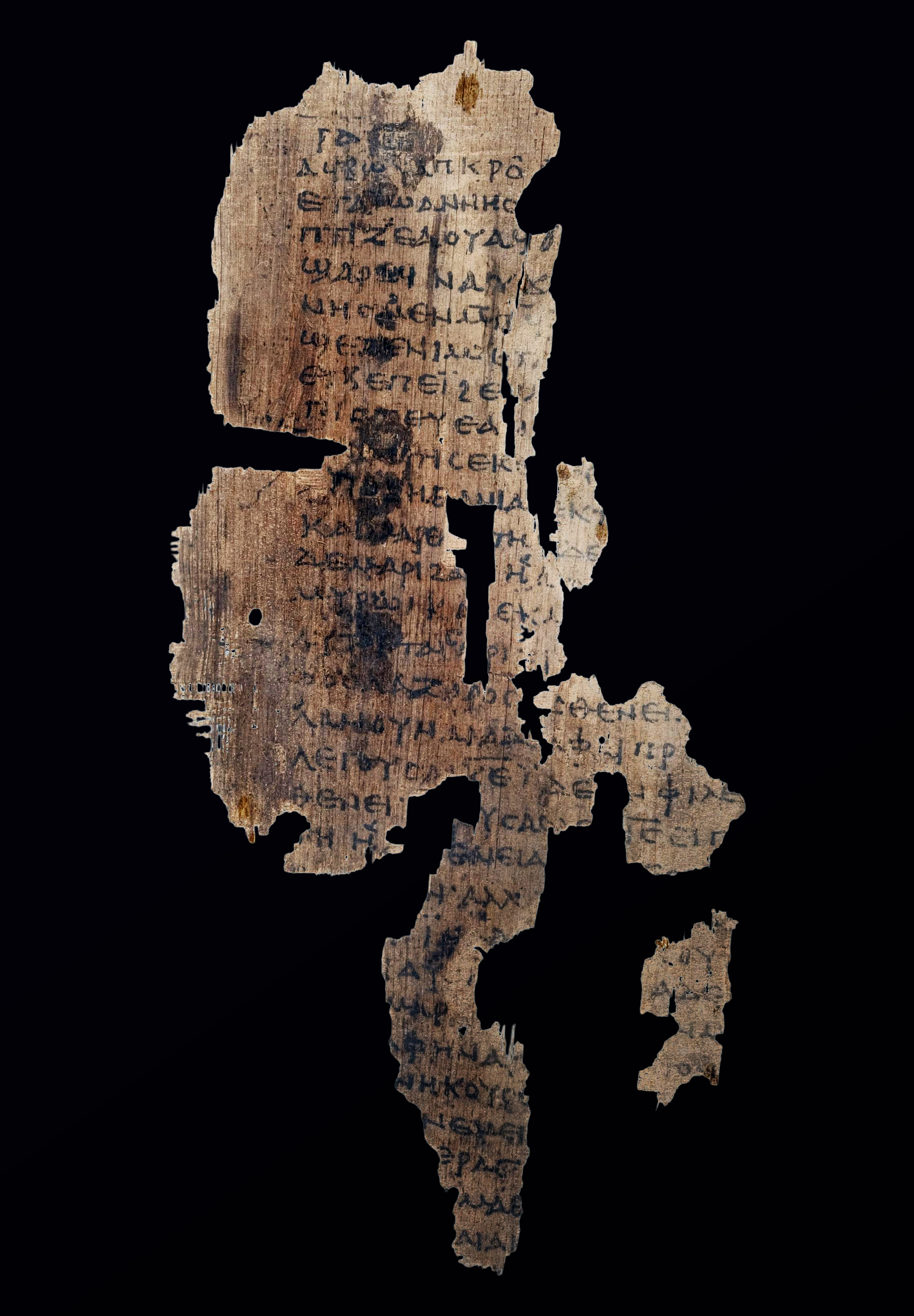
John 11:1–8

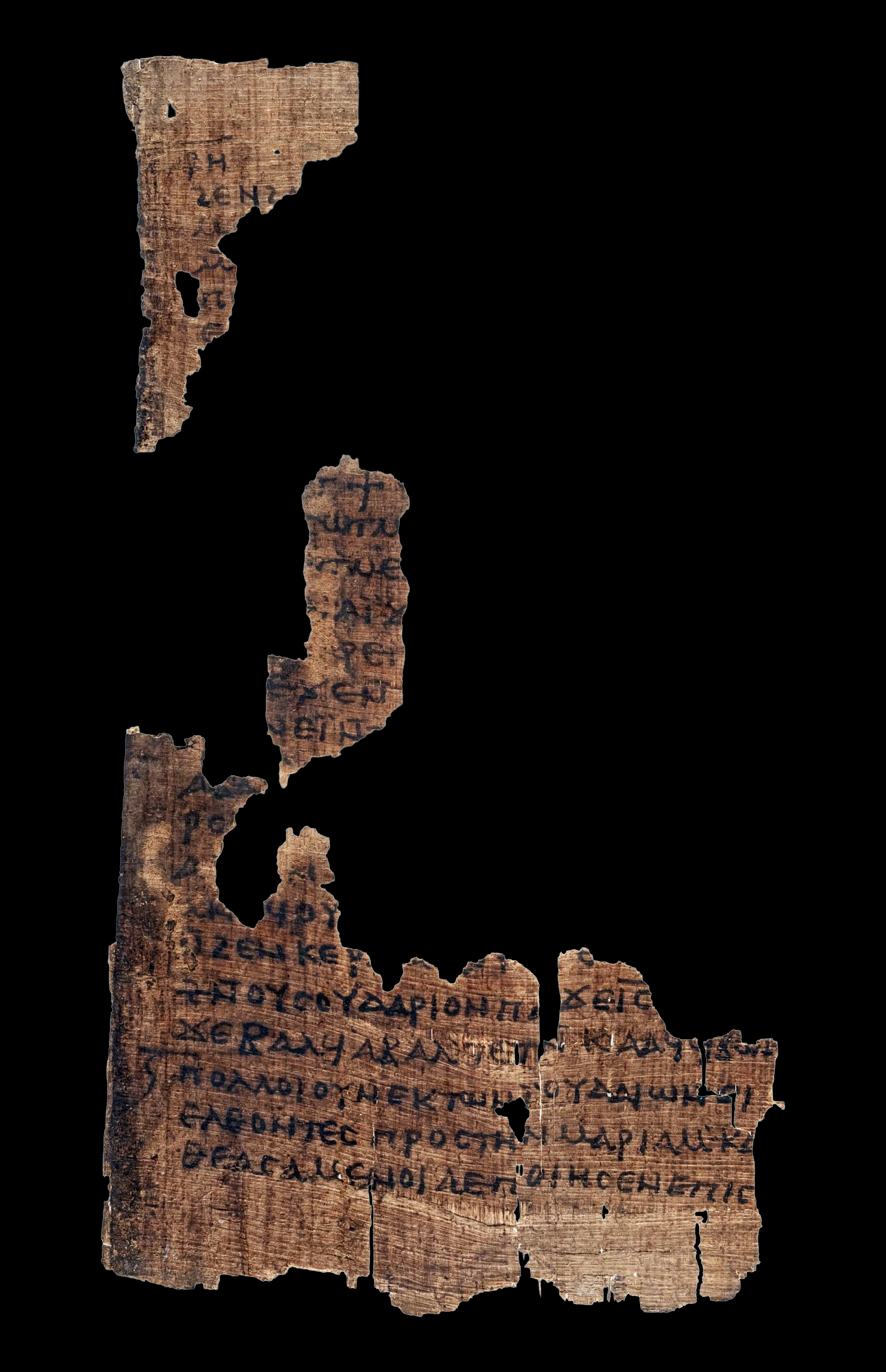
John 11:45

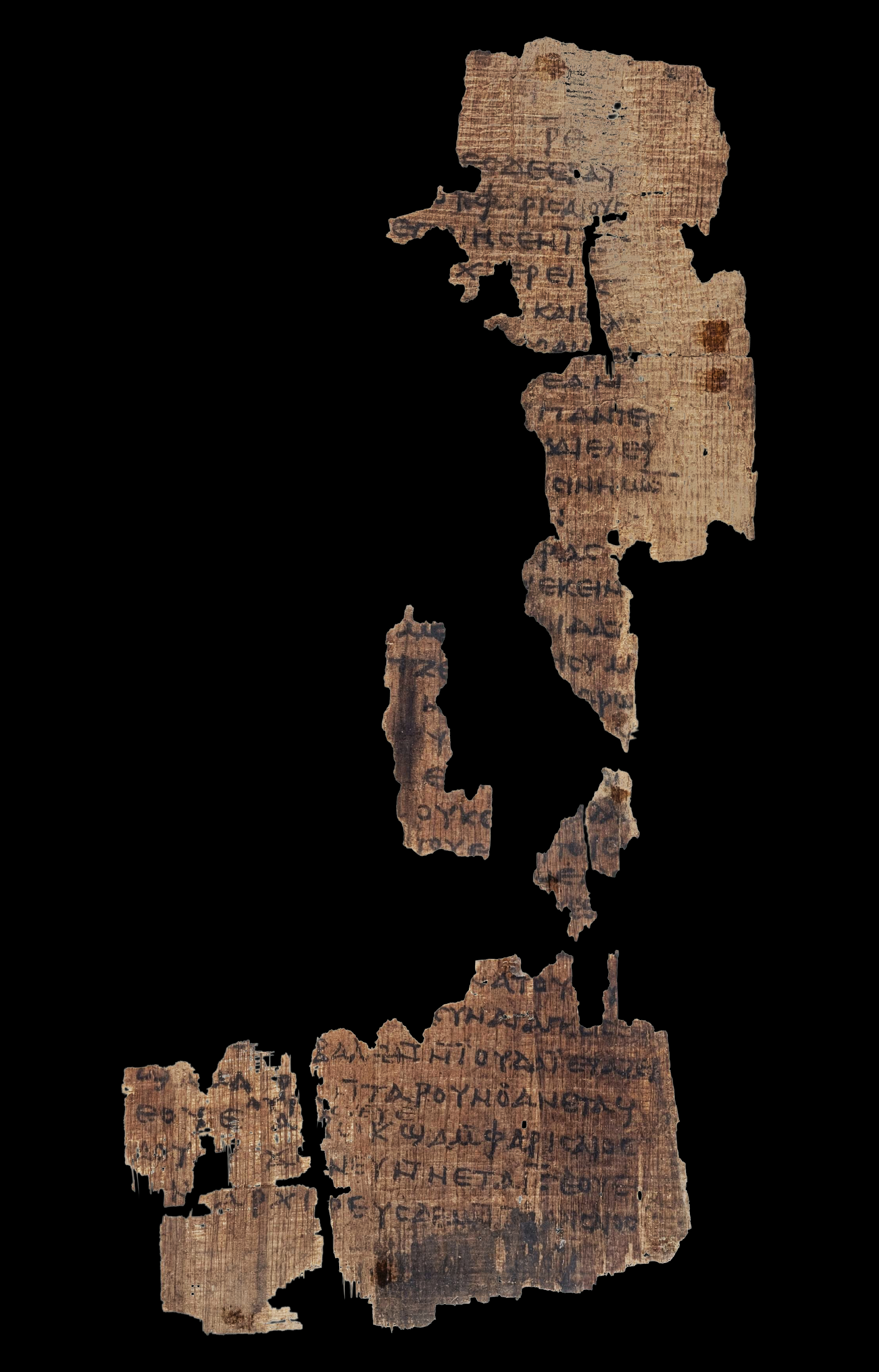
John 11:46–52

Fragments of Papyrus 6 (c. AD 350)

The original text was written in Koine Greek. This chapter is divided into 57 verses. Some early manuscripts containing the text of this chapter are:

- Papyrus 75 (AD 175–225)
- Papyrus 66 (c. 200)
- Codex Vaticanus (325–350)
- Papyrus 6 (c. 350; extant verses in Greek: 1–8, 45–52; in Coptic: all)
- Codex Sinaiticus (330–360)
- Codex Bezae (c. 400)
- Codex Alexandrinus (400–440)
- Codex Ephraemi Rescriptus (c. 450; extant verses 8-46)
- Papyrus 59 (7th century; extant verses 40–52)

== Places ==
Events recorded in this chapter refer to the following locations:

- The eastern side of the Jordan River, "the place where John the Baptist was baptizing at first". (John 10:40–42)
- Bethany (John 11:1), about 15 stadia (15 furlongs or 2 miles) away from Jerusalem (John 11:18)
- Jerusalem, where it can be assumed that the council of the Chief Priests and Pharisees met (John 11:47), and where people began to gather for the impending Passover (John 11:55).
- Ephraim in the wilderness, where Jesus and His disciples stayed to avoid the plotting of the Pharisees and Chief Priests (John 11:54)

== Lazarus ==
=== Introduction of Lazarus (verse 1) ===
Now a certain man was sick, Lazarus of Bethany, the town of Mary and her sister Martha.

Chapter 10 ended with Jesus leaving Jerusalem as the Jews threatened to stone him, and travelling to the east of the river Jordan. The evangelist's introduction of Lazarus of Bethany at this point (John 11:1) leads to the discussion of whether Jesus should return to Judea (Jerusalem) in the face of the growing plot against Him. Mary and her sister Martha appear to have been better known than their brother Lazarus, as he is introduced by reference to them. Theologian Joseph Benson therefore suggests that "It is probable [that] Lazarus was younger than his sisters".

=== Connecting the feet-anointing, Mary, and Lazarus (verse 2) ===
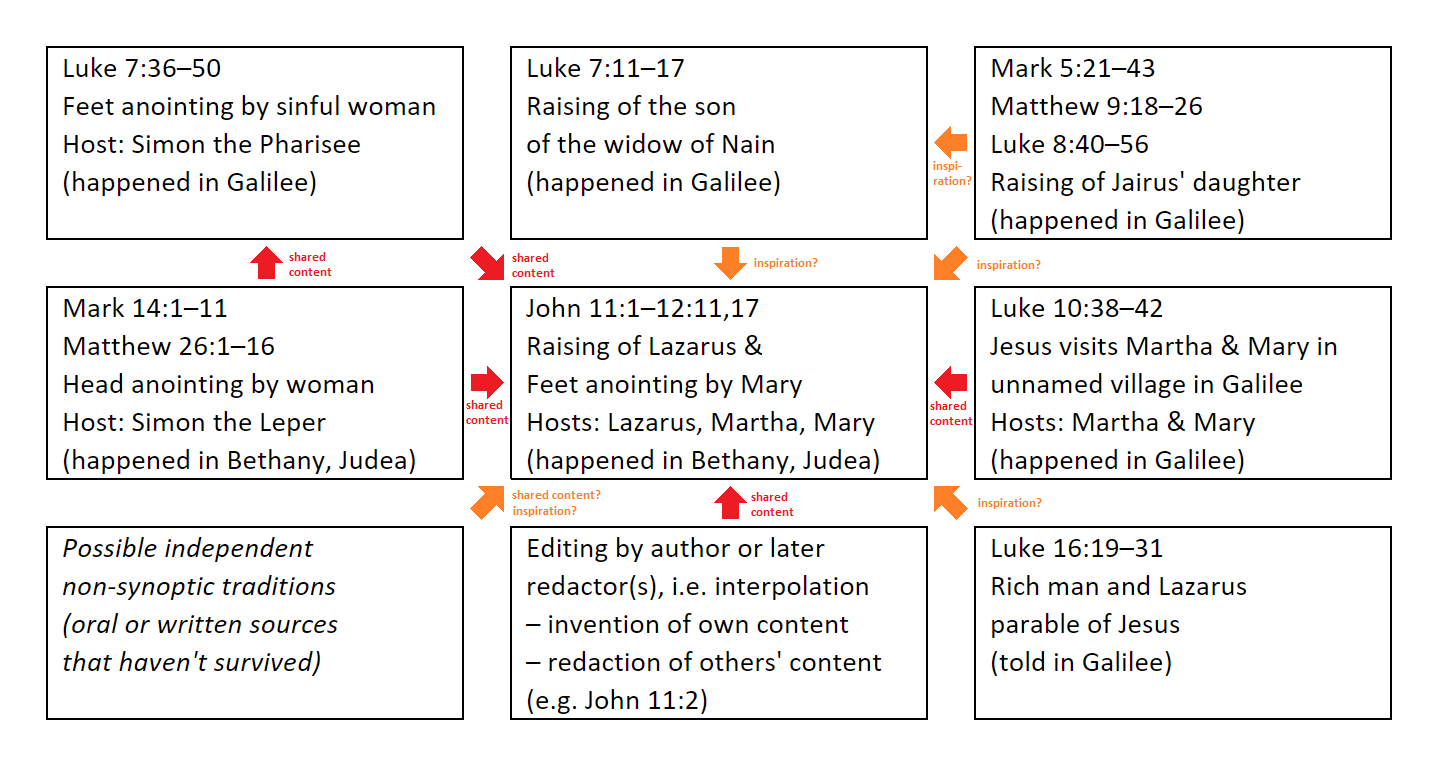
New Testament scholars have sought to explain how the story of Lazarus was probably composed.

(This Mary, whose brother Lazarus now lay sick, was the same one who poured perfume on the Lord and wiped his feet with her hair.)

Verse 2, which many translations put within parentheses, is at the centre of much scholarly controversy. New Testament scholars try to establish how John's narrative of the raising of Lazarus and the subsequent feet-anointing of Jesus by Mary of Bethany (John 11:1–12:11,17) was composed by seeking to explain its apparent relationships with the older textual traditions of the Synoptic Gospels (Mark, Matthew, and Luke). The author of John seems to have combined elements from several – apparently originally unrelated – stories into a single narrative. These include the unnamed woman's head-anointing of Jesus in Bethany (Mark 14, Matthew 26), the sinful woman's feet-anointing (and hair-wiping) of Jesus in Galilee (Luke 7; these first two may have a common origin, the Lukan account likely being derived from Mark), Jesus' visit to Martha and Mary in the unnamed Galilean village (Luke 10), Jesus' parable of the rich man and Lazarus (Luke 16), and possibly others involving Jesus' miraculous raising of the dead (the raising of Jairus' daughter and the raising of the son of the widow of Nain). Meanwhile, other elements were removed or replaced; for example, Simon the Leper/Simon the Pharisee was replaced by Lazarus as the host of the feast in Jesus' honour, and Bethany in Judea was chosen as the setting, while most elements of John's narrative correspond to traditions that the Synoptics set in Galilee. Scholars pay particular attention to verse John 11:2 (and verse John 11:1), which may represent an effort by the author or a later redactor to stress a connection between these stories that is, however, not found in the older canonical gospels. They further note that the actual anointing will not be narrated until verse John 12:3, and that neither Mary, nor Martha, nor the village of these sisters, nor any anointing is mentioned in the Gospel of John before this point, suggesting that the author (or redactor) assumes the readers already have knowledge of these characters, this location and this event, and wants to tell them that these were connected (which he apparently knew the readers did not commonly know/believe yet) long before giving the readers more details. Elser and Piper (2006) posited that verse John 11:2 is evidence that the author of the Gospel of John deliberately mixed up several traditions in an 'audacious attempt (...) to rework the collective memory of the Christ-movement'. The author did not strive to give a historically accurate account of what had happened, but instead, for theological purposes, combined various existing narratives in order to construct Lazarus, Mary and Martha of Bethany as a prototypical Christian family, whose example is to be followed by Christians.

=== Verse 3 ===
Therefore the sisters sent to Him, saying, "Lord, behold, he whom You love is sick."

The sisters send messengers to Jesus, so his location cannot have been entirely secret, "firmly expect[ing] that he, who had cured so many strangers, would willingly come and give health to one whom he so tenderly loved". The words of their message made reference only to Lazarus' sickness, leaving unexpressed, but "to be inferred, the consequent, therefore come to our help". Johann Bengel notes that John often expects the reader to make such inferences, such as in John 2:3: "When they wanted wine, the mother of Jesus saith unto Him, 'They have no wine' [leaving the consequent unexpressed, but implied, Do Thou relieve them]". Commentators generally understand that the sisters expected Jesus would come to Bethany despite the personal danger to Himself, with which His disciples were more concerned (John 11:8), although Exclusive Brethren theologian John Nelson Darby notes that "He might have said the word, as in the case of the centurion, and of the sick child at the beginning of this Gospel (John 4:46–53)". Jesus' love for Lazarus is noticed by the Jews in verse 36.

=== Twelve hours in the day (verses 8–10) ===
In reply to the disciples' concerns about Jesus returning to Judea, where very recently (Greek: νῦν, nun), 'just now' (English Standard Version) or 'lately' (New King James Version) the Jews had wanted to stone Him, He answered:

"Are there not twelve hours in the day? If anyone walks in the day, he does not stumble, because he sees the light of this world. But if one walks in the night, he stumbles, because the light is not in him." (11:9–10)

The νῦν shows that they had not been long in Perea, on the east of the Jordan. "The Jews divided the day from sunrise to sunset into twelve equal parts". Heinrich Meyer suggests that "the sense of the allegorical answer is this: 'The time appointed to me by God for working is not yet elapsed; as long as it lasts, no one can do anything to me; but when it shall have come to an end, I shall fall into the hands of my enemies, like him who walketh in the night, and who stumbleth, because he is without light'. In this way Jesus sets aside the anxiety of His disciples, on the one hand, by directing their attention to the fact that, as His time is not yet expired, He is safe from the apprehended dangers; and, on the other, by reminding them (John 11:10) that He must make use of the time apportioned to Him, before it come to an end".

=== Location of Bethany (verse 18) ===
Now Bethany was nigh unto Jerusalem, about fifteen furlongs off,

The evangelist tells his readers where Bethany is in relation to Jerusalem: 15 furlongs or (Greek: 15 stadia) is about 2 miles (3.2 km). Some translations say "not quite two miles". This Bethany is clearly distinguished from the Bethany beyond the Jordan where John the Baptist baptised, mentioned in John 1:28.

=== Dialogue between Jesus and Martha (verses 20–27) ===
^{25}Jesus said to her (Martha), "I am the resurrection and the life. He who believes in Me, though he may die, he shall live".
^{26}"And whoever lives and believes in Me shall never die. Do you believe this?"

In verse 27, "Martha expresses a complete faith in Jesus":

"Yes, Lord, I believe that you are the Messiah, the Son of God, the one who was expected to come into the world."

This is "the faith which the evangelist himself wants to promote", and which is his sole purpose in composing his gospel: These miracles have been written so that you will believe that Jesus is the Messiah, the Son of God, and so that you will have life by believing in him.

=== Jesus wept (verse 33–37) ===
==== Verse 35 ====
Jesus wept.

== The plot to kill Jesus ==
Verses 45–57 enlarge upon the threat to kill Jesus which has been developing over several chapters: John 5:16–18 and 7:1 relate the Jews' intention to have him killed when an opportunity might arise; verses 8:59 and 10:31 indicate more impulsive action: "they took up stones ... to stone Him". According to verse 11:47, "the chief priests and the Pharisees gathered a council" (Greek: συνέδριον, synedrion or Sanhedrin). René Kieffer notes that "the main concern of the council is to avoid the destruction of the holy place (which at the time the evangelist wrote had already happened)".

=== Verses 50-52 ===
"You do not realize that it is better for you that one man die for the people than that the whole nation perish."

Caiaphas, the Jewish high priest "that year", urges the council to sacrifice one man to save the whole nation. "Better, or expedient, for you" is rendered "better for us" or "expedient for us" in the Textus Receptus and some English translations. The evangelist describes Caiaphas' words as a prophecy: Jesus would die for the Jewish nation, and not only for that nation but also for the scattered children of God, to bring them together and make them one. Meyer notes that he prophesied "involuntarily". Raymond E. Brown comments that this says more than Caiaphas himself intended, but (with dramatic irony) no less than what the Gospel writer intended. The intention to gather the children of God into one is reflected in Jesus' own high priestly words, "that they may all be one" (John 17:21).

== Jesus' withdrawal to Ephraim (verse 54) ==
Therefore Jesus no longer walked openly among the Jews, but went from there into the country near the wilderness, to a city called Ephraim, and there remained with His disciples.

The New King James Version and World English Bible call Ephraim a "city", whereas the New International Version and the New Living Translation call it a "village". Eusebius places Ephraim 8 miles (13 km) north-east of Jerusalem, whereas Jerome places it 20 miles (32 km) to the north-east; both make it the same as Ephron. Irish Archbishop John McEvilly suggests that the time Jesus spent here was a period of preparation for the forthcoming events detailed in the ensuing chapters of the Gospel.

== Verses 56-57 ==
They kept looking for Jesus, and as they stood in the temple courts they asked one another, "What do you think? Isn't he coming to the festival at all?"

McEvilly states that

It is disputed, who they were that thus spoke, whether the friends or enemies of our Lord. Most likely, the latter, as appears from the following words (verse 57): The Chief Priests and the Pharisees had given a commandment etc.

In John 12:12, it is "the great crowd that had come for the festival" who hear and respond to the confirmation that he "is on his way".

== See also ==
- Bethany
- Lazarus
- Jesus Christ
- Jesus wept
- Mary
- Martha
- Related gospel chapters: Matthew 26, Mark 14, Luke 19, Luke 22

Preceded by John 10	Chapters of the Bible; Gospel of John	Succeeded by John 12
