= Papyrus 128 =

- New Testament manuscript
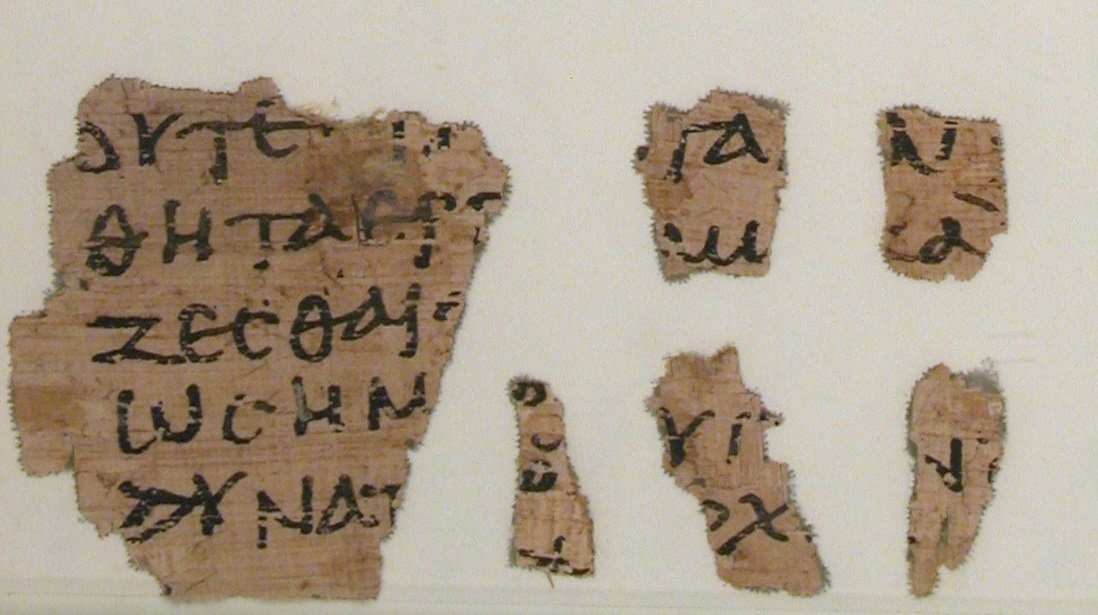
- Fragments containing John 9:3-4
- Sign: 𝔓^{128}
- Text: John 9:3–4, 12:16–18
- Date: 6th–7th century
- Script: Greek
- Found: Monastery of Saint Epiphanius, Egypt
- Now at: Metropolitan Museum of Art
- Type: ?
- Category: none

Papyrus 128 is a copy of a small part of the New Testament in Greek. It is a papyrus manuscript of the Gospel of John, containing verses 9:3-4; 12:16-18. It is designated by the siglum 𝔓^{128} in the Gregory-Aland numbering of New Testament manuscripts. Using the study of comparative writing styles (palaeography), it has been assigned to the 6th or 7th century CE.

It was formerly listed as a part of Papyrus 44 (𝔓^{44}). Both are currently housed at the Metropolitan Museum of Art (Inv. 14. 1. 527) in New York.

== Transcription of Text ==
John 9:3–4

ουτε οι γ[ονεις αυτου αλλ ινα φανερω]
θη τα εργ[α του θ̅υ̅ εν αυτω εμε δει εργα]
ζεσθαι τ[α εργα το]υ π[εμψαντος με ε]
ως ημ[ερα εστιν ε]ρχ[εται νυξ οτε ουδεις]
δυνατ [– – – – – – – – – – – – – – – – – ]

John 12:12–13

[– – ] ερ[χεται ο ι̅ς̅ εις ιεροσολυμα ελαβον τα
β]αϊα [– – – – – – – – – – – – – – – – – – ]

John 12:16–18

[– – – – – – – – – – – – – – – ] ε[ν]α και [ταυ]
[τα εποιησαν αυτω εμαρτυρει] ουν ο οχλο[ς
ο ων μετ αυτου] οτε [τον Λαζαρο]ν εφων[η]
[σεν εκ του μνημ]ειο[υ και ηγειρ]εν αυτον
[εκ νεκρων δια τουτο και υπηντ]ησεν α[– – –]

== See also ==
- List of New Testament papyri
