= History of Western civilization =

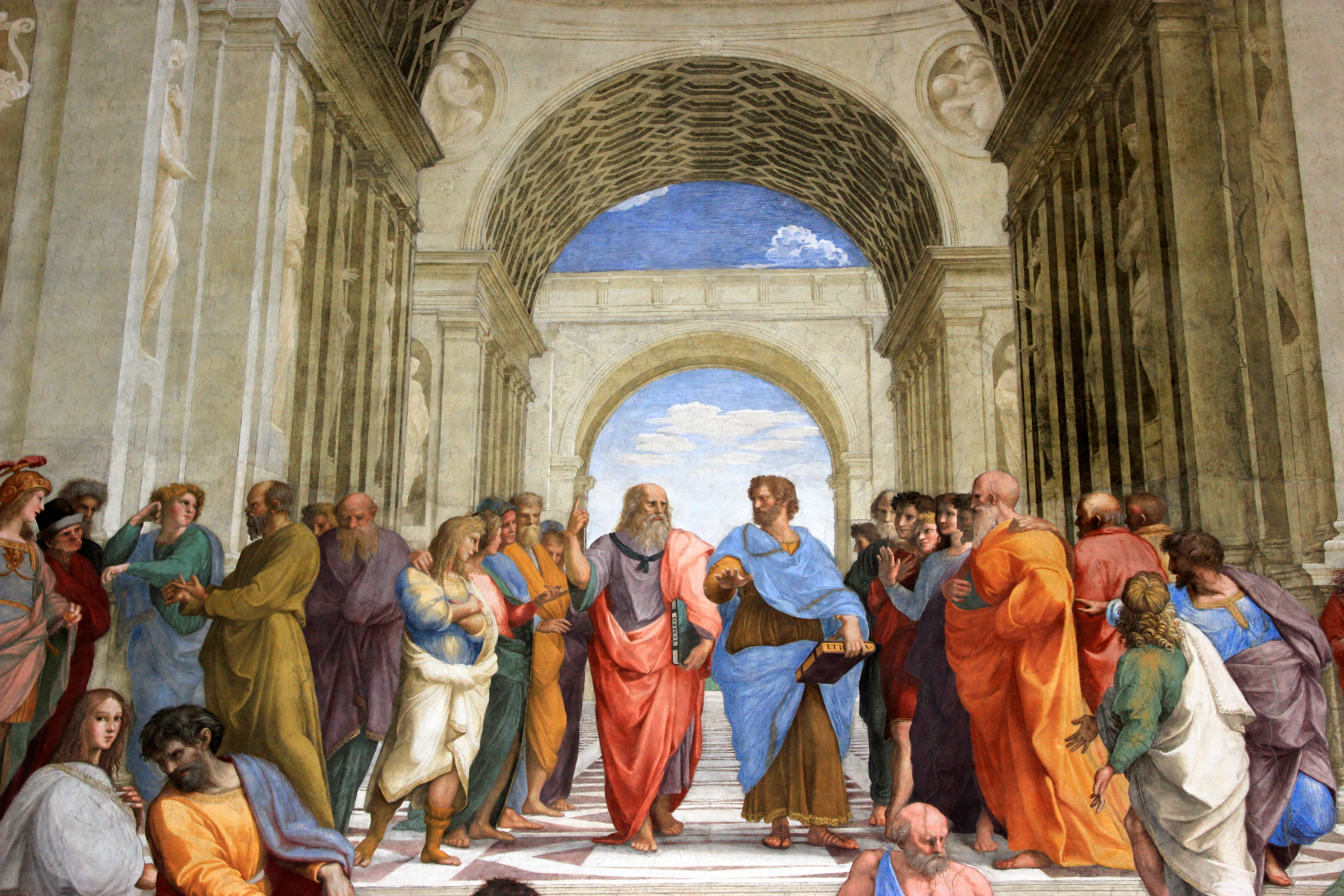
The School of Athens, a famous fresco by the Italian Renaissance artist Raphael, with Plato and Aristotle as the central figures in the scene

Western civilization traces its roots back to Europe and the Mediterranean. It began in ancient Greece, transformed in ancient Rome, and evolved into medieval Western Christendom before experiencing such seminal developmental episodes as the development of Scholasticism, the Renaissance, the Reformation, the Scientific Revolution, the Enlightenment, the Age of Revolution, the Industrial Revolution, and the development of liberal democracy. The civilizations of classical Greece and Rome are considered seminal periods in Western history. Major cultural contributions also came from the Christianized Germanic peoples, such as the Longobards, the Franks, the Goths, and the Burgundians. Charlemagne founded the Carolingian Empire and he is referred to as the "Father of Europe". Contributions also emerged from pagan peoples of pre-Christian Europe, such as the Celts and Germanic pagans as well as some significant religious contributions derived from Judaism and Hellenistic Judaism stemming back to Second Temple Judea, Galilee, and the early Jewish diaspora; and some other Middle Eastern influences. Western Christianity has played a prominent role in the shaping of Western civilization, which throughout most of its history, has been nearly equivalent to Christian culture. (There were Christians outside of the West, such as China, India, Russia, Byzantium and the Middle East). Western civilization has spread to produce the dominant cultures of modern Americas and Oceania, and has had immense global influence in recent centuries in many ways.

Following the 5th century Fall of Rome, Europe entered the Middle Ages, during which period the Catholic Church filled the power vacuum left in the West by the fall of the Western Roman Empire, while the Eastern Roman Empire (or Byzantine Empire) endured in the East for centuries, becoming a Hellenic Eastern contrast to the Latin West. By the 12th century, Western Europe was experiencing a flowering of art and learning, propelled by the construction of cathedrals, the establishment of medieval universities, and greater contact with the medieval Islamic world via Al-Andalus and Sicily, from where Arabic texts on science and philosophy were translated into Latin. Christian unity was shattered by the Reformation from the 16th century. A merchant class grew out of city states, initially in the Italian peninsula (see Italian city-states), and Europe experienced the Renaissance from the 14th to the 17th century, heralding an age of technological and artistic advance and ushering in the Age of Discovery which saw the rise of such global European empires as those of Portugal and Spain.

The Industrial Revolution began in Britain in the 18th century. Under the influence of the Enlightenment, the Age of Revolution emerged from the United States and France as part of the transformation of the West into its industrialised, democratised modern form. The lands of North and South America, South Africa, Australia and New Zealand became first part of European empires and then home to new Western nations, while Africa and Asia were largely carved up between Western powers. Laboratories of Western democracy were founded in Britain's colonies in Australasia from the mid-19th centuries, while South America largely created new autocracies. In the 20th century, absolute monarchy disappeared from Europe, and despite episodes of Fascism and Communism, by the close of the century, virtually all of Europe was electing its leaders democratically. Most Western nations were heavily involved in the First and Second World Wars and protracted Cold War. World War II saw Fascism and Nazism defeated in Europe, and the emergence of the United States and Soviet Union as rival global powers and a new "East-West" political contrast.

Other than in Russia, the European empires disintegrated after World War II and civil rights movements and widescale multi-ethnic, multi-faith migrations to Europe, the Americas and Oceania lowered the earlier predominance of ethnic Europeans in Western culture. European nations moved towards greater economic and political co-operation through the European Union. The Cold War ended around 1990 with the collapse of Soviet-imposed Communism in Central and Eastern Europe. In the 21st century, the Western World retains significant global economic power and influence. The West has contributed a great many technological, political, philosophical, artistic and religious aspects to modern international culture: having been a crucible of Catholicism, Protestantism, democracy, industrialisation; the first major civilisation to seek to abolish slavery during the 19th century, the first to enfranchise women (beginning in Australasia at the end of the 19th century) and the first to put to use such technologies as steam, electric and nuclear power. The West invented cinema, television, radio, telephone, the automobile, rocketry, flight, electric light, the personal computer and the Internet; produced artists such as Michelangelo, Shakespeare, Leonardo da Vinci, Beethoven, Vincent van Gogh, Picasso, Bach and Mozart; developed sports such as soccer, cricket, golf, tennis, rugby and basketball; and transported humans to an astronomical object for the first time with the 1969 Apollo 11 Moon Landing.

== The Origin ==
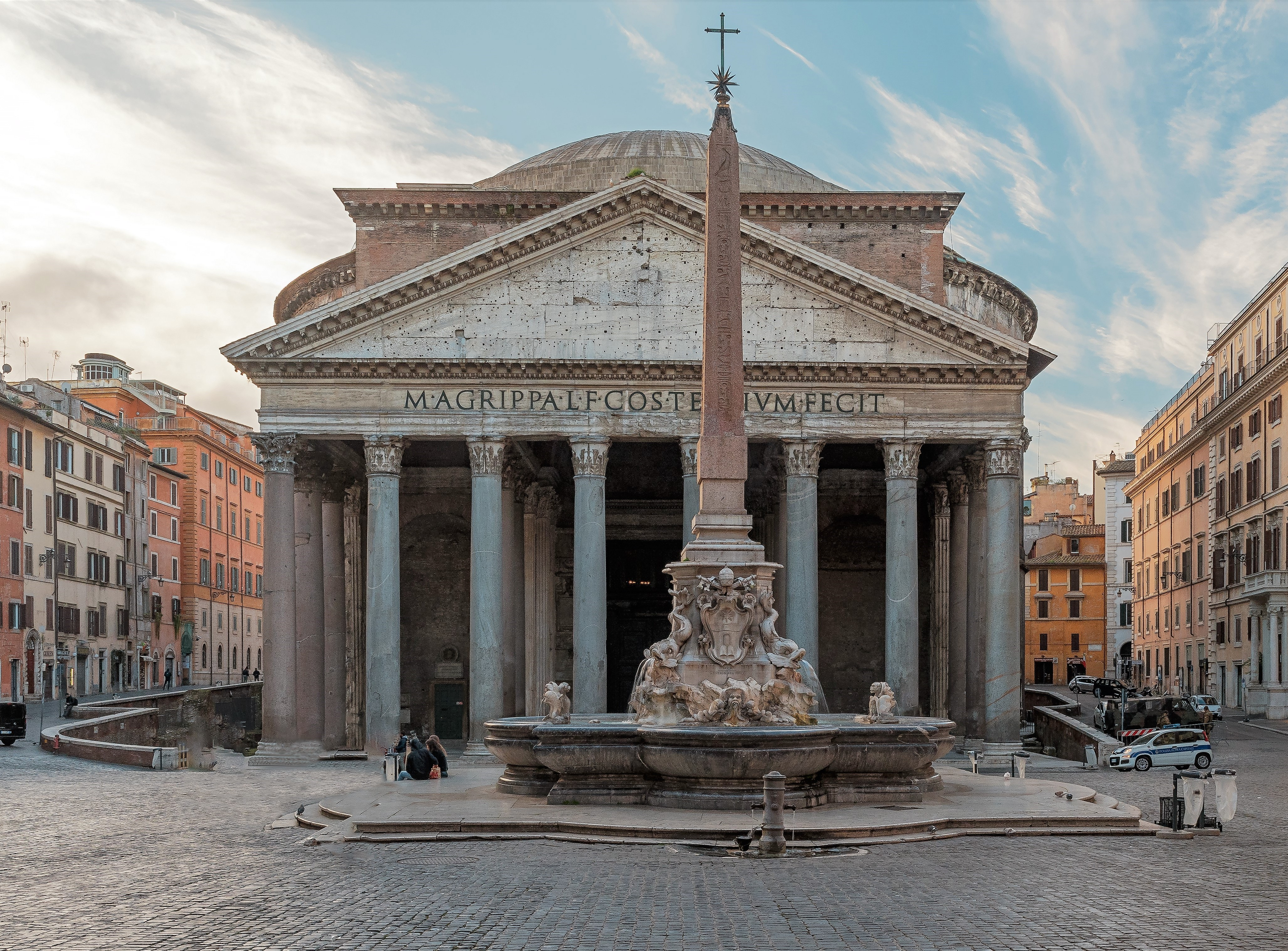
Pantheon, Rome is the perfect symbol of the origin of Western civilization

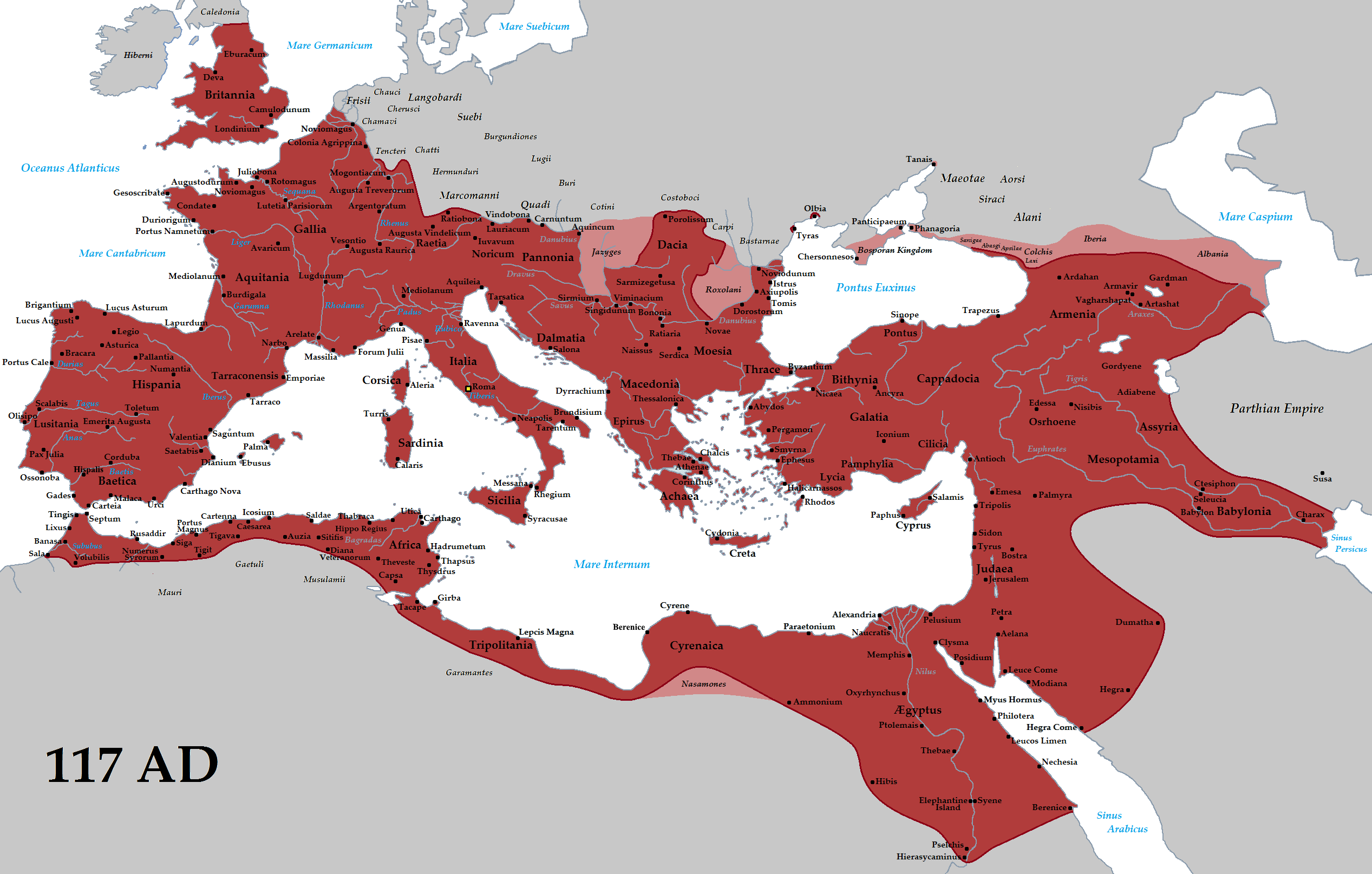
Roman Empire under Trajan in 117 AD

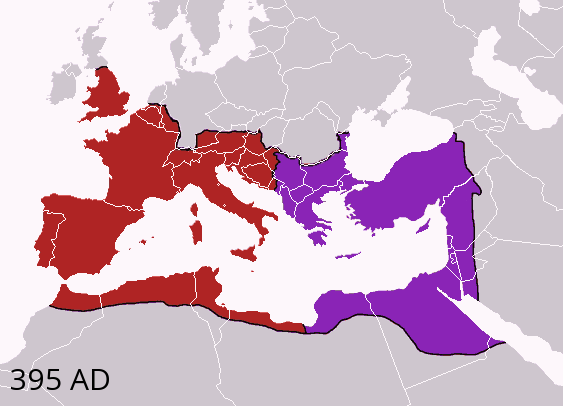
Western Roman Empire and Eastern Roman Empire at the death of Theodosius I in 395 AD

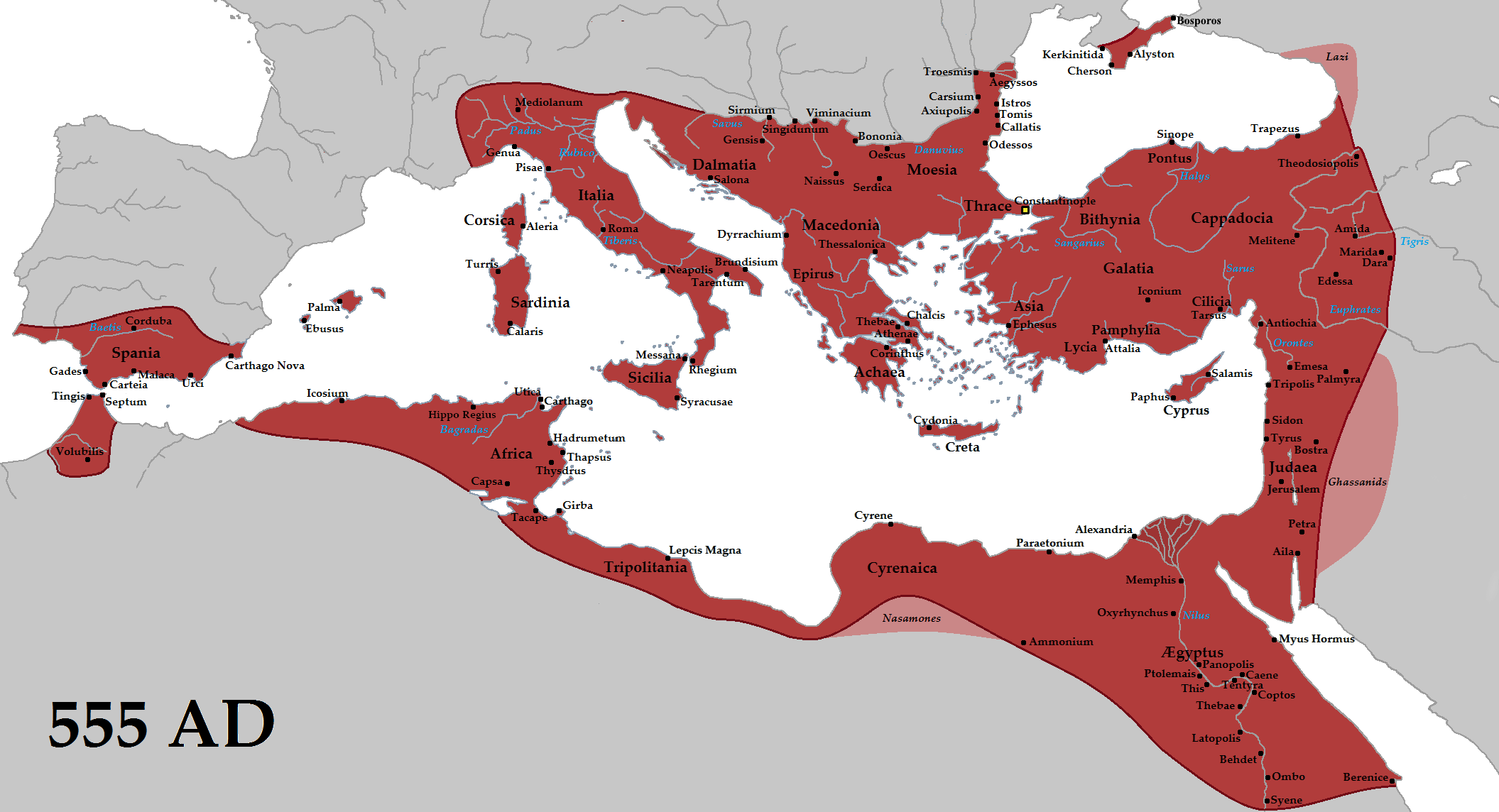
Eastern Roman Empire in 555 AD under Justinian I

To fully understand the origins of the history of Western civilization, we must begin with the word itself: the West. The West was defined or origin with the birth of the Western Roman Empire, a division of the Roman Empire, of which Rome remained the center or hub. Its official language was Latin. Therefore, the West is defined in relation to Rome.

Although some historians trace the birth of the West to the rise of Greek culture, as opposed to the Eastern culture represented by Achaemenid Empire, this interpretation is not entirely accurate when referring to the Greco-Persian Wars.

The Roman Empire was enormously influenced by Greek culture even before definitively conquering its territories, which it knew in its Hellenistic connotation, since contact with Greek culture occurred with the Roman conquest of Magna Graecia. Greek culture was already part of the culture of ancient Rome at the time of its division into the Western Roman Empire and the Eastern Roman Empire. But the Christian religion was also widespread throughout the Roman Empire before its division. A primarily administrative and political division, but later became de facto following the fall of the Western Roman Empire.

After the massacres, devastation, and looting of the barbarian invasions, the Christian Church of Rome became the custodian of the ancient imperial power and ancient knowledge of Roman Empire. A custodian that, over the centuries, became the key to the power of Western civilization, which, in addition to increasingly distancing itself from the political power of the Eastern Roman Empire, called then Byzantine Empire, also increasingly distanced itself religiously with the Acacian schism in 484, the Photian schism in 863, and finally with the definitive, or so-called Great Schism, of 1054. These main historical connotations constitute the origin of Western civilization.

== The Middle Ages ==
=== Early Middle Ages: 500–1000 ===
While the Roman Empire and Christian religion survived in an increasingly Hellenised form in the Byzantine Empire centered at Constantinople in the East, Western civilization suffered a collapse of literacy and organization following the fall of Rome in AD 476. Gradually however, the Christian religion re-asserted its influence over Western Europe.

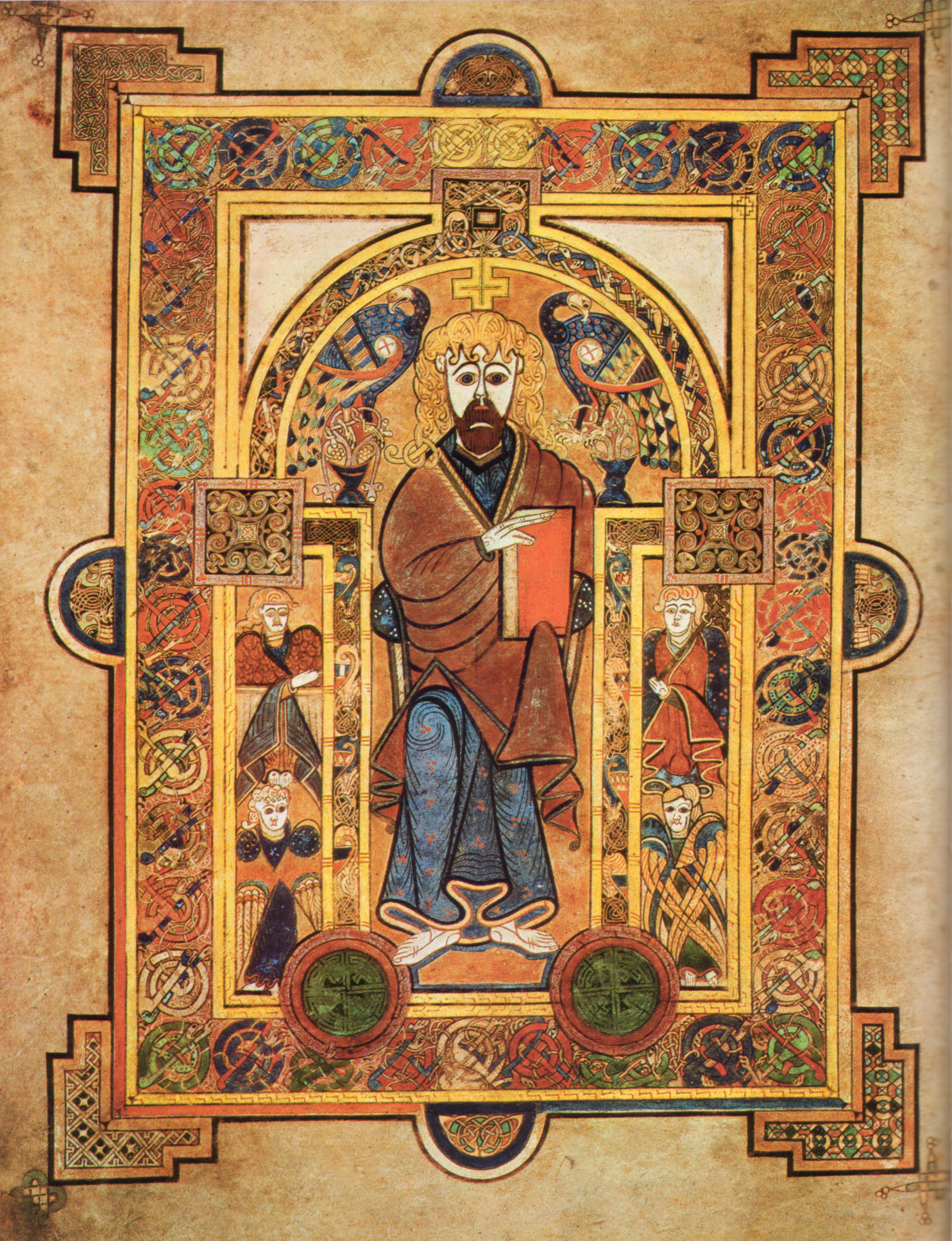
The Book of Kells.

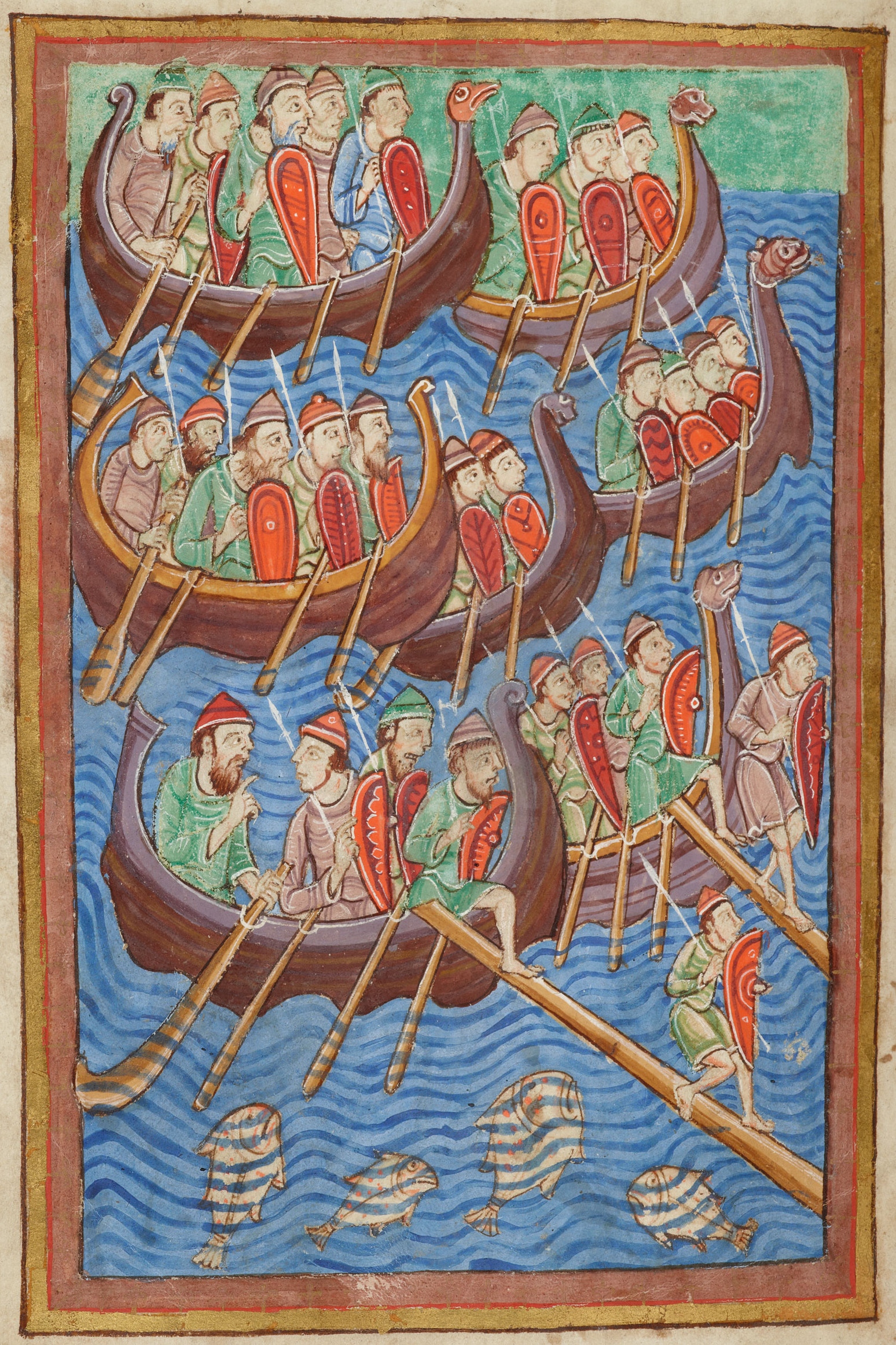
Danish seamen, painted mid-12th century. The Viking Age saw Norsemen explore, raid, conquer and trade through wide areas of the West.

After the Fall of Rome, the papacy served as a source of authority and continuity. In the absence of a magister militum living in Rome, even the control of military matters fell to the pope. Gregory the Great (c 540–604) administered the church with strict reform. A trained Roman lawyer and administrator, and a monk, he represents the shift from the classical to the medieval outlook and was a father of many of the structures of the later Roman Catholic Church. According to the Catholic Encyclopedia, he looked upon Church and State as co-operating to form a united whole, which acted in two distinct spheres, ecclesiastical and secular, but by the time of his death, the papacy was the great power in Italy:

Pope Gregory the Great made himself in Italy a power stronger than emperor or exarch, and established a political influence which dominated the peninsula for centuries. From this time forth the varied populations of Italy looked to the pope for guidance, and Rome as the papal capital continued to be the center of the Christian world.

According to tradition, it was a Romanized Briton, Saint Patrick who introduced Christianity to Ireland around the 5th century. Roman legions had never conquered Ireland, and as the Western Roman Empire collapsed, Christianity managed to survive there. Monks sought out refuge at the far fringes of the known world: like Cornwall, Ireland, or the Hebrides. Disciplined scholarship carried on in isolated outposts like Skellig Michael in Ireland, where literate monks became some of the last preservers in Western Europe of the poetic and philosophical works of Western antiquity.

By around 800 they were producing illuminated manuscripts such as the Book of Kells. The missions of Gaelic monasteries led by monks like St Columba spread Christianity back into Western Europe during the Middle Ages, establishing monasteries initially in northern Britain, then through Anglo-Saxon England and the Frankish Empire during the Middle Ages. Thomas Cahill, in his 1995 book How the Irish Saved Civilization, credited Irish Monks with having "saved" Western Civilization during this period. According to art historian Kenneth Clark, for some five centuries after the fall of Rome, virtually all men of intellect joined the Church and practically nobody in western Europe outside of monastic settlements had the ability to read or write.

Around AD 500, Clovis I, the King of the Franks, became a Christian and united Gaul under his rule. Later in the 6th century, the Byzantine Empire restored its rule in much of Italy and Spain. Missionaries sent from Ireland by the Pope helped to convert England to Christianity in the 6th century as well, restoring that faith as the dominant in Western Europe.

Muhammed, the founder and Prophet of Islam was born in Mecca in AD 570. Working as a trader he encountered the ideas of Christianity and Judaism on the fringes of the Byzantine Empire, and around 610 began preaching of a new monotheistic religion, Islam, and in 622 became the civil and spiritual leader of Medina, soon after conquering Mecca in 630. Dying in 632, Muhammed's new creed conquered first the Arabian tribes, then the great Byzantine cities of Damascus in 635 and Jerusalem in 636. A multiethnic Islamic empire was established across the formerly Roman Middle East and North Africa. By the early 8th century, Iberia and Sicily had fallen to the Muslims. By the 9th century, Malta, Cyprus, and Crete had fallen – and for a time the region of Septimania.

Only in 732 was the Muslim advance into Europe stopped by the Frankish leader Charles Martel, saving Gaul and the rest of the West from conquest by Islam. From this time, the "West" became synonymous with Christendom, the territory ruled by Christian powers, as Oriental Christianity fell to dhimmi status under the Muslim Caliphates. The cause to liberate the "Holy Land" remained a major focus throughout medieval history, fueling many consecutive crusades, only the first of which was successful (although it resulted in many atrocities, in Europe as well as elsewhere).

Charlemagne ("Charles the Great" in English) became king of the Franks. He conquered Gaul (modern day France), northern Spain, Saxony, and northern and central Italy. In 800, Pope Leo III crowned Charlemagne Holy Roman Emperor. Under his rule, his subjects in non-Christian lands like Germany converted to Christianity.

A map showing Charlemagne's additions (in light green) to the Germanic Frankish Kingdom

After his reign, the empire he created broke apart into the kingdom of France (from Francia meaning "land of the Franks"), Holy Roman Empire and the kingdom in between (containing modern day Switzerland, northern-Italy, Eastern France and the low-countries).

Starting in the late 8th century, the Vikings began seaborne attacks on the towns and villages of Europe. Eventually, they turned from raiding to conquest, and conquered Ireland, most of England, and northern France (Normandy). These conquests were not long-lasting, however. In 954 Alfred the Great drove the Vikings out of England, which he united under his rule, and Viking rule in Ireland ended as well. In Normandy the Vikings adopted French culture and language, became Christians and were absorbed into the native population.

By the beginning of the 11th century Scandinavia was divided into three kingdoms, Norway, Sweden, and Denmark, all of which were Christian and part of Western civilization. Norse explorers reached Iceland, Greenland, and even North America, however only Iceland was permanently settled by the Norse. A period of warm temperatures from around 1000–1200 enabled the establishment of a Norse outpost in Greenland in 985, which survived for some 400 years as the most westerly outpost of Christendom. From here, Norseman attempted their short-lived European colony in North America, five centuries before Columbus.

In the 10th century another marauding group of warriors swept through Europe, the Magyars. They eventually settled in what is today Hungary, converted to Christianity and became the ancestors of the Hungarian people.

A West Slavic people, the Poles, formed a unified state by the 10th century and having adopted Christianity also in the 10th century but with pagan rising in the 11th century.

By the start of the second millennium AD, the West had become divided linguistically into three major groups. The Romance languages, based on Latin, the language of the Romans, the Germanic languages, and the Celtic languages. The most widely spoken Romance languages were French, Italian, Portuguese and Spanish. Four widely spoken Germanic languages were English, German, Dutch, and Danish. Irish and Scots Gaelic were two widely spoken Celtic languages in the British Isles.

=== High Middle Ages: 1000–1300 ===
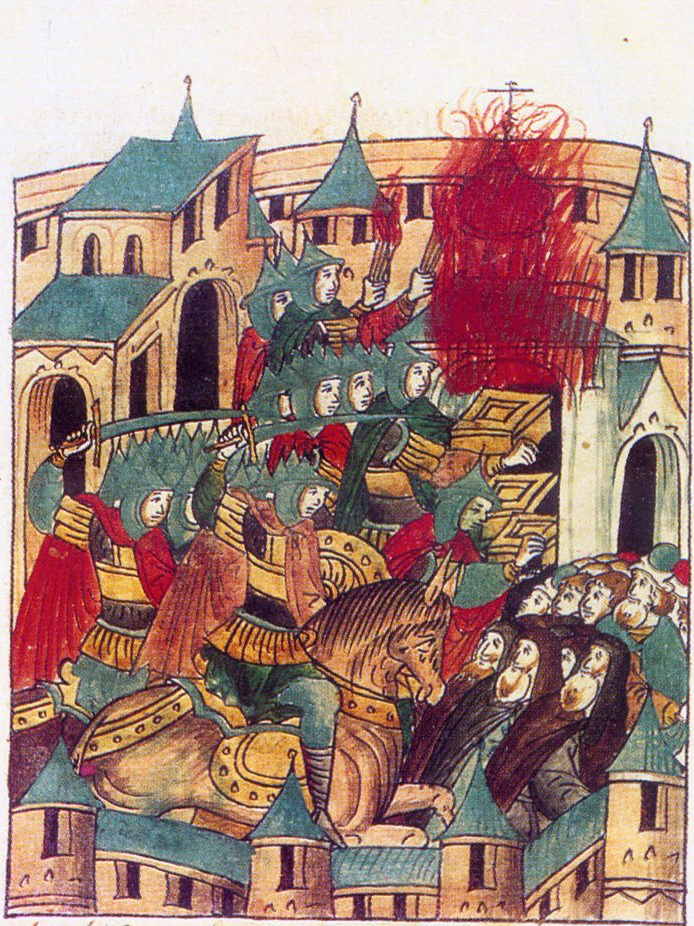
The Mongol invasion of Rus': Sacking of Suzdal by Batu Khan (1238). From the medieval Russian annals.

Art historian Kenneth Clark wrote that Western Europe's first "great age of civilisation" was ready to begin around the year 1000. From 1100, he wrote: "every branch of life – action, philosophy, organisation, technology [experienced an] extraordinary outpouring of energy, an intensification of existence". Upon this period rests the foundations of many of Europe's subsequent achievements. By Clark's account, the Catholic Church was very powerful, essentially internationalist and democratic in its structures and run by monastic organisations generally following the Rule of Saint Benedict. Men of intelligence usually joined religious orders and those of intellectual, administrative or diplomatic skill could advance beyond the usual restraints of society – leading churchmen from faraway lands were accepted in local bishoprics, linking European thought across wide distances. Complexes like the Abbey of Cluny became vibrant centres with dependencies spread throughout Europe. Ordinary people also trekked vast distances on pilgrimages to express their piety and pray at the site of holy relics.

Monumental abbeys and cathedrals were constructed and decorated with sculptures, hangings, mosaics and works belonging to one of the greatest epochs of art and providing stark contrast to the monotonous and cramped conditions of ordinary living. Abbot Suger of the Abbey of St. Denis is considered an influential early patron of Gothic architecture and believed that love of beauty brought people closer to God: "The dull mind rises to truth through that which is material". Clark calls this "the intellectual background of all the sublime works of art of the next century and in fact has remained the basis of our belief of the value of art until today".

By the year 1000 feudalism had become the dominant social, economic and political system. At the top of society was the monarch, who gave land to nobles in exchange for loyalty. The nobles gave land to vassals, who served as knights to defend their monarch or noble. Under the vassals were the peasants or serfs. The feudal system thrived as long as peasants needed protection by the nobility from invasions originating inside and outside of Europe. So as the 11th century progressed, the feudal system declined along with the threat of invasion.

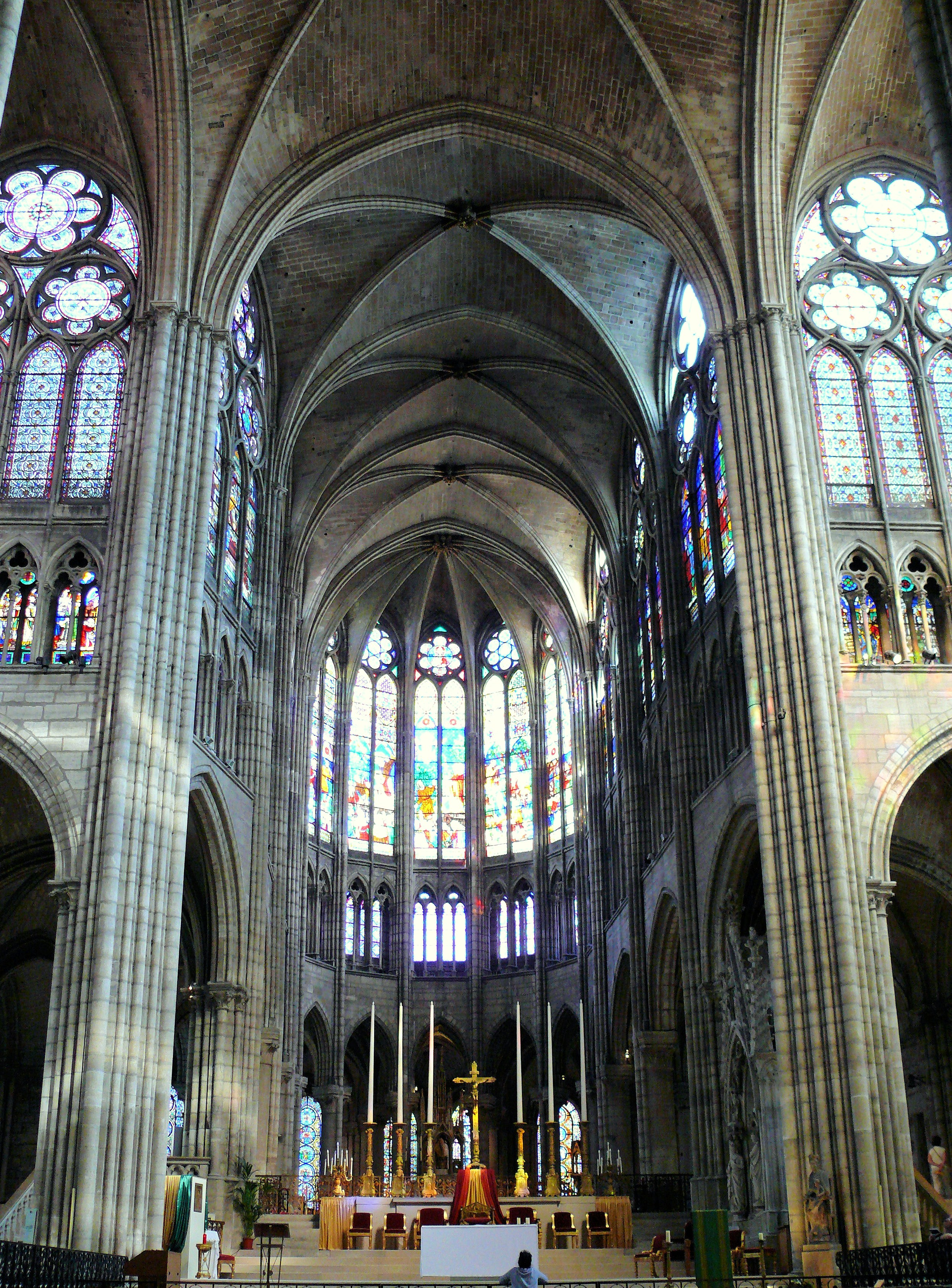
The Abbey of St. Denis, France. Abbot Suger of this Abbey was an early patron of the extraordinary artistic achievements of the epoch.

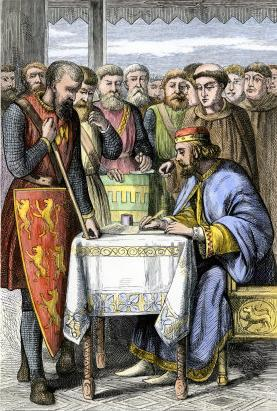
Barons forced King John of England to sign the Magna Carta laying early foundations for the evolution of constitutional monarchy.

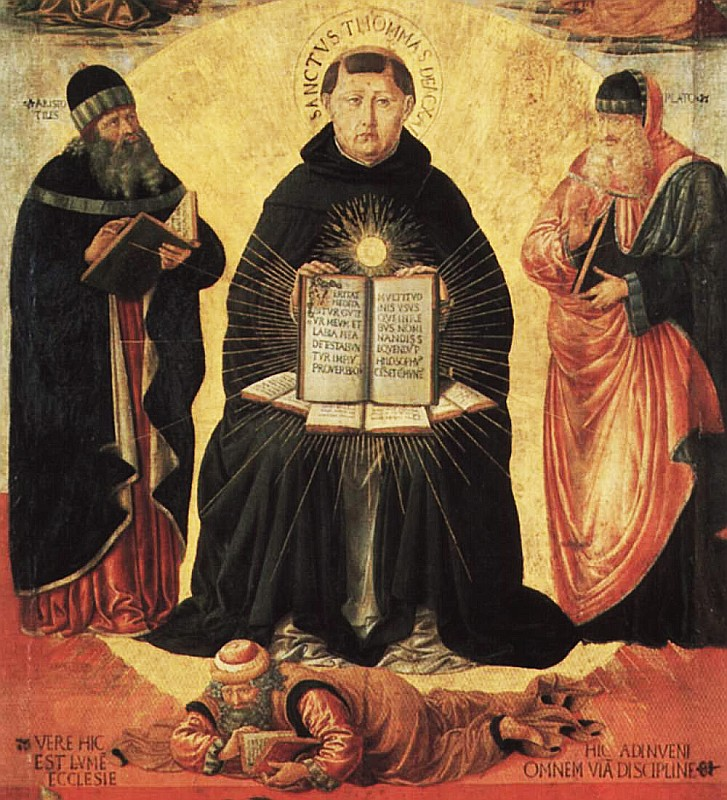
Saint Thomas Aquinas was one of the most influential scholars of the Medieval period.

In 1054, after centuries of strained relations, the Great Schism occurred over differences in doctrine, splitting the Christian world between the Catholic Church, centered in Rome and dominant in the West, and the Orthodox Church, centered in Constantinople, capital of the Byzantine Empire. The last pagan land in Europe was converted to Christianity with the conversion of the Baltic peoples in the High Middle Ages, bringing them into Western civilization as well.

As the medieval period progressed, the aristocratic military ideal of Chivalry and institution of knighthood based around courtesy and service to others became culturally important. Large Gothic cathedrals of extraordinary artistic and architectural intricacy were constructed throughout Europe, including Canterbury Cathedral in England, Cologne Cathedral in Germany and Chartres Cathedral in France (called the "epitome of the first great awakening in European civilisation" by Kenneth Clark). The period produced ever more extravagant art and architecture, but also the virtuous simplicity of such as St Francis of Assisi (expressed in the Prayer of St Francis) and the epic poetry of Dante Alighieri's Divine Comedy. As the Church grew more powerful and wealthy, many sought reform. The Dominican and Franciscan Orders were founded, which emphasized poverty and spirituality.

Women were in many respects excluded from political and mercantile life, however, leading churchwomen were an exception. Medieval abbesses and female superiors of monastic houses were powerful figures whose influence could rival that of male bishops and abbots: "They treated with kings, bishops, and the greatest lords on terms of perfect equality;. . . they were present at all great religious and national solemnities, at the dedication of churches, and even, like the queens, took part in the deliberation of the national assemblies...". The increasing popularity of devotion to the Virgin Mary (the mother of Jesus) secured maternal virtue as a central cultural theme of Catholic Europe. Kenneth Clark wrote that the 'Cult of the Virgin' in the early 12th century "had taught a race of tough and ruthless barbarians the virtues of tenderness and compassion".

In 1095, Pope Urban II called for a Crusade to re-conquer the Holy Land from Muslim rule, when the Seljuk Turks prevented Christians from visiting the holy sites there. For centuries prior to the emergence of Islam, Asia Minor and much of the Mid East had been a part of the Roman and later Byzantine Empires. The Crusades were originally launched in response to a call from the Byzantine Emperor for help to fight the expansion of the Turks into Anatolia.

The First Crusade succeeded in its task, but at a serious cost on the home front, and the crusaders established rule over the Holy Land. However, Muslim forces reconquered the land by the 13th century, and subsequent crusades were not very successful. The specific crusades to restore Christian control of the Holy Land were fought over a period of nearly 200 years, between 1095 and 1291. Other campaigns in Spain and Portugal (the Reconquista), and Northern Crusades continued into the 15th century.

The Crusades had major far-reaching political, economic, and social impacts on Europe. They further served to alienate Eastern and Western Christendom from each other and ultimately failed to prevent the march of the Turks into Europe through the Balkans and the Caucasus.

After the fall of the Roman Empire, many of the classical Greek texts were translated into Arabic and preserved in the medieval Islamic world, from where the Greek classics along with Arabic science and philosophy were transmitted to Western Europe and translated into Latin during the Renaissance of the 12th century and 13th century.

Cathedral schools began in the Early Middle Ages as centers of advanced education, some of them ultimately evolving into medieval universities. During the High Middle Ages, Chartres Cathedral operated the famous and influential Chartres Cathedral School. The medieval universities of Western Christendom were well-integrated across all of Western Europe, encouraged freedom of enquiry and produced a great variety of fine scholars and natural philosophers, including Robert Grosseteste of the University of Oxford, an early expositor of a systematic method of scientific experimentation; and Saint Albert the Great, a pioneer of biological field research. The Italian University of Bologna is considered the oldest continually operating university.

Philosophy in the High Middle Ages focused on religious topics. Christian Platonism, which modified Plato's idea of the separation between the ideal world of the forms and the imperfect world of their physical manifestations to the Christian division between the imperfect body and the higher soul was at first the dominant school of thought. However, in the 12th century the works of Aristotle were reintroduced to the West, which resulted in a new school of inquiry known as scholasticism, which emphasized scientific observation. Two important philosophers of this period were Saint Anselm and Saint Thomas Aquinas, both of whom were concerned with proving God's existence through philosophical means. The Summa Theologica by Aquinas was one of the most influential documents in medieval philosophy and Thomism continues to be studied today in philosophy classes. Theologian Peter Abelard wrote in 1122 "I must understand in order that I may believe... by doubting we come to questioning, and by questioning we perceive the truth".

In Normandy, the Vikings adopted French culture and language, mixed with the native population of mostly Frankish and Gallo-Roman stock and became known as the Normans. They played a major political, military, and cultural role in medieval Europe and even the Near East. They were famed for their martial spirit and Christian piety. They quickly adopted the Romance language of the land they settled in, their dialect becoming known as Norman, an important literary language. The Duchy of Normandy, which they formed by treaty with the French crown, was one of the great large fiefs of medieval France. The Normans are famed both for their culture, such as their unique Romanesque architecture, and their musical traditions, as well as for their military accomplishments and innovations. Norman adventurers established a kingdom in Sicily and southern Italy by conquest, and a Norman expedition on behalf of their duke led to the Norman Conquest of England. Norman influence spread from these new centres to the Crusader States in the Near East, to Scotland and Wales in Great Britain, and to Ireland.

Relations between the major powers in Western society: the nobility, monarchy and clergy, sometimes produced conflict. If a monarch attempted to challenge church power, condemnation from the church could mean a total loss of support among the nobles, peasants, and other monarchs. The Holy Roman Emperor Henry IV, one of the most powerful men of the 11th century, stood three days bare-headed in the snow at Canossa in 1077, in order to reverse his excommunication by Pope Gregory VII. As monarchies centralized their power as the Middle Ages progressed, nobles tried to maintain their own authority. The sophisticated Court of Holy Roman Emperor Frederick II was based in Sicily, where Norman, Byzantine, and Islamic civilization had intermingled. His realm stretched through Southern Italy, through Germany and in 1229, he crowned himself King of Jerusalem. His reign saw tension and rivalry with the Papacy over control of Northern Italy. A patron of education, Frederick founded the University of Naples.

Plantagenet kings first ruled the Kingdom of England in the 12th century. Henry V left his mark with a famous victory against larger numbers at the Battle of Agincourt, while Richard the Lionheart, who had earlier distinguished himself in the Third Crusade, was later romanticised as an iconic figure in English folklore. A distinctive English culture emerged under the Plantagenets, encouraged by some of the monarchs who were patrons of the "father of English poetry", Geoffrey Chaucer. The Gothic architecture style was popular during the time, with buildings such as Westminster Abbey remodelled in that style. King John's sealing of the Magna Carta was influential in the development of common law and constitutional law. The 1215 Charter required the King to proclaim certain liberties, and accept that his will was not arbitrary – for example by explicitly accepting that no "freeman" (non-serf) could be punished except through the law of the land, a right which is still in existence today. Political institutions such as the Parliament of England and the Model Parliament originate from the Plantagenet period, as do educational institutions including the universities of Cambridge and Oxford.

From the 12th century onward inventiveness had re-asserted itself outside of the Viking north and the Islamic south of Europe. Universities flourished, mining of coal commenced, and crucial technological advances such as the lock, which enabled sail ships to reach the thriving Belgian city of Bruges via canals, and the deep sea ship guided by magnetic compass and rudder were invented.

=== Late Middle Ages: 1300–1500 ===
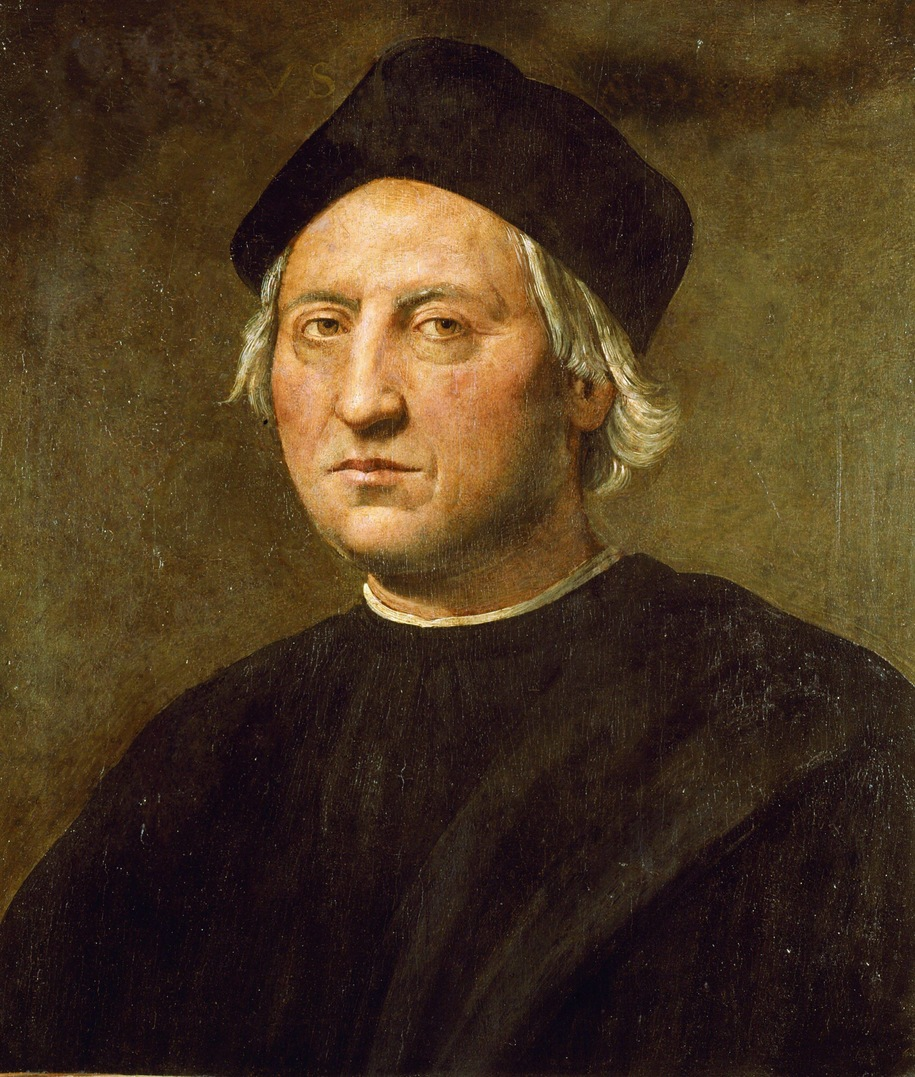
Christopher Columbus

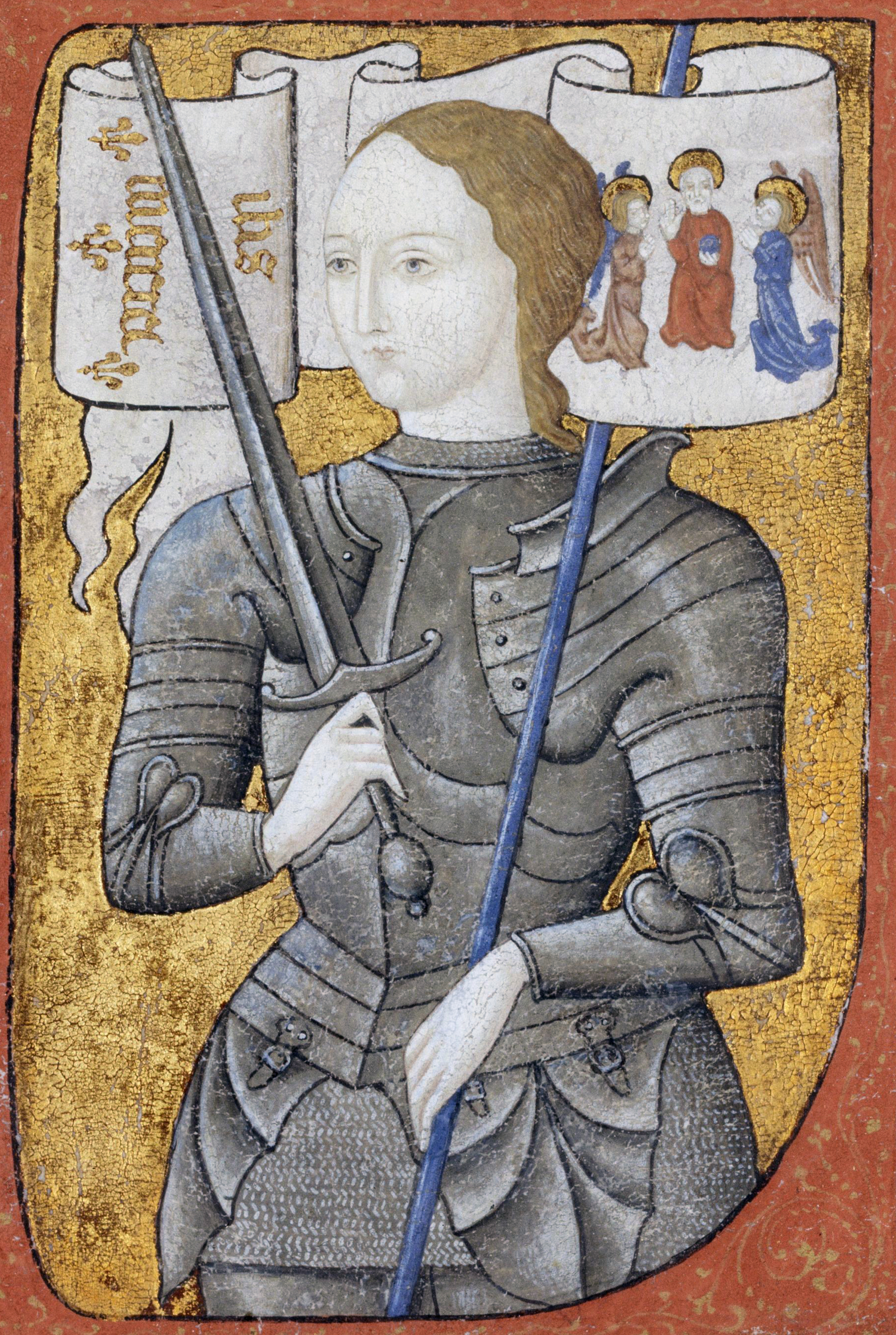
Saint Joan of Arc

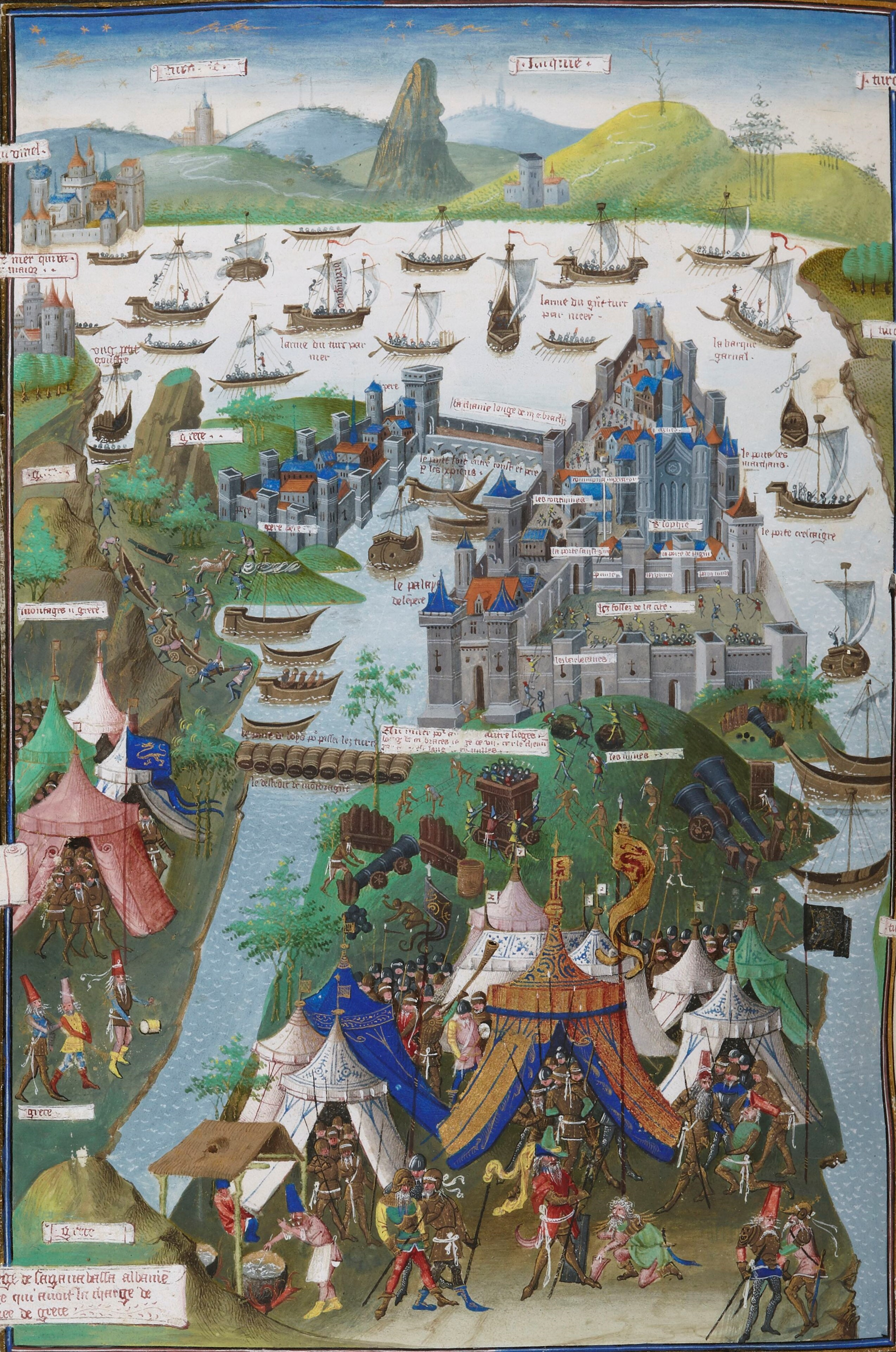
The siege of Constantinople in 1453 (contemporary miniature)

A cooling in temperatures after about 1150 saw leaner harvests across Europe and consequent shortages of food and flax material for clothing. Famines increased and in 1316 serious famine gripped Ypres. In 1410, the last of the Greenland Norseman abandoned their colony to the ice. From Central Asia, Mongol invasions progressed towards Europe throughout the 13th century, resulting in the vast Mongol Empire which became the largest empire of history and ruled over almost half of the human population and expanded through the world by 1300.

The Papacy had its court at Avignon from 1305 to 1378 This arose from the conflict between the Papacy and the French crown. A total of seven popes reigned at Avignon; all were French, and all were increasingly under the influence of the French crown. Finally in 1377 Gregory XI, in part because of the entreaties of the mystic Saint Catherine of Sienna, restored the Holy See to Rome, officially ending the Avignon papacy. However, in 1378 the breakdown in relations between the cardinals and Gregory's successor, Urban VI, gave rise to the Western Schism – which saw another line of Avignon Popes set up as rivals to Rome (subsequent Catholic history does not grant them legitimacy). The period helped weaken the prestige of the Papacy in the buildup to the Protestant Reformation.

In the Later Middle Ages, the Black Plague struck Europe, arriving in 1347. Europe was overwhelmed by the outbreak of bubonic plague, probably brought to Europe by the Mongols. The fleas hosted by rats carried the disease and it devastated Europe. Major cities like Paris, Hamburg, Venice and Florence lost half their population. Around 20 million people – up to a third of Europe's population – died from the plague before it receded. The plague periodically returned over the coming centuries.

The last centuries of the Middle Ages saw the waging of the Hundred Years' War between England and France. The war began in 1337 when the king of France laid claim to English-ruled Gascony in southern France, and the king of England claimed to be the rightful king of France. At first, the English conquered half of France and seemed likely to win the war, until the French were rallied by a peasant girl, who would later become a saint, Joan of Arc. Although she was captured and executed by the English, the French fought on and won the war in 1453. After the war, France gained all of Normandy, excluding the city of Calais, which it gained in 1558.

Following the Mongols from Central Asia came the Ottoman Turks. By 1400 they had captured most of modern-day Turkey and extended their rule into Europe through the Balkans and as far as the Danube, surrounding even the fabled city of Constantinople. Finally, in 1453, one of Europe's greatest cities fell to the Turks. The Ottomans under the command of Sultan Mehmed II, fought a vastly outnumbered defending army commanded by Emperor Constantine XI – the last "Emperor of the Eastern Roman Empire" – and blasted down the ancient walls with the terrifying new weaponry of the cannon. The Ottoman conquests sent refugee Greek scholars westward, contributing to the revival of the West's knowledge of the learning of Classical Antiquity.

Probably the first clock in Europe was installed in a Milan church in 1335, hinting at the dawning mechanical age. By the 14th century, the middle class in Europe had grown in influence and number as the feudal system declined. This spurred the growth of towns and cities in the West and improved the economy of Europe. This, in turn helped begin a cultural movement in the West known as the Renaissance, which began in Italy. Italy was dominated by city-states, many of which were nominally part of the Holy Roman Empire, and were ruled by wealthy aristocrats like the Medicis, or in some cases, by the pope.

== Renaissance and Reformation ==
=== The Renaissance: 14th to 17th century (1300-1700 CE) ===
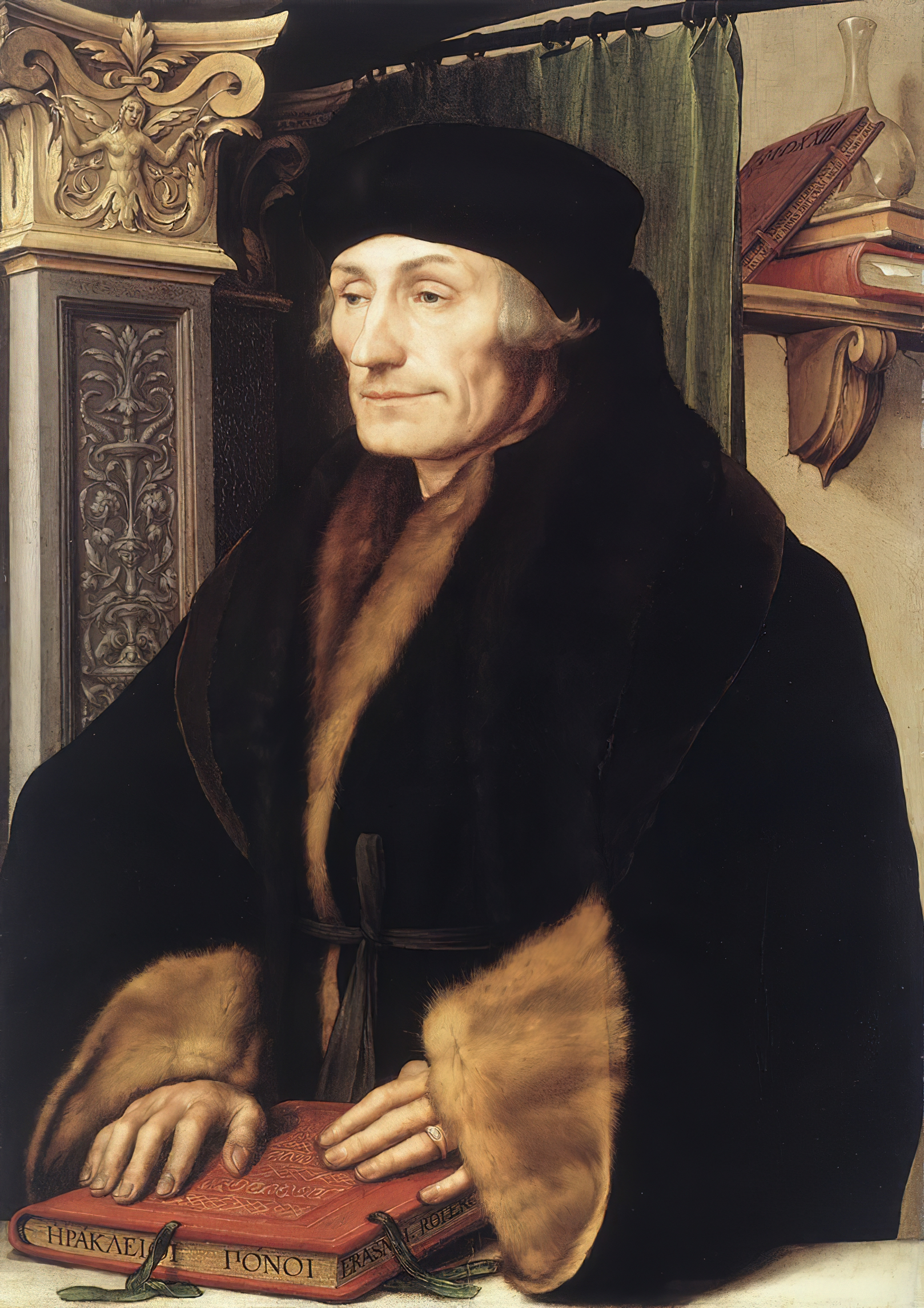
The humanist Desiderius Erasmus who wrote In Praise of Folly, one of the most significant works of Renaissance literature.

The printing press. Gutenberg's invention had a great impact on social and political developments.

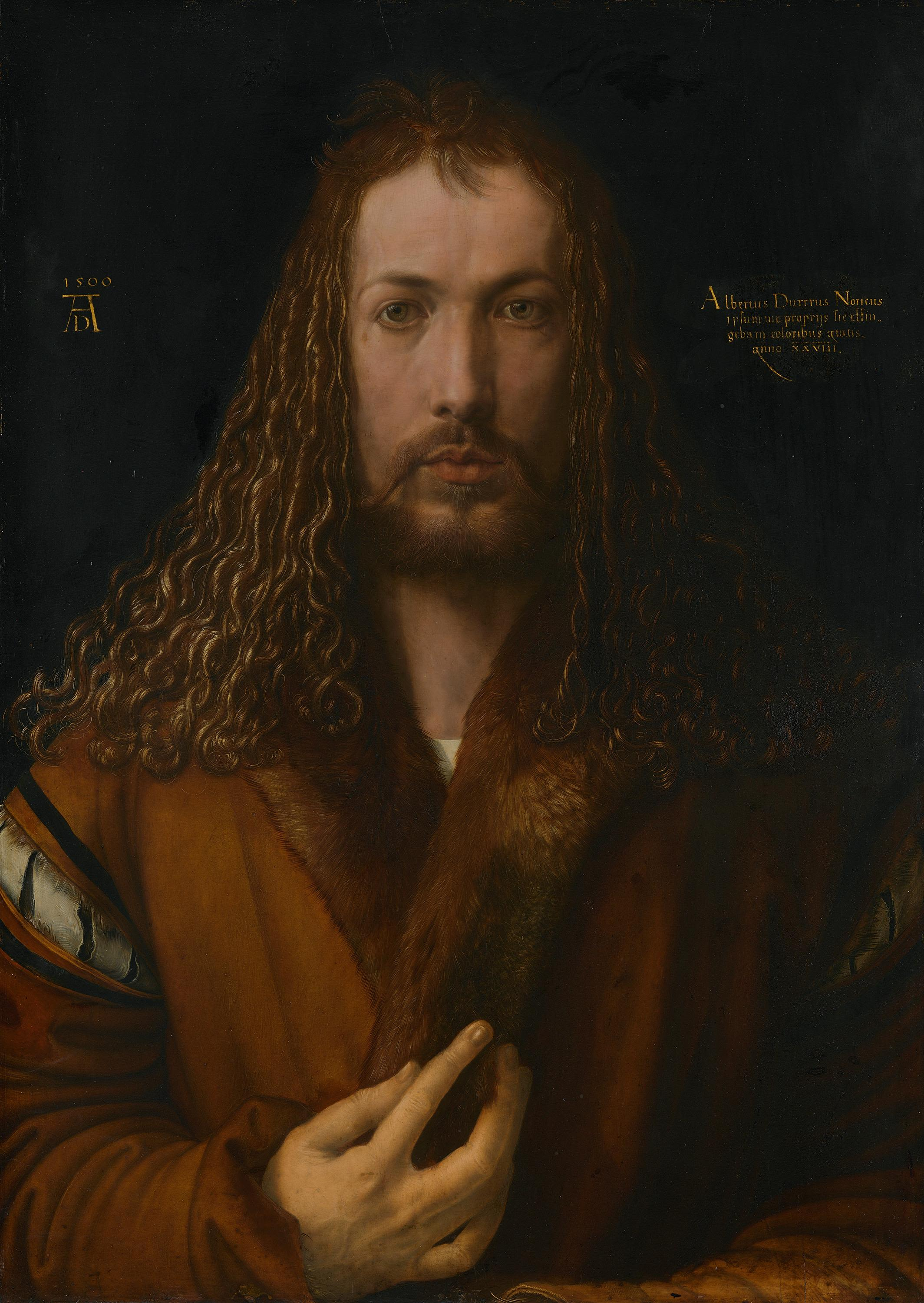
Albrecht Dürer was the main artist of the Northern Renaissance.

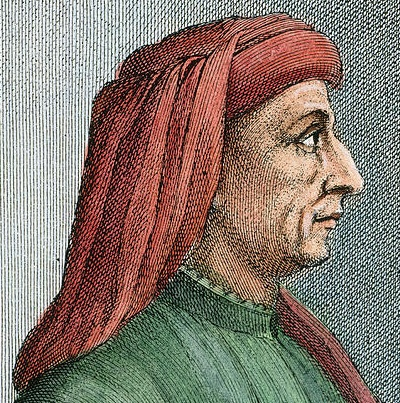
Filippo Brunelleschi, one of the key figures in architecture and the founder of the Renaissance.

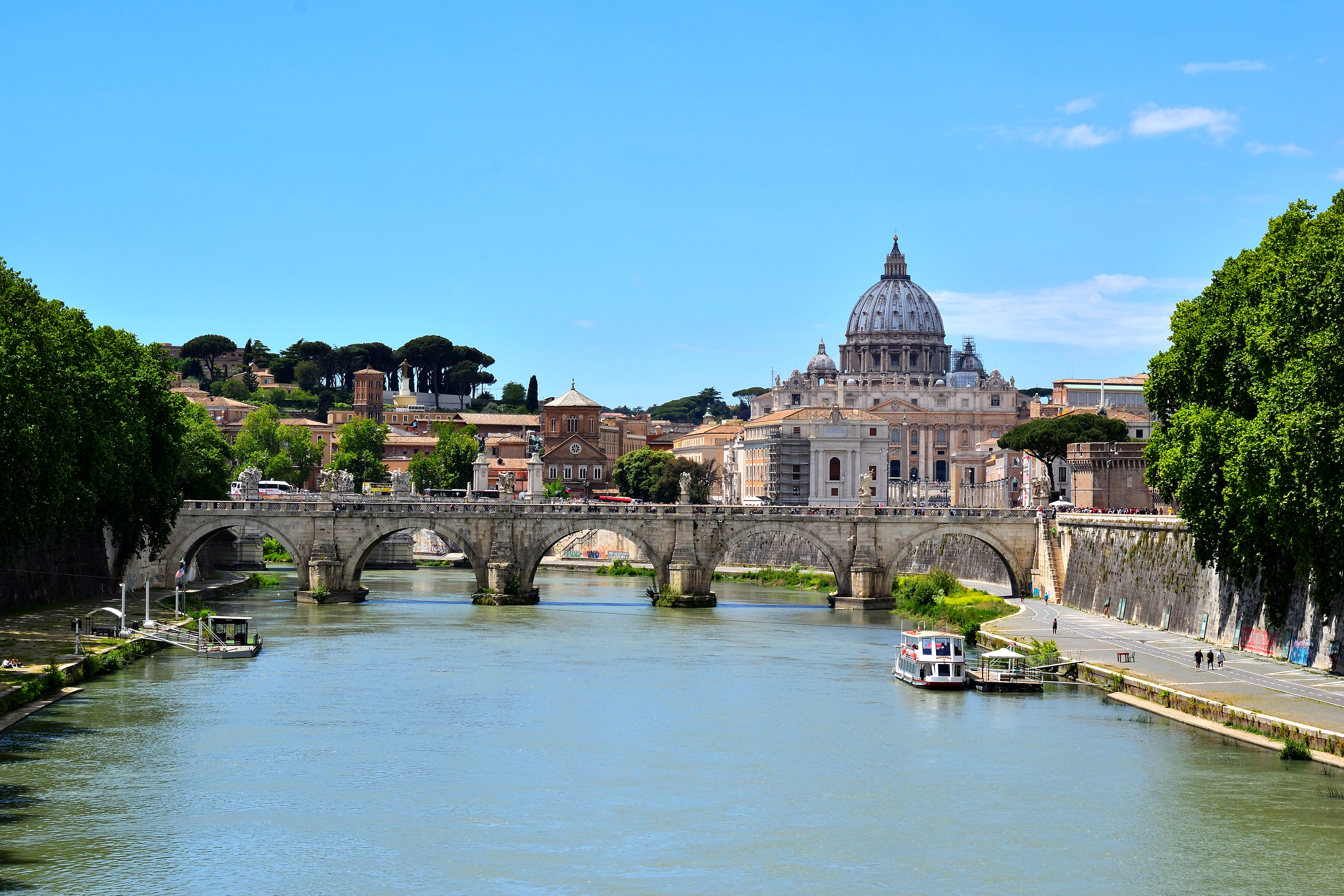
St. Peter's Basilica from the River Tiber in Rome, Italy. The dome, completed in 1590, was designed by Michelangelo, architect, painter and poet.

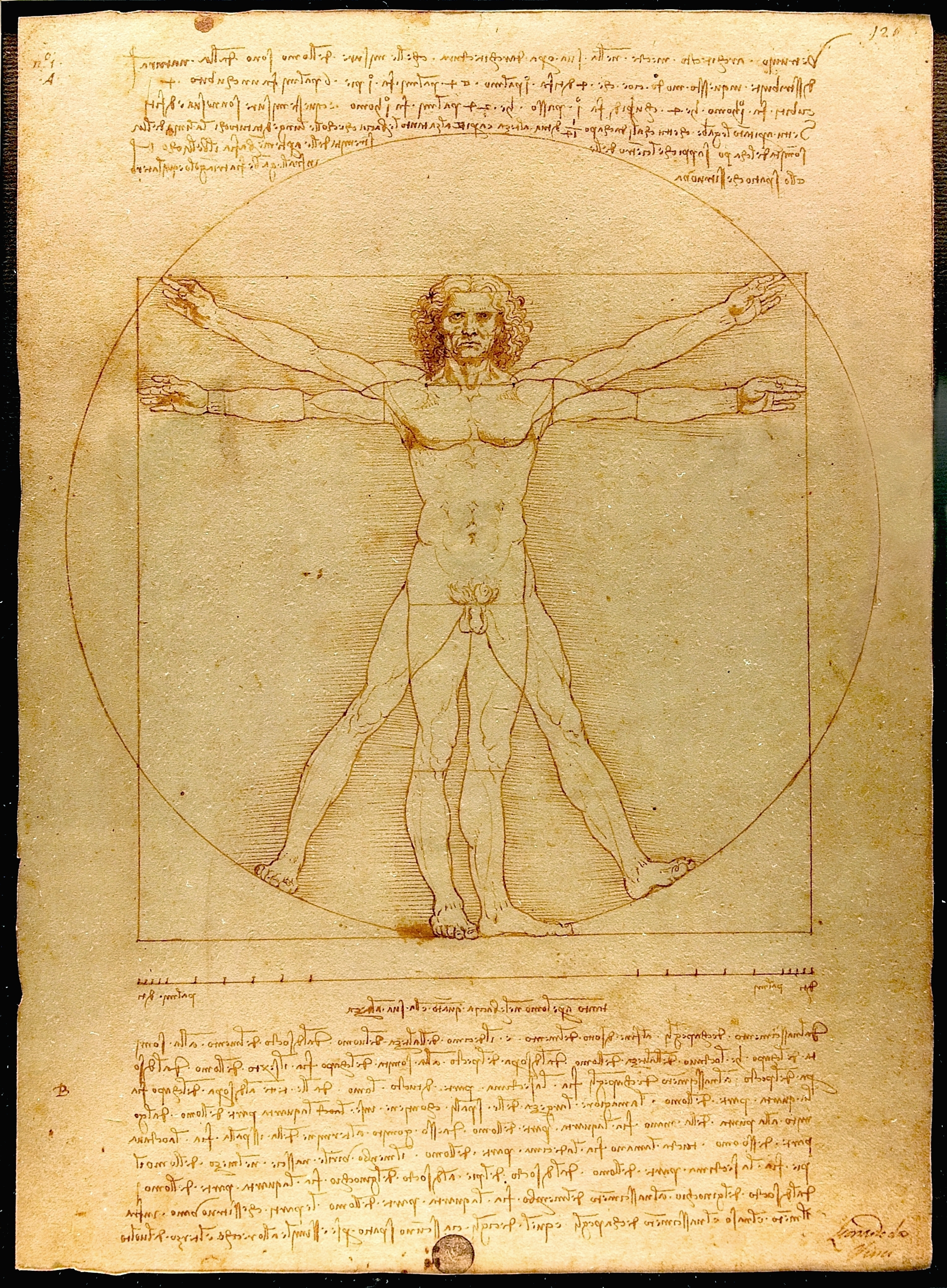
Leonardo da Vinci's Vitruvian Man.

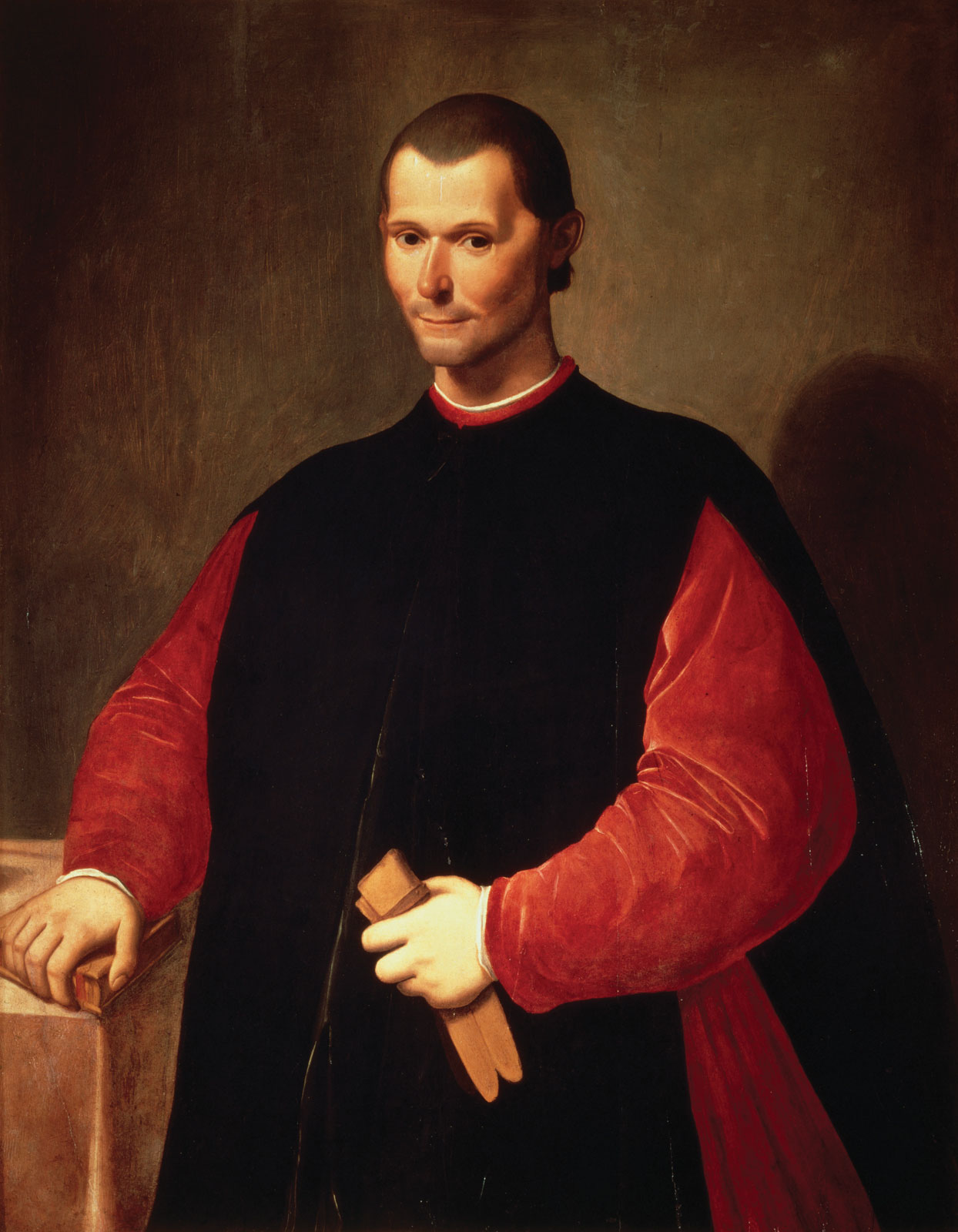
Niccolò Machiavelli, founder of modern political science and ethics

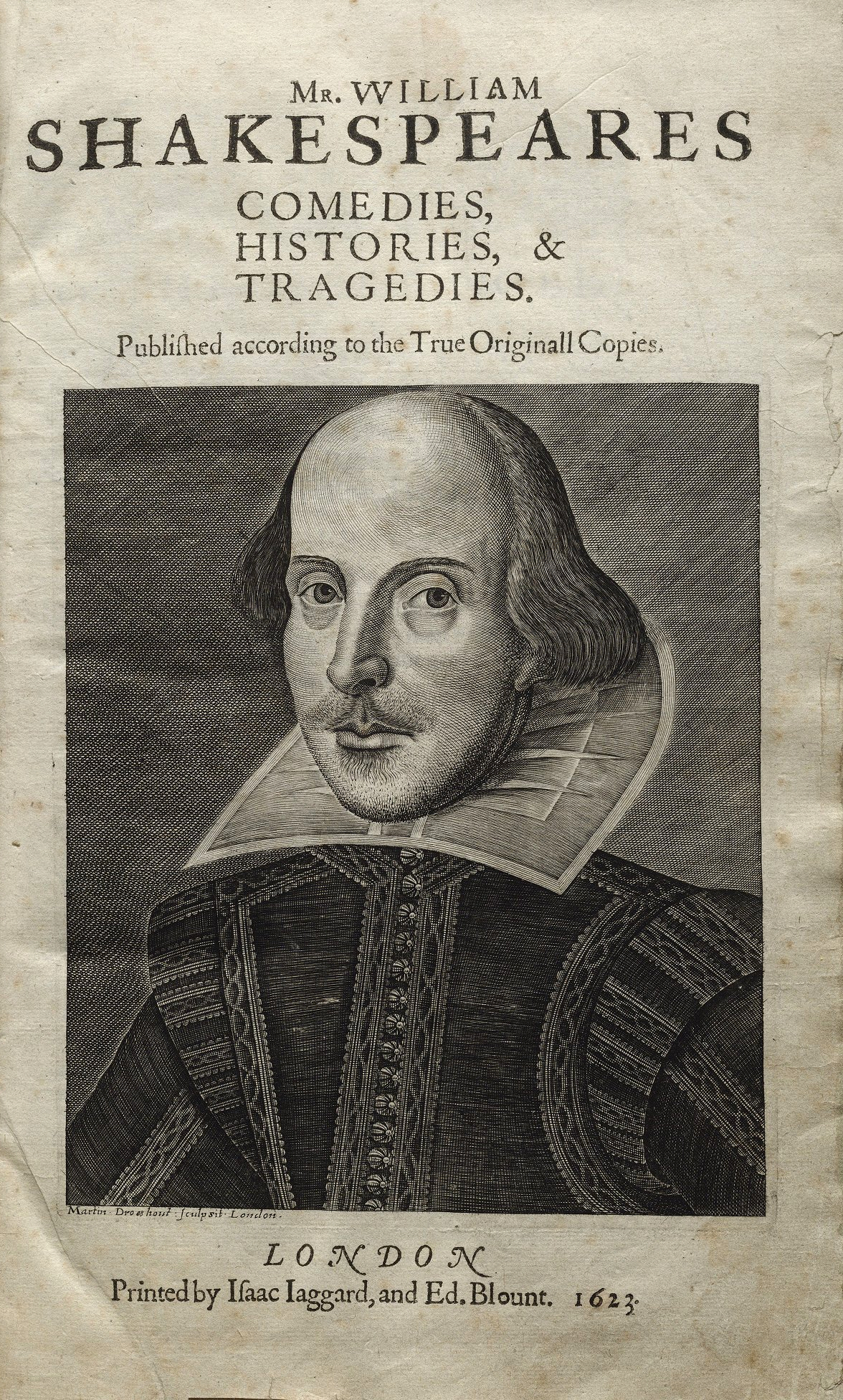
William Shakespeare's First Folio

The Renaissance, originating from Italy, ushered in a new age of scientific and intellectual inquiry and appreciation of ancient Greek and Roman civilizations. The merchant cities of Florence, Genoa, Ghent, Nuremberg, Geneva, Zurich, Lisbon and Seville provided patrons of the arts and sciences and unleashed a flurry of activity.

The Medici became the leading family of Florence and fostered and inspired the birth of the Italian Renaissance along with other families of Italy, such as the Visconti and Sforza of Milan, the Este of Ferrara, and the Gonzaga of Mantua. Greatest artists like Brunelleschi, Botticelli, Da Vinci, Michelangelo, Giotto, Donatello, Titian and Raphael produced inspired works – their paintwork was more realistic-looking than had been created by medieval artists and their marble statues rivalled and sometimes surpassed those of Classical Antiquity. Michelangelo carved his masterpiece David from marble between 1501 and 1504.

Humanist historian Leonardo Bruni, split the history in the antiquity, Middle Ages and modern period.

Churches began being built in the Romanesque style for the first time in centuries. While art and architecture flourished in Italy and then the Netherlands, religious reformers flowered in Germany and Switzerland; printing was establishing itself in the Rhineland and navigators were embarking on extraordinary voyages of discovery from Portugal and Spain.

Around 1450, Johannes Gutenberg developed a printing press, which allowed works of literature to spread more quickly. Secular thinkers like Machiavelli re-examined the history of Rome to draw lessons for civic governance. Theologians revisited the works of St Augustine. Important thinkers of the Renaissance in Northern Europe included the Catholic humanists Desiderius Erasmus, a Dutch theologian, and the English statesman and philosopher Thomas More, who wrote the seminal work Utopia in 1516. Humanism was an important development to emerge from the Renaissance. It placed importance on the study of human nature and worldly topics rather than religious ones. Important humanists of the time included the writers Petrarch and Boccaccio, who wrote in both Latin as had been done in the Middle Ages, as well as the vernacular, in their case Tuscan Italian.

As the calendar reached the year 1500, Europe was blossoming – with Leonardo da Vinci painting his Mona Lisa portrait not long after Christopher Columbus reached the Americas (1492), Amerigo Vespucci proved that America is not a part of India, the Portuguese navigator Vasco Da Gama sailed around Africa into the Indian Ocean and Michelangelo completed his paintings of Old Testament themes on the ceiling of the Sistine Chapel in Rome (the expense of such artistic exuberance did much to spur the likes of Martin Luther in Northern Europe in their protests against the Church of Rome).

For the first time in European history, events North of the Alps and on the Atlantic Coast were taking centre stage. Important artists of this period included Bosch, Dürer, and Breugel. In Spain Miguel de Cervantes wrote the novel Don Quixote, other important works of literature in this period were the Canterbury Tales by Geoffrey Chaucer and Le Morte d'Arthur by Sir Thomas Malory. The most famous playwright of the era was the Englishman William Shakespeare whose sonnets and plays (including Hamlet, Romeo and Juliet and Macbeth) are considered some of the finest works ever written in the English language.

Meanwhile, the Christian kingdoms of northern Iberia continued their centuries-long fight to reconquer the peninsula from its Muslim rulers. In 1492, the last Islamic stronghold, Granada, fell, and Iberia was divided between the Christian kingdoms of Spain and Portugal. Iberia's Jewish and Muslim minorities were forced to convert to Catholicism or be exiled. The Portuguese immediately looked to expand outward sending expeditions to explore the coasts of Africa and engage in trade with the mostly Muslim powers on the Indian Ocean, making Portugal wealthy. In 1492, a Spanish expedition of Christopher Columbus found the Americas during an attempt to find a western route to East Asia.

From the East, however, the Ottoman Turks under Suleiman the Magnificent continued their advance into the heart of Christian Europe – besieging Vienna in 1529.

The 16th century saw the flowering of the Renaissance in the rest of the West. In the Kingdom of Poland, astronomer Nicolaus Copernicus deduced that the geocentric model of the universe was incorrect, and that in fact the planets revolve around the Sun.

=== The Reformation: 1500–1650 ===
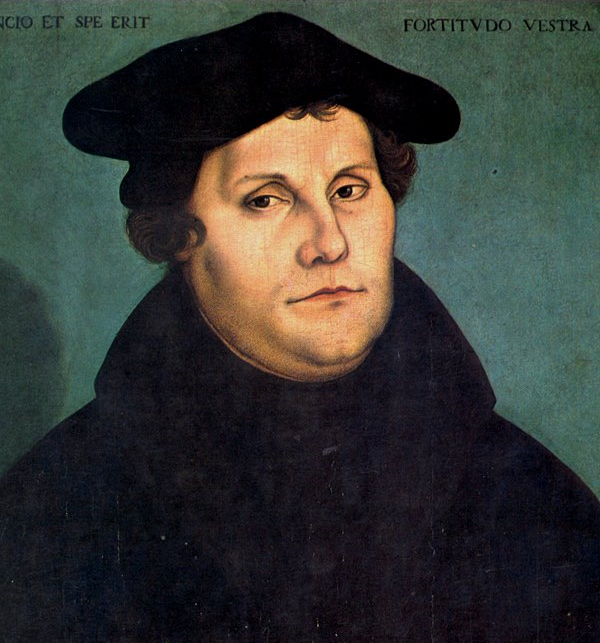
Martin Luther, Protestant Reformer

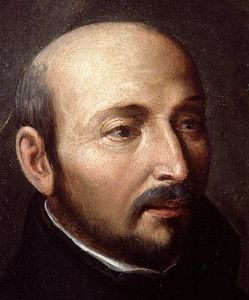
Saint Ignatius Loyola, founder of the Jesuits and a leader of the Counter-Reformation.

The other major movement in the West in the 16th century was the Reformation, which would profoundly change the West and end its religious unity. The Reformation began in 1517 when the Catholic monk Martin Luther wrote his 95 Theses, which denounced the wealth and corruption of the church, as well as many Catholic beliefs, including the institution of the papacy and the belief that, in addition to faith in Christ, "good works" were also necessary for salvation. Luther drew on the beliefs of earlier church critics, like the Bohemian Jan Hus and the Englishman John Wycliffe. Luther's beliefs eventually ended in his excommunication from the Catholic Church and the founding of a church based on his teachings: the Lutheran Church, which became the majority religion in northern Germany. Soon other reformers emerged, and their followers became known as Protestants. In 1525, Ducal Prussia became the first Lutheran state.

In the 1540s the Frenchman John Calvin founded a church in Geneva which forbade alcohol and dancing, and which taught God had selected those destined to be saved from the beginning of time. His Calvinist Church gained about half of Switzerland and churches based on his teachings became dominant in the Netherlands (the Dutch Reformed Church) and Scotland (the Presbyterian Church). In England, when the Pope failed to grant King Henry VIII a divorce, he declared himself head of the Church in England (founding what would evolve into today's Church of England and Anglican Communion). Some Englishmen felt the church was still too similar to the Catholic Church and formed the more radical Puritanism. Many other small Protestant sects were formed, including Zwinglianism, Anabaptism and Mennonism. Although they were different in many ways, Protestants generally called their religious leaders ministers instead of priests, and believed only the Bible, and not Tradition offered divine revelation.

Britain and the Dutch Republic allowed Protestant dissenters to migrate to their North American colonies – thus the future United States found its early Protestant ethos – while Protestants were forbidden to migrate to the Spanish colonies (thus South America retained its Catholic hue). A more democratic organisational structure within some of the new Protestant movements – as in the Calvinists of New England – did much also to foster a democratic spirit in Britain's American colonies.

The Catholic Church responded to the Reformation with the Counter Reformation. Some of Luther and Calvin's criticisms were heeded: the selling of indulgences was reined in by the Council of Trent in 1562. But exuberant baroque architecture and art was embraced as an affirmation of the faith and new seminaries and orders were established to lead missions to far off lands. An important leader in this movement was Saint Ignatius of Loyola, founder of the Society of Jesus (Jesuit Order) which gained many converts and sent such famous missionaries as Saints Matteo Ricci to China, Francis Xavier to India and Peter Claver to the Americas.

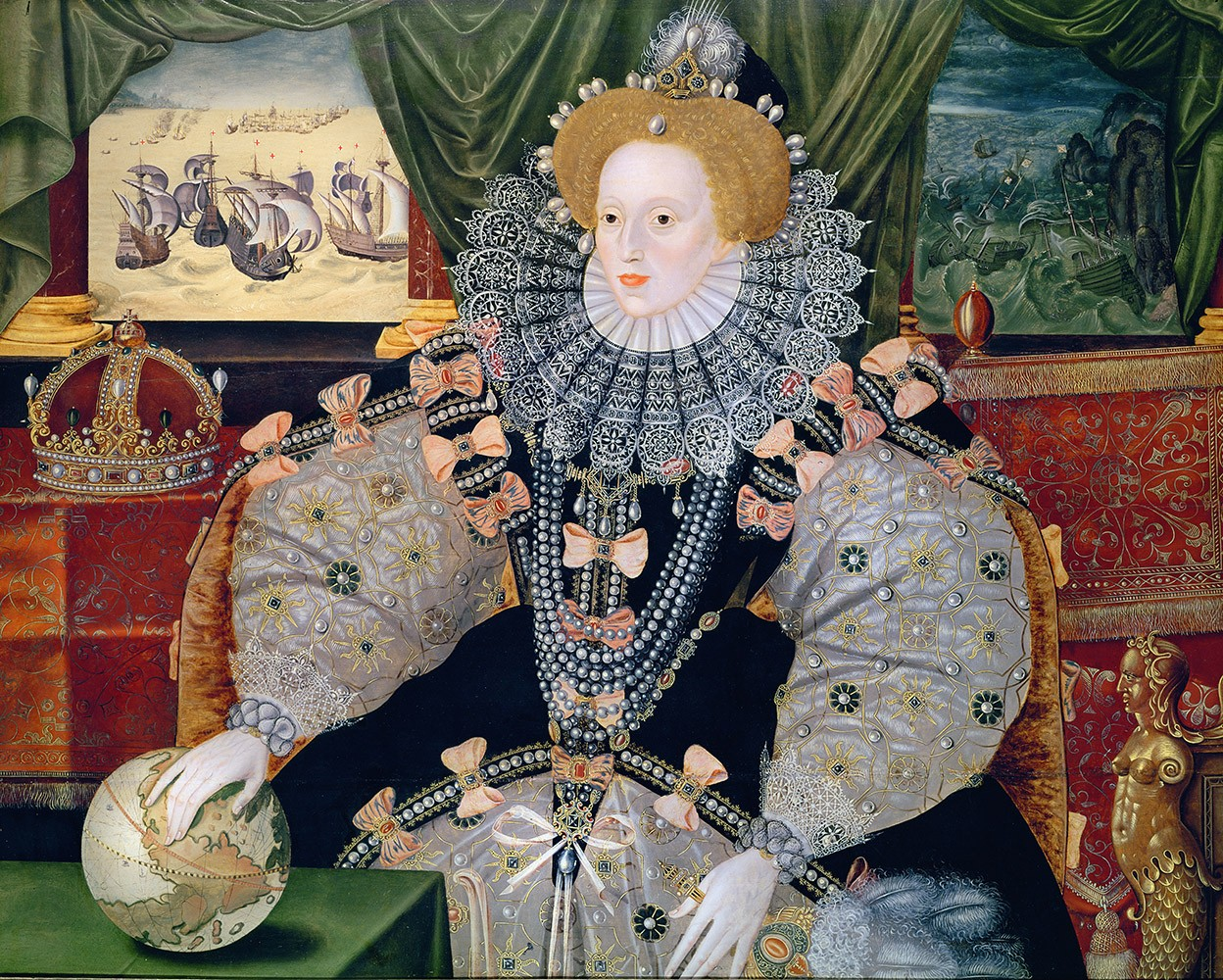
Portrait of Elizabeth I of England.

As princes, kings and emperors chose sides in religious debates and sought national unity, religious wars erupted throughout Europe, especially in the Holy Roman Empire. Emperor Charles V was able to arrange the Peace of Augsburg between the warring Catholic and Protestant nobility. However, in 1618, the Thirty Years' War began between Protestants and Catholics in the empire, which eventually involved neighboring countries like France. The devastating war finally ended in 1648. In the Peace of Westphalia ending the war, Lutheranism, Catholicism and Calvinism were all granted toleration in the empire. The two major centers of power in the empire after the war were Protestant Prussia in the north and Catholic Austria in the south. The Dutch, who were ruled by the Spanish at the time, revolted and gained independence, founding a Protestant country. The Elizabethan era is famous above all for the flourishing of English drama, led by playwrights such as William Shakespeare and for the seafaring prowess of English adventurers such as Sir Francis Drake. Her 44 years on the throne provided welcome stability and helped forge a sense of national identity. One of her first moves as queen was to support the establishment of an English Protestant church, of which she became the Supreme Governor of what was to become the Church of England.

By 1650, the religious map of Europe had been redrawn: Scandinavia, Iceland, north Germany, part of Switzerland, Netherlands and Britain were Protestant, while the rest of the West remained Catholic. A byproduct of the Reformation was increasing literacy as Protestant powers pursued an aim of educating more people to be able to read the Bible.

== Early modern Europe and Rise of Western Empires: 1500–1800 ==
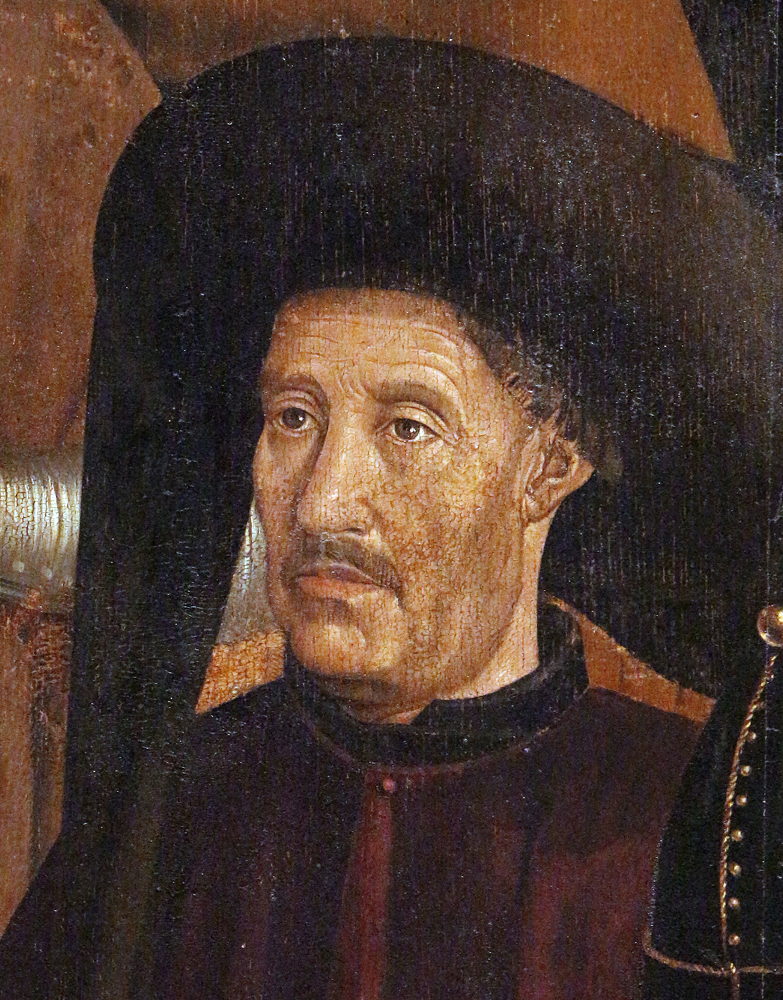
Henry the Navigator was a key personality in European exploration in Africa and Asia.

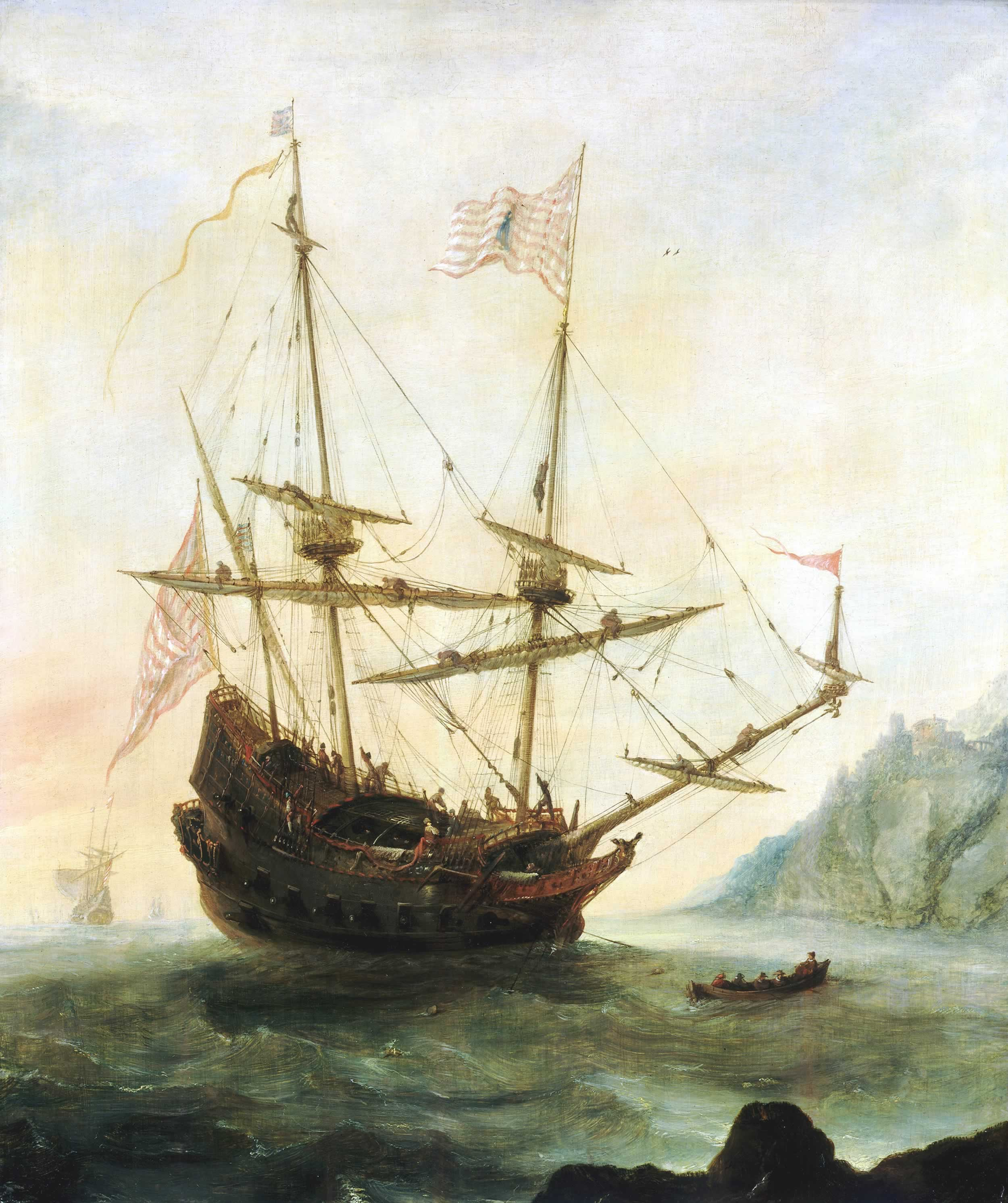
The discovery of the New World by Italian explorer Christopher Columbus

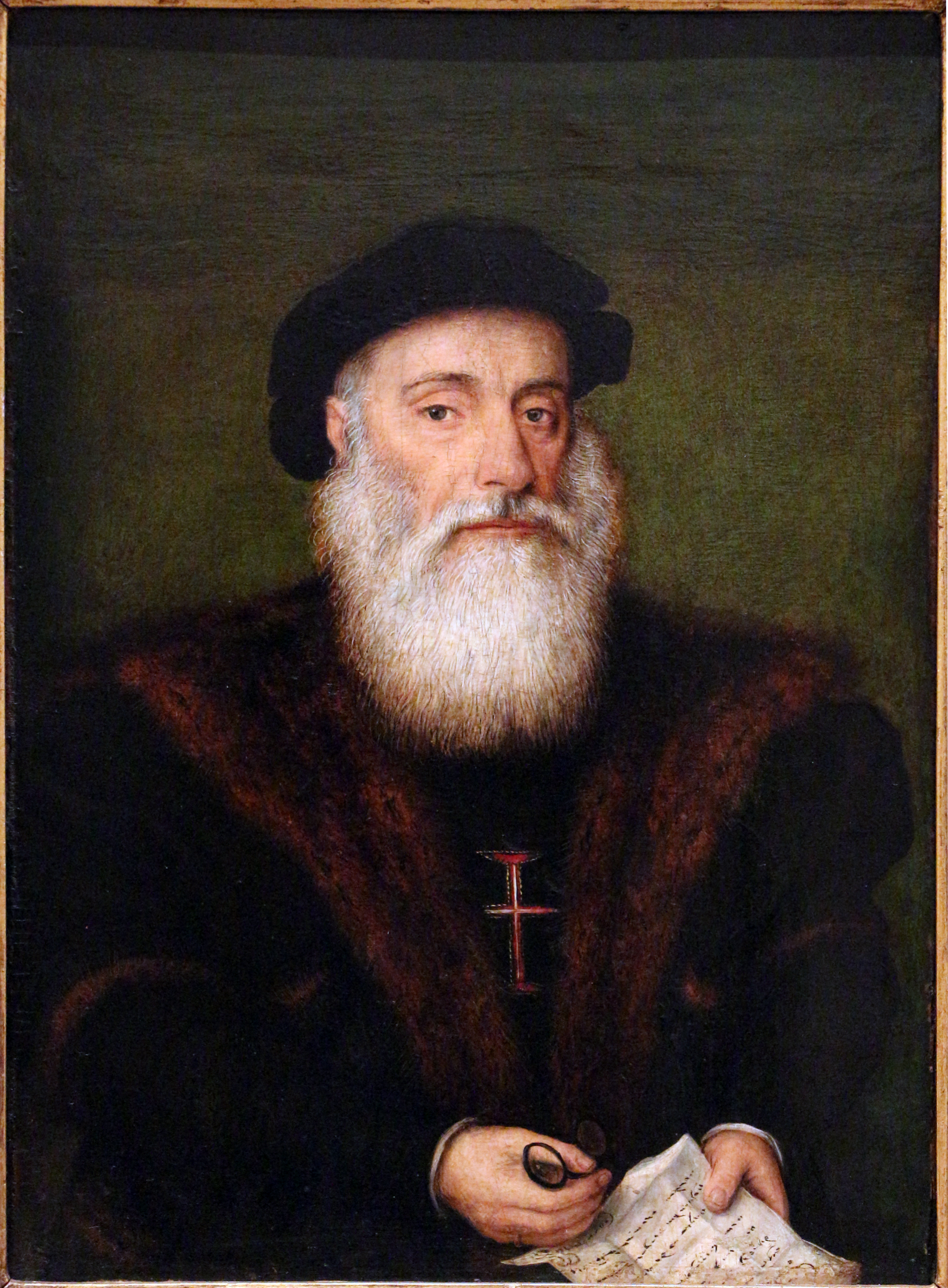
The Portuguese explorer Vasco Da Gama unlocked the sea route from Europe to India (1497–1499).

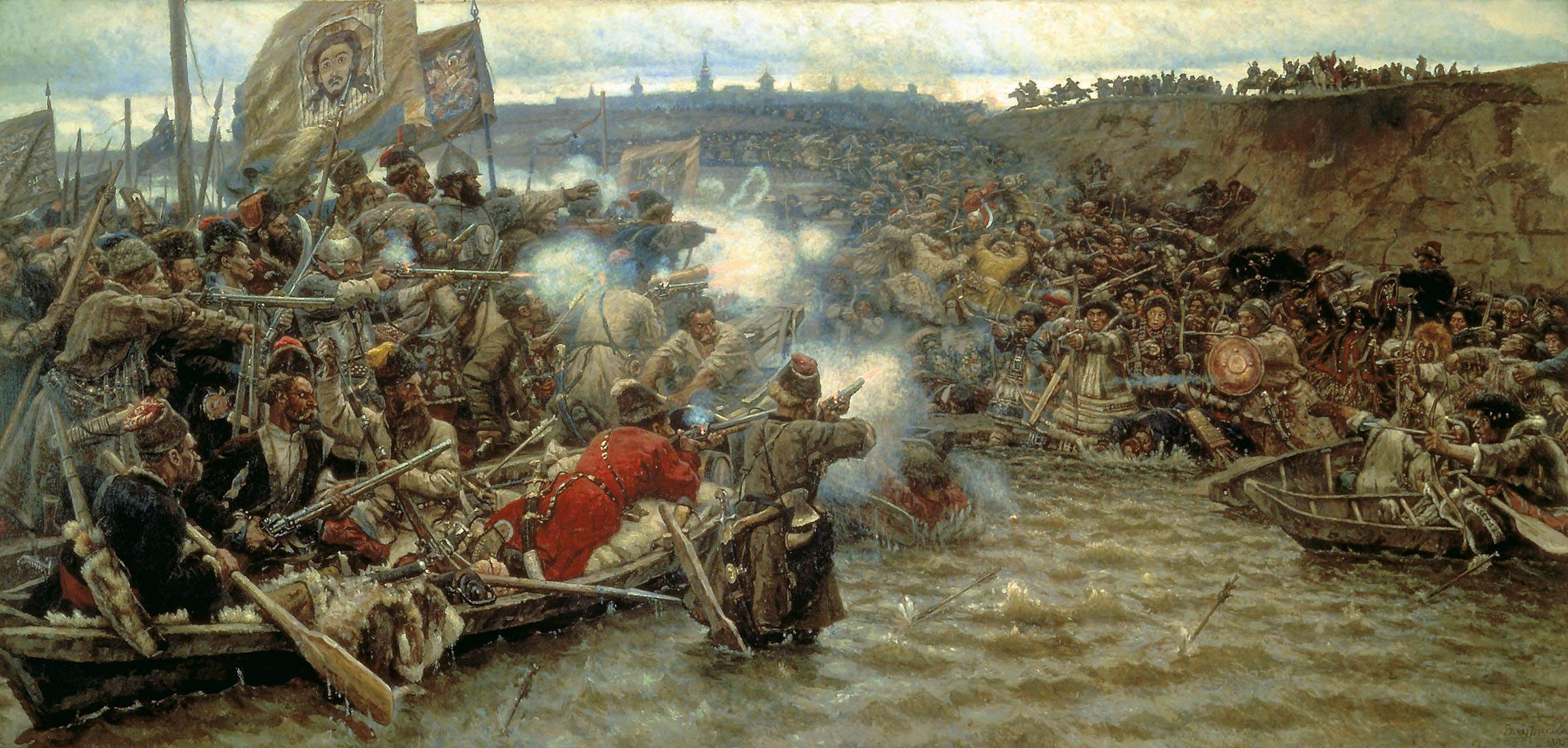
The Russian conquest of Siberia began in July 1580 when some 540 Cossacks under Yermak Timofeyevich invaded the territory of the Voguls, subjects to Küçüm, the Khan of Siberia.

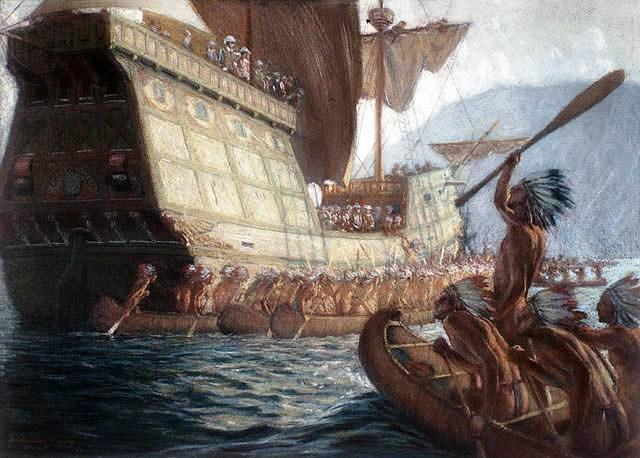
The French navigator Samuel de Champlain founded Quebec City, New France (modern Canada) in 1608.

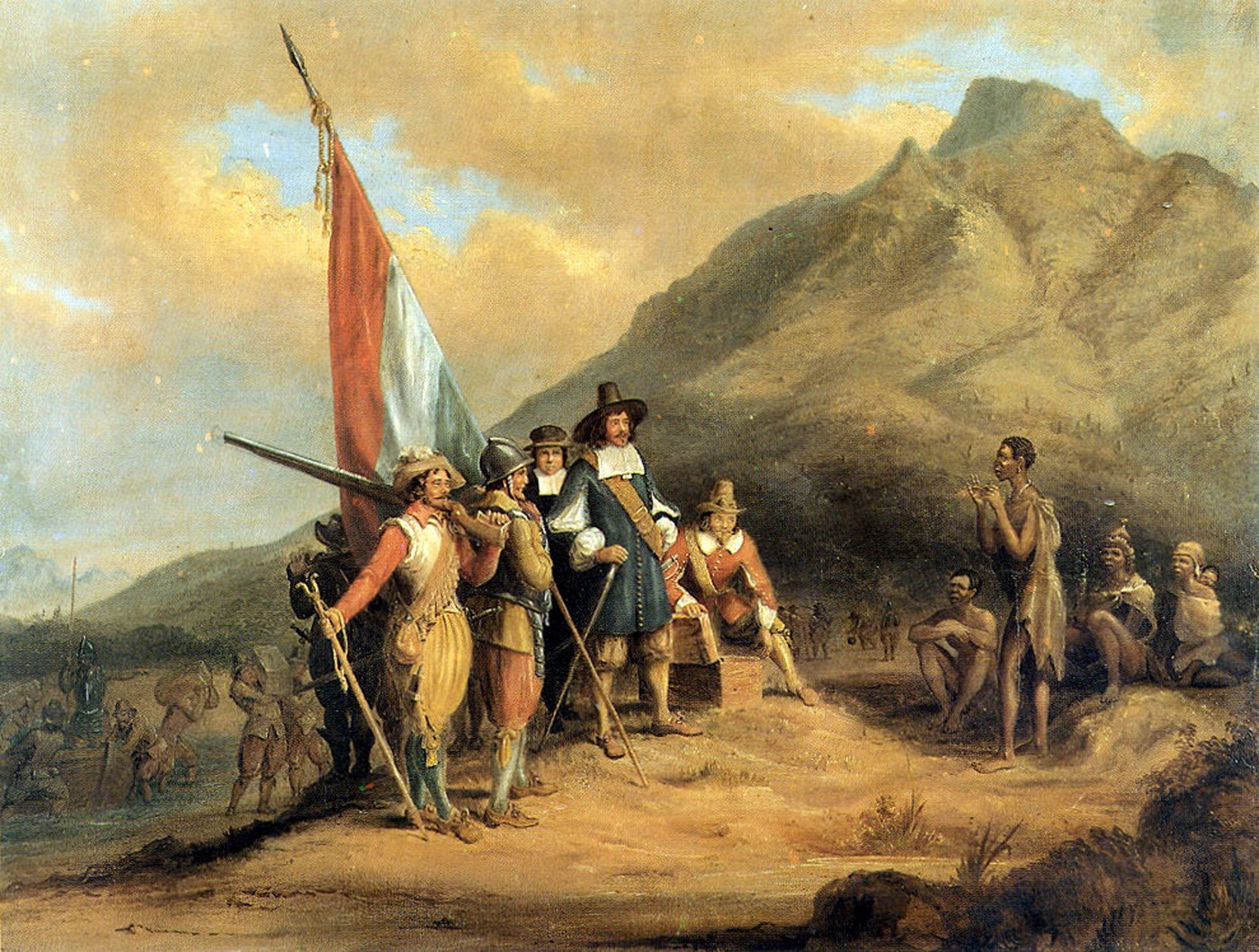
The arrival of Jan van Riebeeck, leading the first European settlement in South Africa.

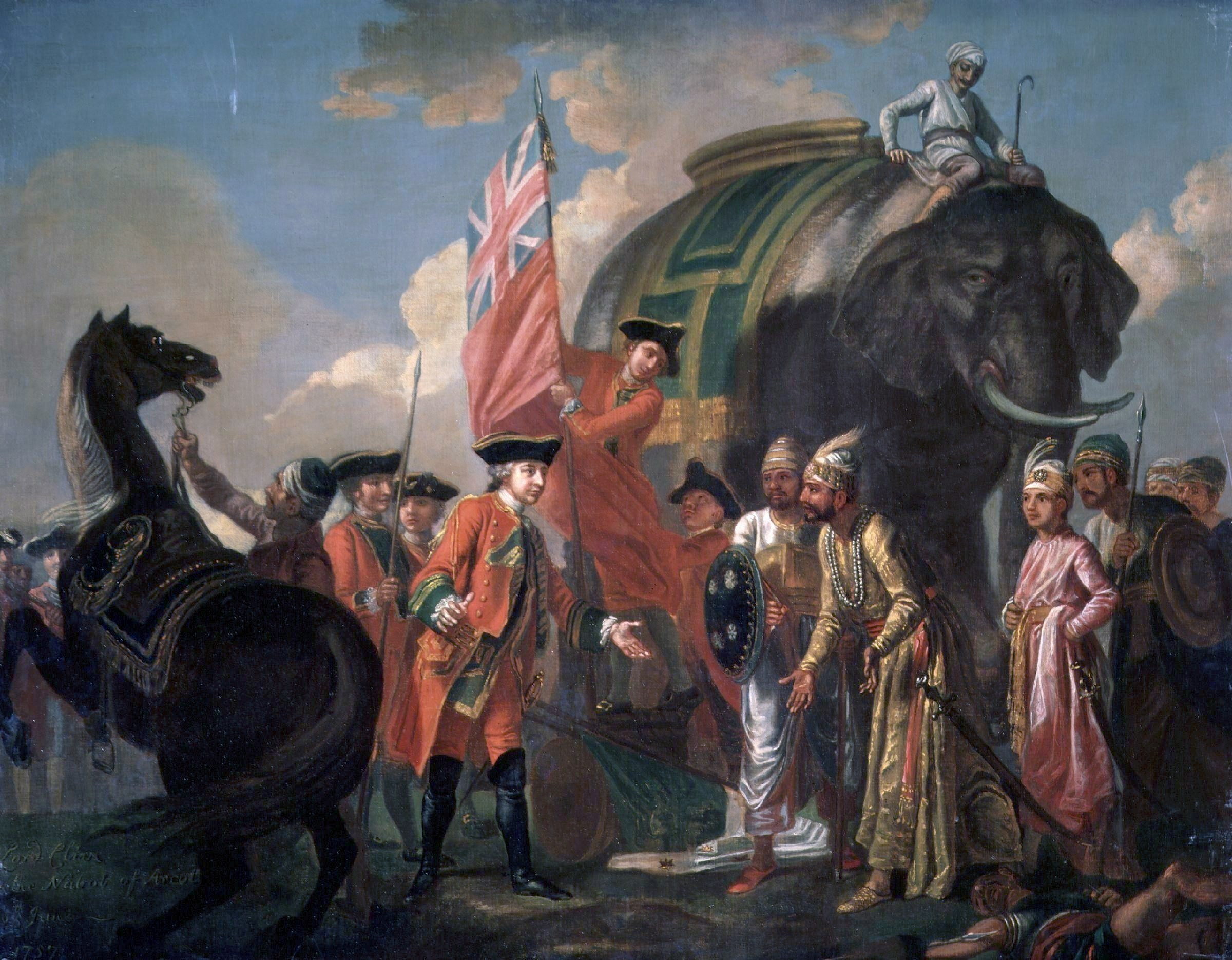
Robert Clive, 1st Baron Clive, became the first British governor of Bengal and was a key figure in the establishment of British India.

From its dawn until modern times, the West had suffered invasions from Africa, Asia, and non-Western parts of Europe. By 1500 Westerners took advantage of their new technologies, sallied forth into unknown waters, expanded their power and the Age of Discovery began, with Western explorers from seafaring nations like Portugal and Castile (later Spain) and later Holland, France and England setting forth from the "Old World" to chart faraway shipping routes and discover "new worlds".

In 1492, the Genovese born mariner, Christopher Columbus set out under the auspices of the Crown of Castile (Spain) to seek an oversea route to the East Indies via the Atlantic Ocean. Rather than Asia, Columbus landed in the Bahamas, in the Caribbean. Spanish colonization followed and Europe established Western Civilization in the Americas. The Portuguese explorer Vasco da Gama led the first sailing expedition directly from Europe to India in 1497–1499, by the Atlantic and Indian oceans, opening up the possibility of trade with the East other than via perilous overland routes like the Silk Road. Ferdinand Magellan, a Portuguese explorer working for the Spanish Crown (under the Crown of Castile), led an expedition in 1519–1522 which became the first to sail from the Atlantic Ocean into the Pacific Ocean and the first to cross the Pacific. The Spanish explorer Juan Sebastián Elcano completed the first circumnavigation of the Earth (Magellan was killed in the Philippines).

The Americas were deeply affected by European expansion, due to conquest, sickness, and introduction of new technologies and ways of life. The Spanish Conquistadors conquered most of the Caribbean islands and overran the two great New World empires: the Aztec Empire of Mexico and the Inca Empire of Peru. From there, Spain conquered about half of South America, all of Central America and much of North America. Portugal also expanded in the Americas, attempting to establish some fishing colonies in northern North America first (with a relatively limited duration) and conquering half of South America and calling their colony Brazil. These Western powers were aided not only by superior technology like gunpowder, but also by Old World diseases which they inadvertently brought with them, and which wiped out large segments of the Amerindian population. The native populations, called Indians by Columbus, since he originally thought he had landed in Asia (but often called Amerindians by scholars today), were converted to Catholicism and adopted the language of their rulers, either Spanish or Portuguese. They also adopted much of Western culture. Many Iberian settlers arrived, and many of them intermarried with the Amerindians resulting in a so-called Mestizo population, which became the majority of the population of Spain's American empires.

Other European colonial powers followed in their wake, most prominently the English, Dutch, and French. All three nations established colonies through North and South America and the West Indies. English colonies were established on Caribbean islands such as Barbados, Saint Kitts and Antigua and on North America (largely through a proprietary system) in regions such as Maryland, Massachusetts and Rhode Island. Dutch and French colonization efforts followed a similar pattern, focusing on the Caribbean and North America. The islands of Aruba, Curaçao and Sint Maarten gradually came under Dutch control, while the Dutch established the colony of New Netherland in North America. France gradually colonized Louisiana and Quebec during the 17th and 18th centuries, and transformed its West Indian colony of Saint-Domingue into the wealthiest European overseas possession in the 18th century through a slave-based plantation economy.

In the Americas, it seems that only the most remote peoples managed to stave off complete assimilation by Western and Western-fashioned governments. These include some of the northern peoples (i.e., Inuit), some peoples in the Yucatán, Amazonian forest dwellers, and various Andean groups. Of these, the Quechua people, Aymara people, and Maya people are the most numerous: at around 10–11 million, 2 million, and 7 million, respectively. Bolivia is the only country in the Americas with an indigenous majority.

Contact between the Old and New Worlds produced the Columbian Exchange, named after Columbus. It involved the transfer of goods unique to one hemisphere to another. Westerners brought cattle, horses, and sheep to the New World, and from the New World Europeans received tobacco, potatoes, and bananas. Other items becoming important in global trade were the sugarcane and cotton crops of the Americas, and the gold and silver brought from the Americas not only to Europe but elsewhere in the Old World.

As European settlers began to colonize the Americas, numerous cash crop plantations sprung up to accommodate increasing demand in Europe. Initially, the labour source of these plantations came from European indentured servants; however, soon this system was supplemented by enslaved Africans imported by European slavers from Africa to the Americas via the transatlantic slave trade. Roughly 12 million enslaved Africans were forcibly transported to the Americas, primarily to the West Indies and South America. Once there, they were primarily forced to work on these plantations in brutal conditions, cultivating crops such as sugar, cotton and tobacco. Together with European trade to Africa and American trade to Europe, this trade was known as the "triangular trade". Slavery continued to underpin the economies of European colonies throughout the Americas until the abolitionist movement and slave resistance led to its abolition in the 19th century.

After trading with African rulers for some time, Westerners began establishing colonies in Africa. The Portuguese conquered ports in North, West and East Africa and inland territory in what is today Angola and Mozambique. They also established relations with the Kingdom of Kongo in central Africa before, and eventually the Kongolese converted to Catholicism. The Dutch established colonies in modern-day South Africa, which attracted many Dutch settlers. Western powers also established colonies in West Africa. However, most of the continent remained unknown to Westerners and their colonies were restricted to Africa's coasts.

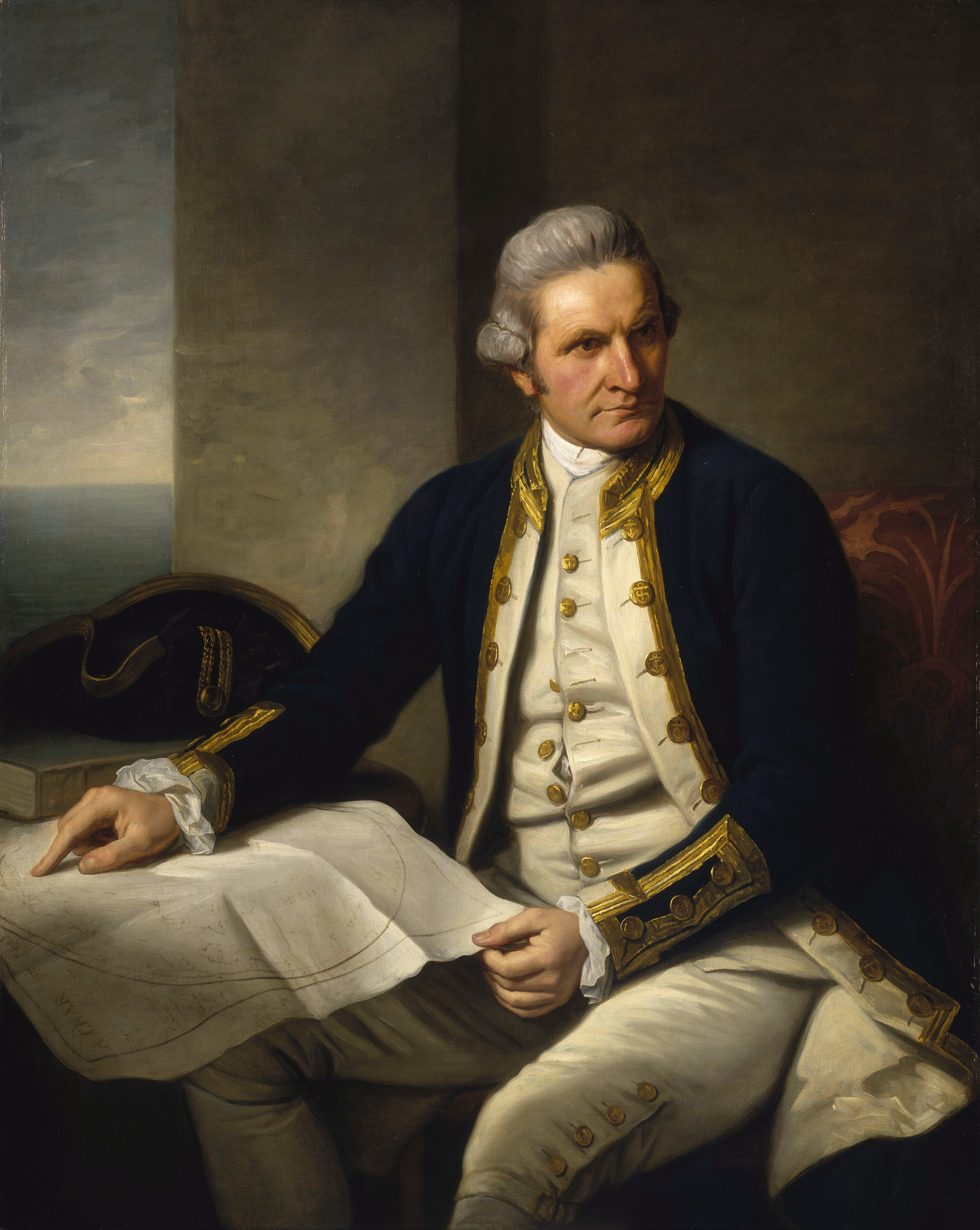
The British navigator Captain James Cook led three great voyages of discovery in the Pacific, mapping the East Coast of Australia, sailing into the Antarctic Circle and becoming the first European to reach Hawaii.

Westerners also expanded in Asia. The Portuguese controlled port cities in the East Indies, India, Persian Gulf, Sri Lanka, Southeast Asia and China. During this time, the Dutch began their colonisation of the Indonesian archipelago, which became the Dutch East Indies in the early 19th century, and gained port cities in Sri Lanka and Malaysia and India. Spain conquered the Philippines and converted the inhabitants to Catholicism. Missionaries from Iberia (including some from Italy and France) gained many converts in Japan until Christianity was outlawed by Japan's emperor. Some Chinese also became Christian, although most did not. Most of India was divided up between England and France.

As Western powers expanded they competed for land and resources. In the Caribbean, pirates attacked each other and the navies and colonial cities of countries, in hopes of stealing gold and other valuables from a ship or city. This was sometimes supported by governments. For example, England supported the pirate Sir Francis Drake in raids against the Spanish. Between 1652 and 1678, the three Anglo-Dutch wars were fought, of which the last two were won by the Dutch. At the end of the Napoleonic Wars, England gained New Netherland (which was traded with Suriname and Dutch South Africa). In 1756, the Seven Years' War, or French and Indian War began. It involved several powers fighting on several continents. In North America, English soldiers and colonial troops defeated the French, and in India the French were also defeated by England. In Europe Prussia defeated Austria. When the war ended in 1763, New France and eastern Louisiana were ceded to England, while western Louisiana was given to Spain. France's lands in India were ceded to England. Prussia was given rule over more territory in what is today Germany.

The Dutch navigator Willem Janszoon had been the first documented Westerner to land in Australia in 1606 Another Dutchman, Abel Tasman later touched mainland Australia, and mapped Tasmania and New Zealand for the first time, in the 1640s. The English navigator James Cook became first to map the east coast of Australia in 1770. Cook's extraordinary seamanship greatly expanded European awareness of far shores and oceans: his first voyage reported favourably on the prospects of colonisation of Australia; his second voyage ventured almost to Antarctica (disproving long held European hopes of an undiscovered Great Southern Continent); and his third voyage explored the Pacific coasts of North America and Siberia and brought him to Hawaii, where an ill-advised return after a lengthy stay saw him clubbed to death by natives.

Europe's period of expansion in early modern times greatly changed the world. New crops from the Americas improved European diets. This, combined with an improved economy thanks to Europe's new network of colonies, led to a demographic revolution in the West, with infant mortality dropping, and Europeans getting married younger and having more children. The West became more sophisticated economically, adopting Mercantilism, in which companies were state-owned and colonies existed for the good of the mother country.

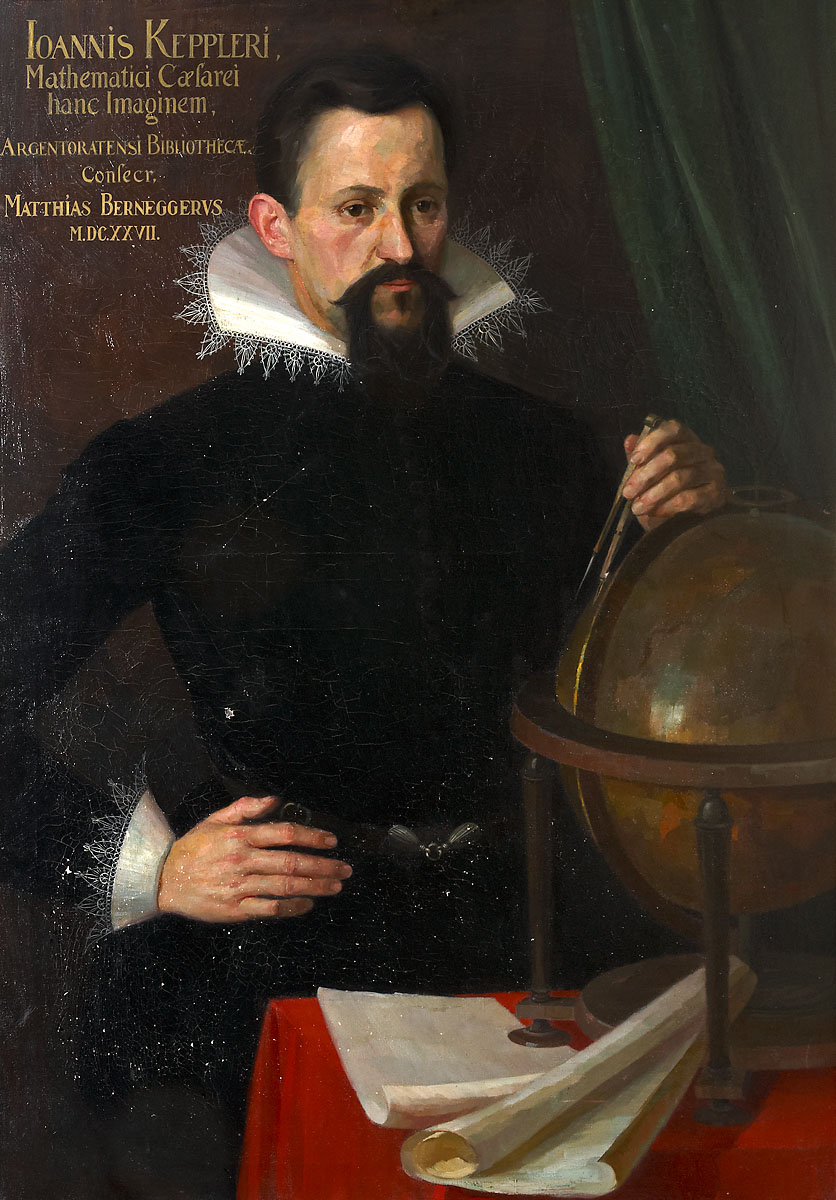
Johannes Kepler was one of the founders and fathers of modern astronomy, the scientific method, natural and modern science

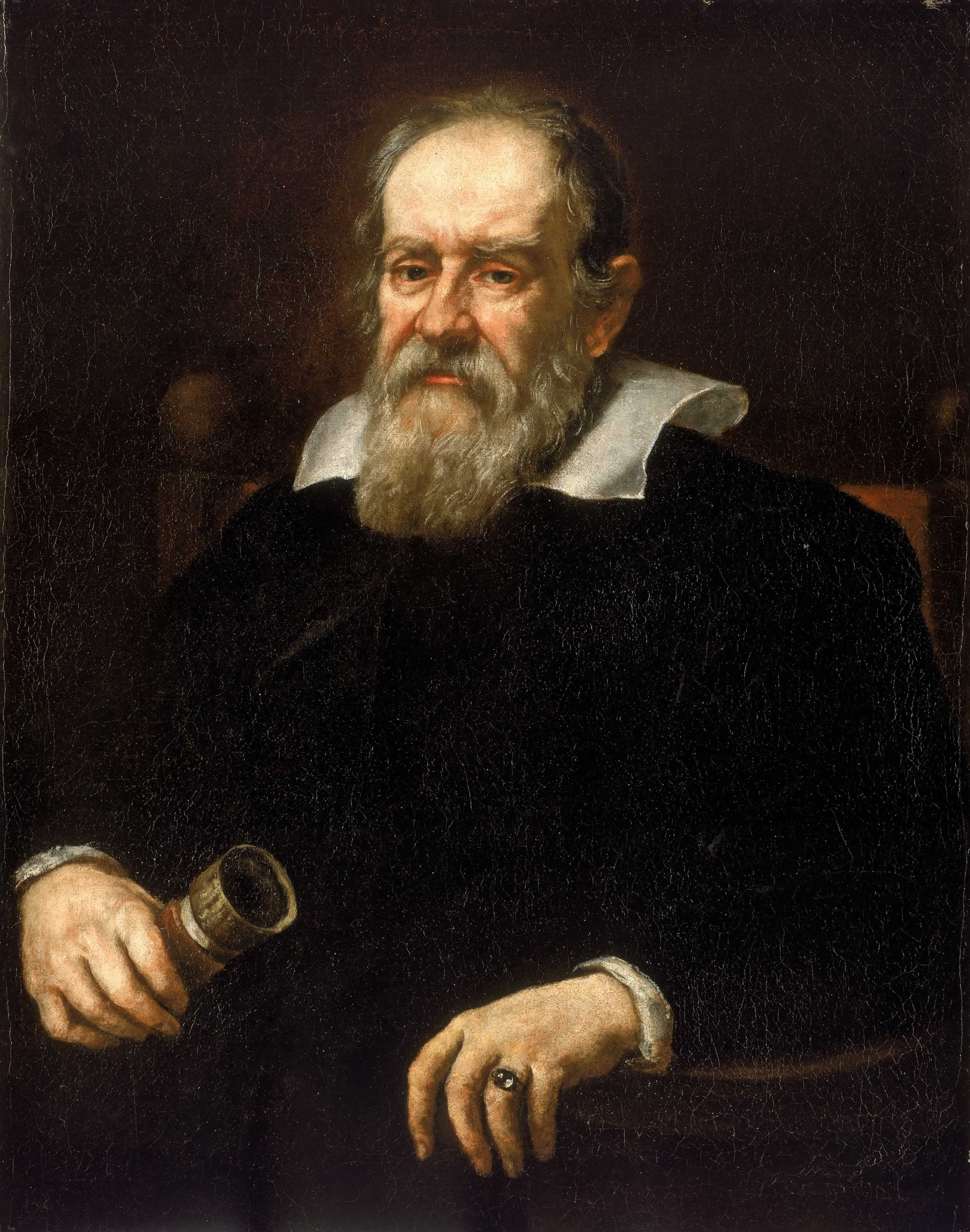
Galileo Galilei, father of modern science, physics and observational astronomy.

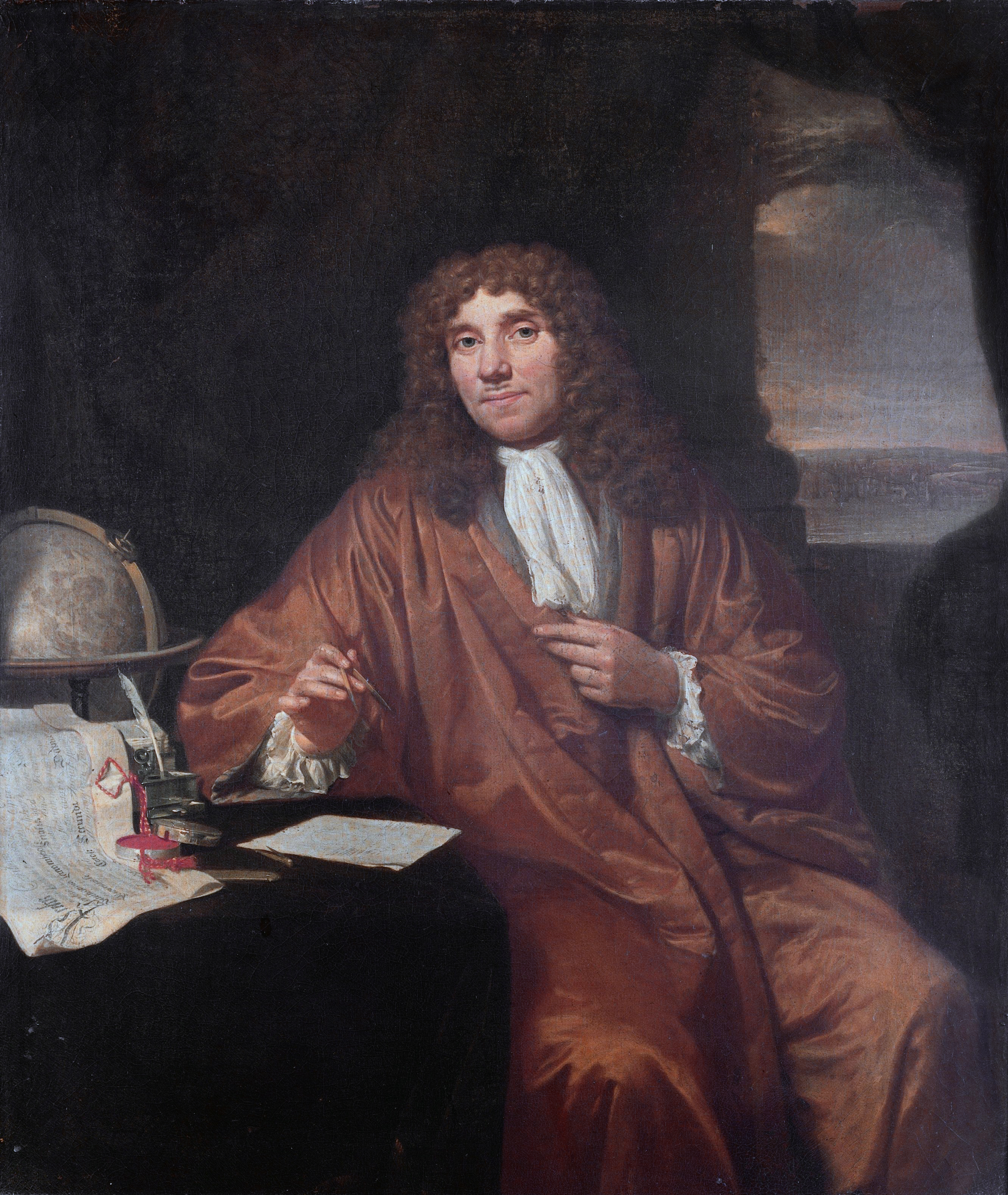
Antonie van Leeuwenhoek, the father of microbiology, cell biology and bacteriology.

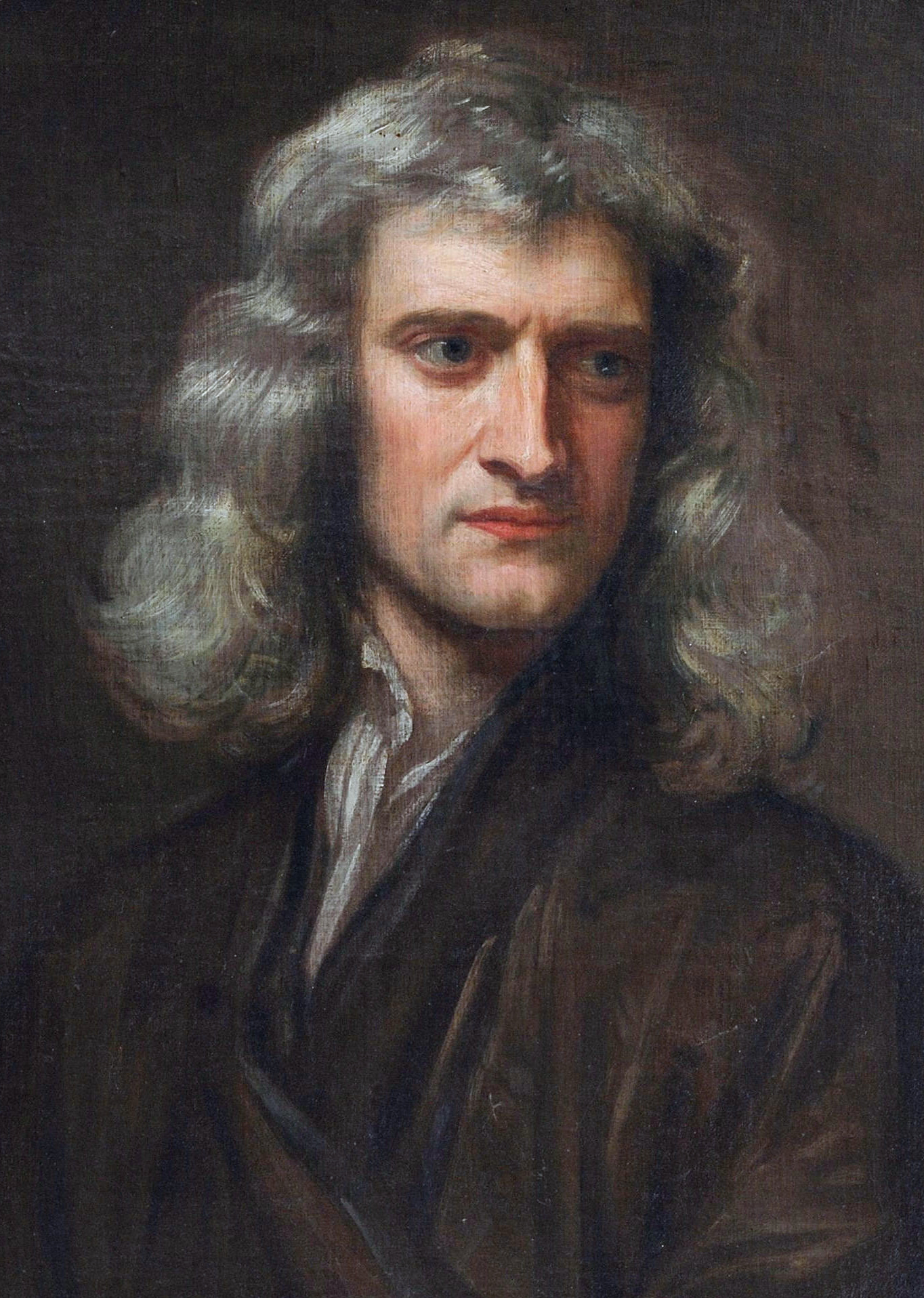
Isaac Newton discovered universal gravitation and the laws of motion.

In the Netherlands, the invention of the telescope and the microscope resulted in the investigation of the universe and the microscopic world. The father of modern science Galileo and Christiaan Huygens developed more advance telescopes and used these in their scientific research. The father of microbiology, Antonie van Leeuwenhoek pioneered the use of the microscope in the study of microbes and established microbiology as a scientific discipline. Advances in medicine and understanding of the human anatomy also increased in this time. Gerolamo Cardano partially invented several machines and introduced essential mathematics theories. In England, Sir Isaac Newton pioneered the science of physics. These events led to the so-called Scientific Revolution, which emphasized experimentation.

== Enlightenment ==
=== Absolutism and the Enlightenment: 1500–1800 ===
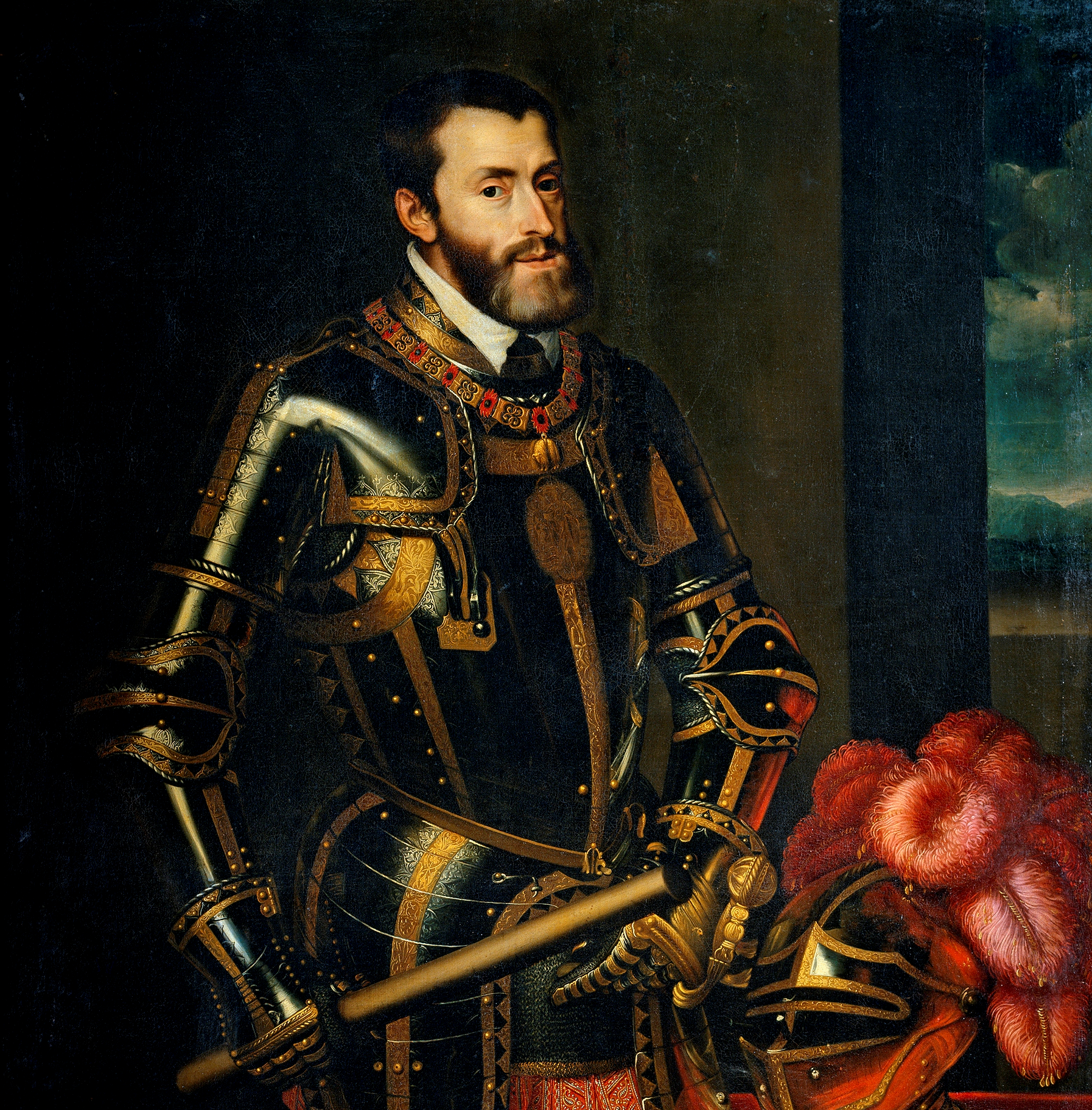
Charles V was ruler of the Holy Roman Empire from 1519 and, as Charles I, of the Spanish Empire from 1516 until his voluntary abdication in 1556.

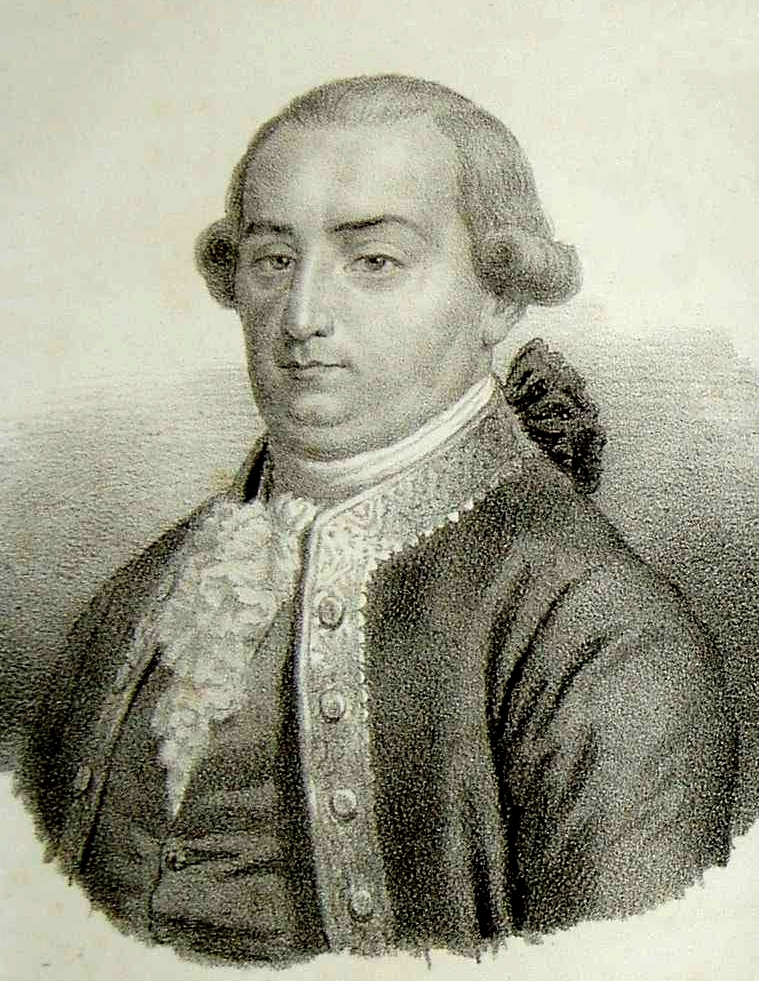
Cesare Beccaria was the most talented jurist of the Enlightenment and a father of classical criminal theory

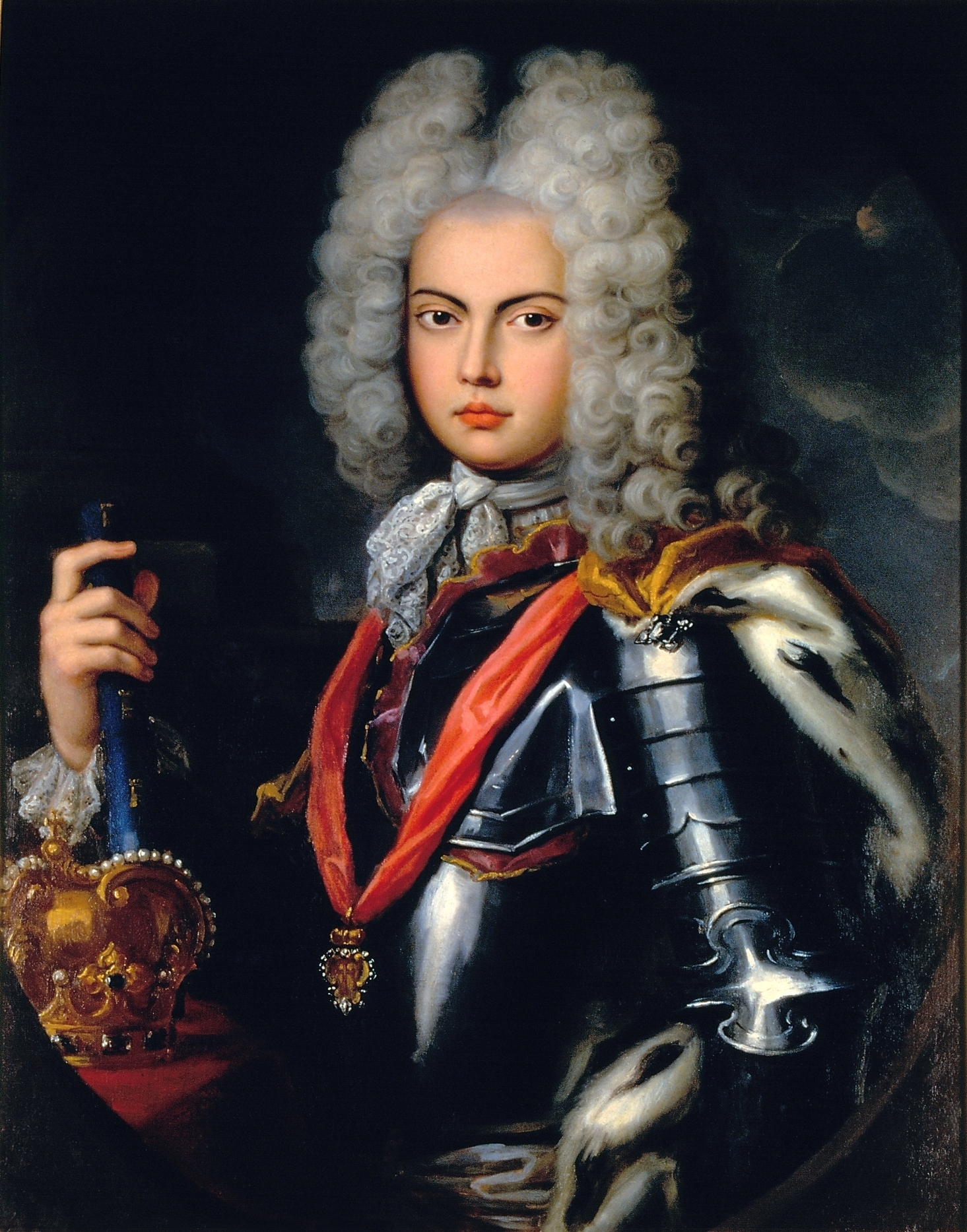
John V of Portugal's reign saw an exuberant period for Portugal, with colonial success and domestic production.

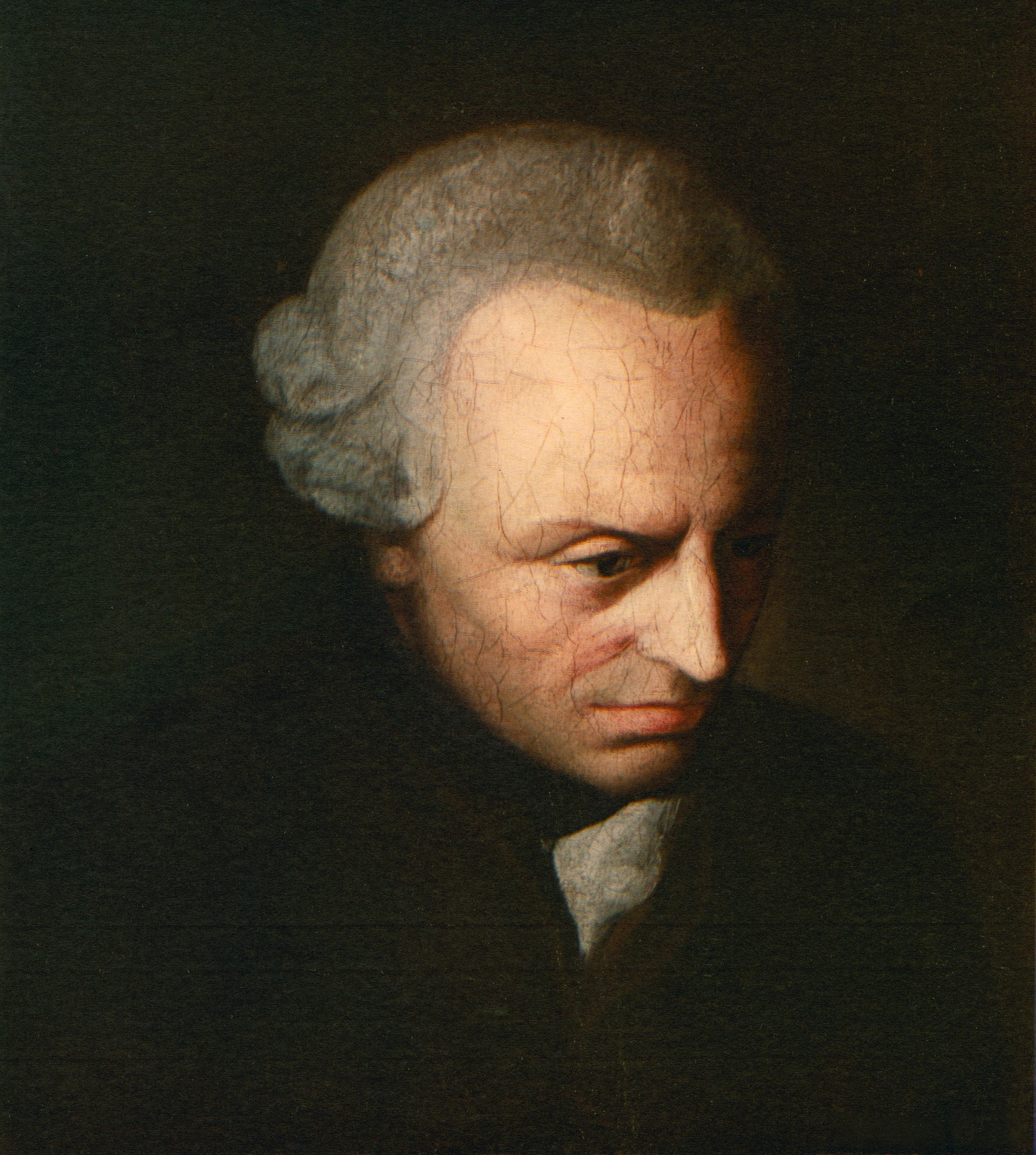
German philosopher Immanuel Kant, one of the most influential figures of Enlightenment and modern philosophy

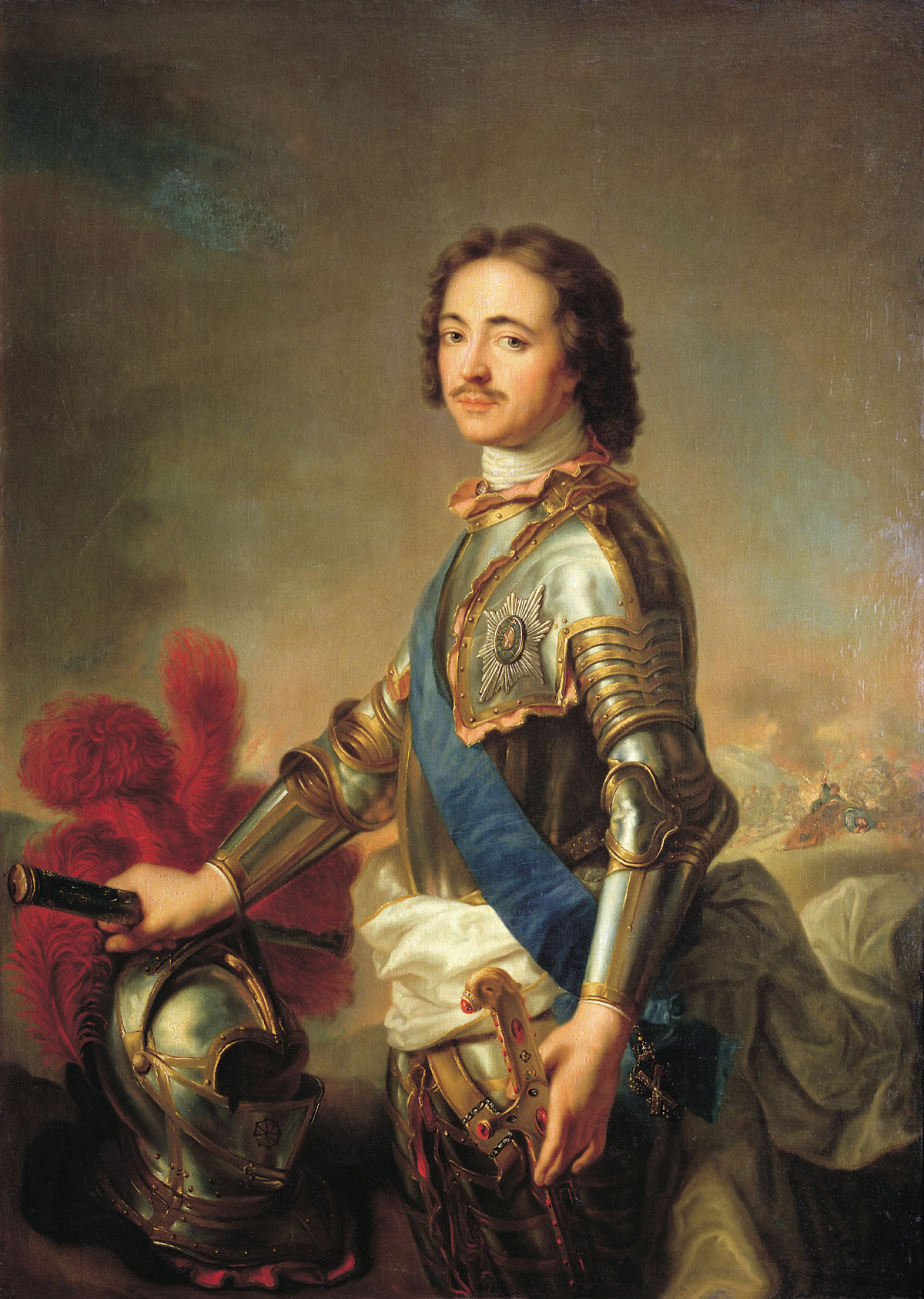
Portrait of Peter I of Russia (1672–1725). Under his reign, Russia looked westward. Heavily influenced by advisors from Western Europe, he implemented sweeping reforms aimed at modernizing Russia.

The West in the early modern era went through great changes as the traditional balance between monarchy, nobility and clergy shifted. With the feudal system all but gone, nobles lost their traditional source of power. Meanwhile, in Protestant countries, the church was now often headed by a monarch, while in Catholic countries, conflicts between monarchs and the Church rarely occurred and monarchs were able to wield greater power than they ever had in Western history. Under the doctrine of the Divine right of kings, monarchs believed they were only answerable to God: thus giving rise to absolutism.

At the opening of the 15th century, tensions were still going on between Islam and Christianity. Europe, dominated by Christians, remained under threat from the Muslim Ottoman Turks. The Turks had migrated from central to western Asia and converted to Islam years earlier. Their capture of Constantinople in 1453, thus extinguishing the Eastern Roman Empire, was a crowning achievement for the new Ottoman Empire. They continued to expand across the Middle East, North Africa and the Balkans. Under the leadership of the Spanish, a Christian coalition destroyed the Ottoman navy at the battle of Lepanto in 1571 ending their naval control of the Mediterranean. However, the Ottoman threat to Europe was not ended until a Polish led coalition defeated the Ottoman at the Battle of Vienna in 1683. The Turks were driven out of Buda (the eastern part of Budapest they had occupied for a century), Belgrade, and Athens – though Athens was to be recaptured and held until 1829.

The 16th century is often called Spain's Siglo de Oro (golden century). From its colonies in the Americas it gained large quantities of gold and silver, which helped make Spain the richest and most powerful country in the world. One of the greatest Spanish monarchs of the era was Charles I (1516–1556, who also held the title of Holy Roman Emperor Charles V). His attempt to unite these lands was thwarted by the divisions caused by the Reformation and ambitions of local rulers and rival rulers from other countries. Another great monarch was Philip II (1556–1598), whose reign was marked by several Reformation conflicts, like the loss of the Netherlands and the Spanish Armada. These events and an excess of spending would lead to a great decline in Spanish power and influence by the 17th century.

After Spain began to decline in the 17th century, the Dutch, by virtue of its sailing ships, became the greatest world power, leading the 17th century to be called the Dutch Golden Age. The Dutch followed Portugal and Spain in establishing an overseas colonial empire – often under the corporate colonialism model of the East India and West India Companies. After the Anglo-Dutch Wars, France and England emerged as the two greatest powers in the 18th century.

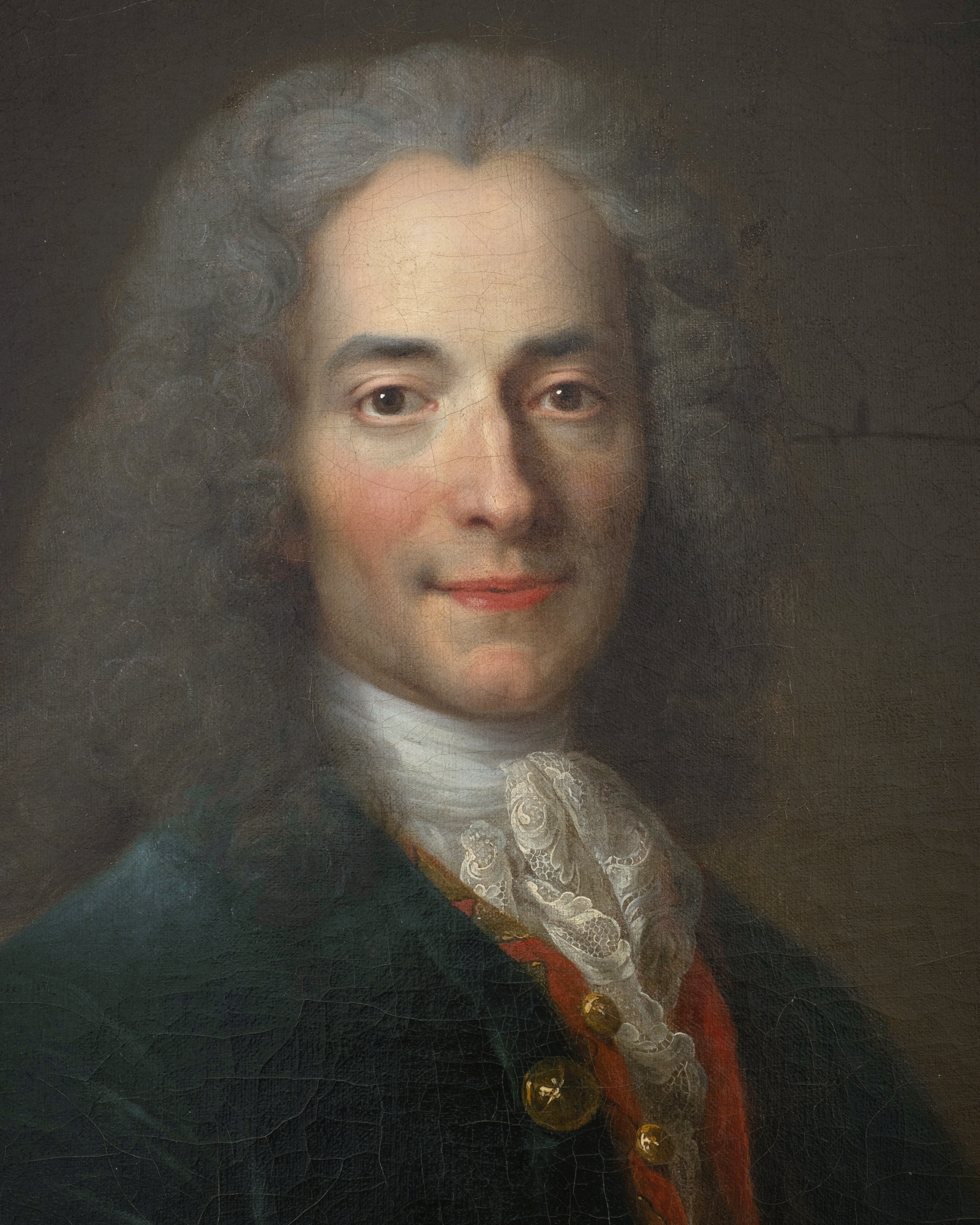
Voltaire, French Enlightenment writer, philosopher and wit.

Louis XIV became king of France in 1643. His reign was one of the most opulent in European history. He built a large palace in the town of Versailles.

The Holy Roman Emperor exerted no great influence on the lands of the Holy Roman Empire by the end of the Thirty Years' War. In the north of the empire, Prussia emerged as a powerful Protestant nation. Under many gifted rulers, like King Frederick the Great, Prussia expanded its power and defeated its rival Austria many times in war. Ruled by the Habsburg dynasty, Austria became a great empire, expanding at the expense of the Ottoman Empire and Hungary.

One land where absolutism did not take hold was England, which had trouble with revolutionaries. Elizabeth I, daughter of Henry VIII, had left no direct heir to the throne. The rightful heir was actually James VI of Scotland, who was crowned James I of England. James's son, Charles I resisted the power of Parliament. When Charles attempted to shut down Parliament, the Parliamentarians rose up and soon all of England was involved in a civil war. The English Civil War ended in 1649 with the defeat and execution of Charles I. Parliament declared a kingless Commonwealth but soon appointed the anti-absolutist leader and staunch Puritan Oliver Cromwell as Lord Protector. Cromwell enacted many unpopular Puritan religious laws in England, like outlawing alcohol and theaters, although religious diversity may have grown. (It was Cromwell, after all, that invited the Jews back into England after the Edict of Expulsion.) After his death, the monarchy was restored under Charles's son, who was crowned Charles II. His brother, James II succeeded him. James and his infant son James Francis Edward Stuart were Catholics.

Not wanting to be ruled by a Catholic dynasty, Parliament invited James's daughter Mary and her husband William of Orange, to rule as co-monarchs. They agreed on the condition James would not be harmed. Realizing he could not count on the Protestant English army to defend him, he abdicated following the Glorious Revolution of 1688. Before William III and Mary II were crowned however, Parliament forced them to sign the English Bill of Rights, which guaranteed some basic rights to all Englishmen, granted religious freedom to non-Anglican Protestants, and firmly established the rights of Parliament. In 1707, the Act of Union of 1707 were passed by the parliaments of Scotland and England, merging Scotland and England into a single Kingdom of Great Britain, with a single parliament. This new kingdom also controlled Ireland which had previously been conquered by England. Following the Irish Rebellion of 1798, in 1801 Ireland was formally merged with Great Britain to form the United Kingdom of Great Britain and Ireland. Ruled by the Protestant Ascendancy, Ireland eventually became an English-speaking land, though the majority population preserved distinct cultural and religious outlooks, remaining predomininantly Catholic except in parts of Ulster and Dublin. By then, the British experience had already contributed to the American Revolution.

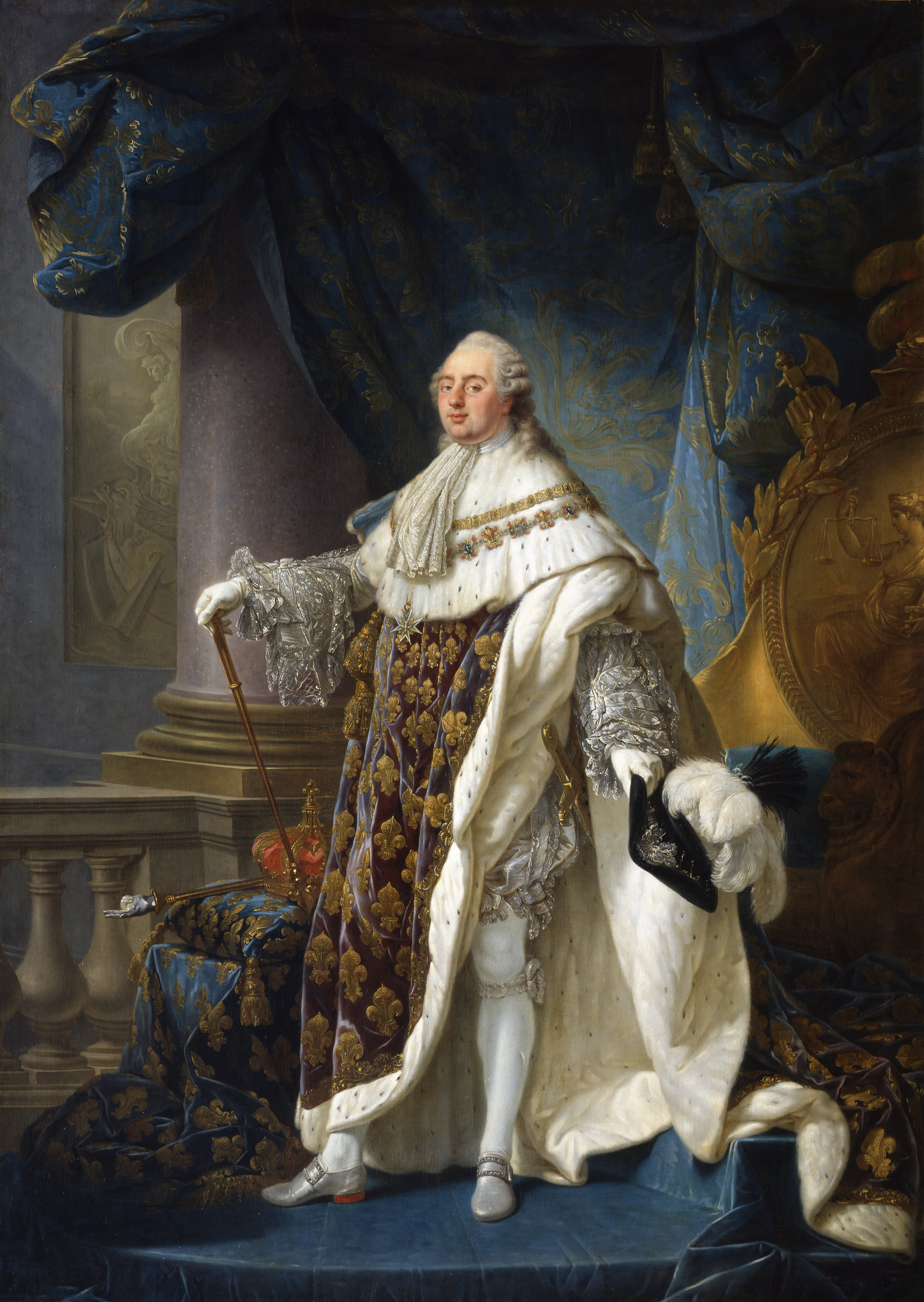
Louis XVI of France by Antoine-François Callet.

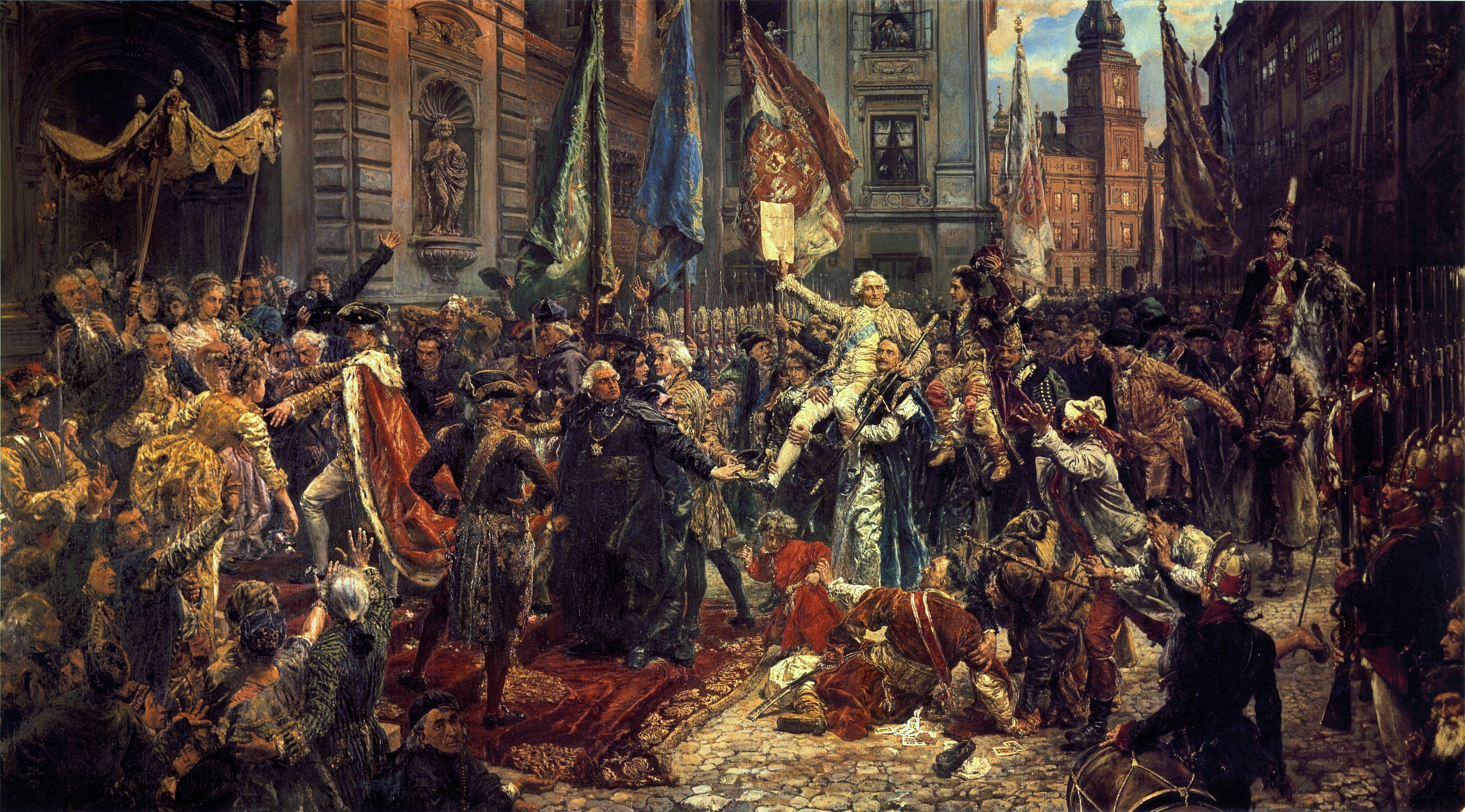
3 May Constitution, by Matejko (1891). King Stanisław August (left) enters St. John's Cathedral, where deputies will swear to uphold the Constitution. Background: Warsaw's Royal Castle, where it has just been adopted.

The Polish–Lithuanian Commonwealth was an important European center for the development of modern social and political ideas. It was famous for its rare quasi-democratic political system, praised by philosophers such as Erasmus; and, during the Counter-Reformation, was known for near-unparalleled religious tolerance, with peacefully coexisting Catholic, Jewish, Eastern Orthodox, Protestant and Muslim communities. With its political system the Commonwealth gave birth to political philosophers such as Andrzej Frycz Modrzewski (1503–1572), Wawrzyniec Grzymała Goślicki (1530–1607) and Piotr Skarga (1536–1612). Later, works by Stanisław Staszic (1755–1826) and Hugo Kołłątaj (1750–1812) helped pave the way for the Constitution of 3 May 1791, which historian Norman Davies calls "the first constitution of its kind in Europe". Polish–Lithuanian Commonwealth's constitution enacted revolutionary political principles for the first time on the European continent. The Komisja Edukacji Narodowej, Polish for Commission of National Education, formed in 1773, was the world's first national Ministry of Education and an important achievement of the Polish Enlightenment.

The intellectual movement called the Age of Enlightenment began in this period as well. Its proponents opposed the absolute rule of the monarchs, and instead emphasized the equality of all individuals and the idea that governments should derive their existence from the consent of the governed. Enlightenment thinkers called philosophes (French for philosophers) idealized Europe's classical heritage. They looked at Athenian democracy and the Roman Republic as ideal governments. They believed reason held the key to creating an ideal society.

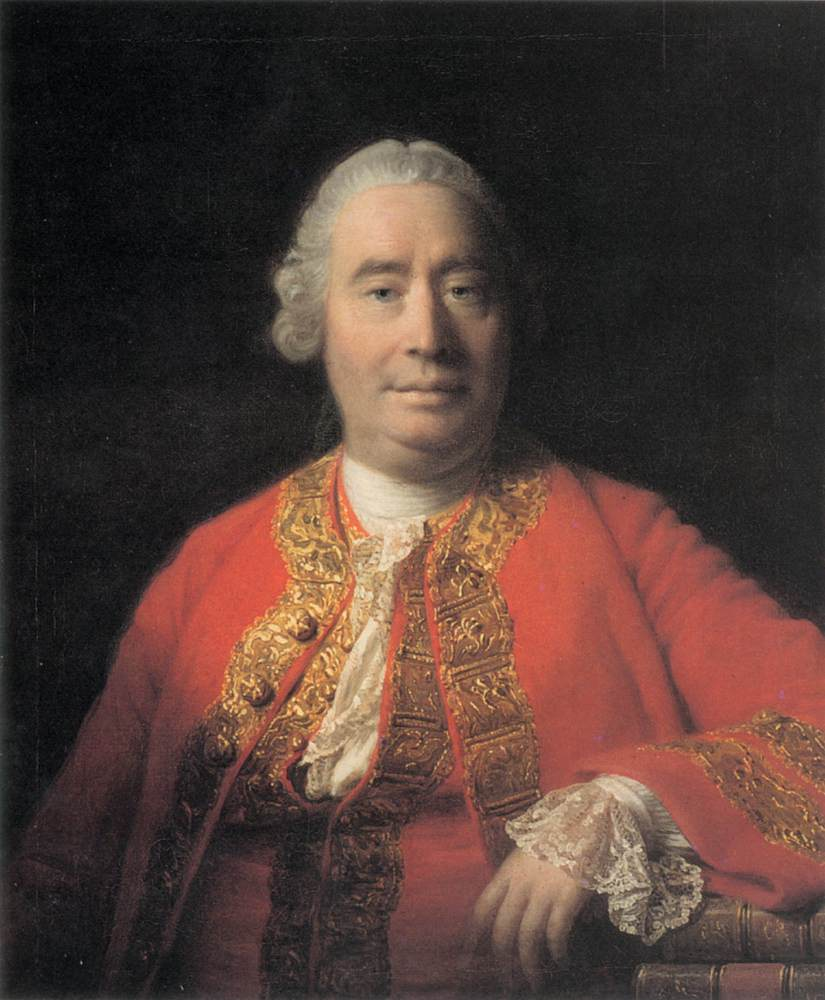
David Hume, an important figure in the Scottish Enlightenment

The Englishman Francis Bacon espoused the idea that senses should be the primary means of knowing, while the Frenchman René Descartes advocated using reason over the senses. In his works, Descartes was concerned with using reason to prove his own existence and the existence of the external world, including God. Another belief system became popular among philosophes, Deism, which taught that a single god had created but did not interfere with the world. This belief system never gained popular support and largely died out by the early 19th century.

Thomas Hobbes was an English philosopher, best known today for his work on political philosophy. His 1651 book Leviathan established the foundation for most of Western political philosophy from the perspective of social contract theory. The theory was examined also by John Locke (Second Treatise of Government (1689)) and Rousseau (Du contrat social (1762)). Social contract arguments examine the appropriate relationship between government and the governed and posit that individuals unite into political societies by a process of mutual consent, agreeing to abide by common rules and accept corresponding duties to protect themselves and one another from violence and other kinds of harm.

In 1690 John Locke wrote that people have certain natural rights like life, liberty and property and that governments were created in order to protect these rights. If they did not, according to Locke, the people had a right to overthrow their government. The French philosopher Voltaire criticized the monarchy and the Church for what he saw as hypocrisy and for their persecution of people of other faiths. Another Frenchman, Montesquieu, advocated division of government into executive, legislative and judicial branches. The French author Rousseau stated in his works that society corrupted individuals. Many monarchs were affected by these ideas, and they became known to history as the enlightened despots. However, most only supported Enlightenment ideas that strengthened their own power.

The Scottish Enlightenment was a period in 18th century Scotland characterised by an outpouring of intellectual and scientific accomplishments. Scotland reaped the benefits of establishing Europe's first public education system and a growth in trade which followed the Act of Union with England of 1707 and expansion of the British Empire. Important modern attitudes towards the relationship between science and religion were developed by the philosopher/historian David Hume. Adam Smith developed and published The Wealth of Nations, the first work in modern economics. He believed competition and private enterprise could increase the common good. The celebrated bard Robert Burns is still widely regarded as the national poet of Scotland.

European cities like Paris, London, and Vienna grew into large metropolises in early modern times. France became the cultural center of the West. The middle class grew even more influential and wealthy. Great artists of this period included El Greco, Rembrandt, and Caravaggio.

By this time, many around the world wondered how the West had become so advanced, for example, the Orthodox Christian Russians, who came to power after conquering the Mongols that had conquered Kiev in the Middle Ages. They began westernizing under Czar Peter the Great, although Russia remained uniquely part of its own civilization. The Russians became involved in European politics, dividing up the Polish–Lithuanian Commonwealth with Prussia and Austria.

=== Revolution: 1770–1815 ===
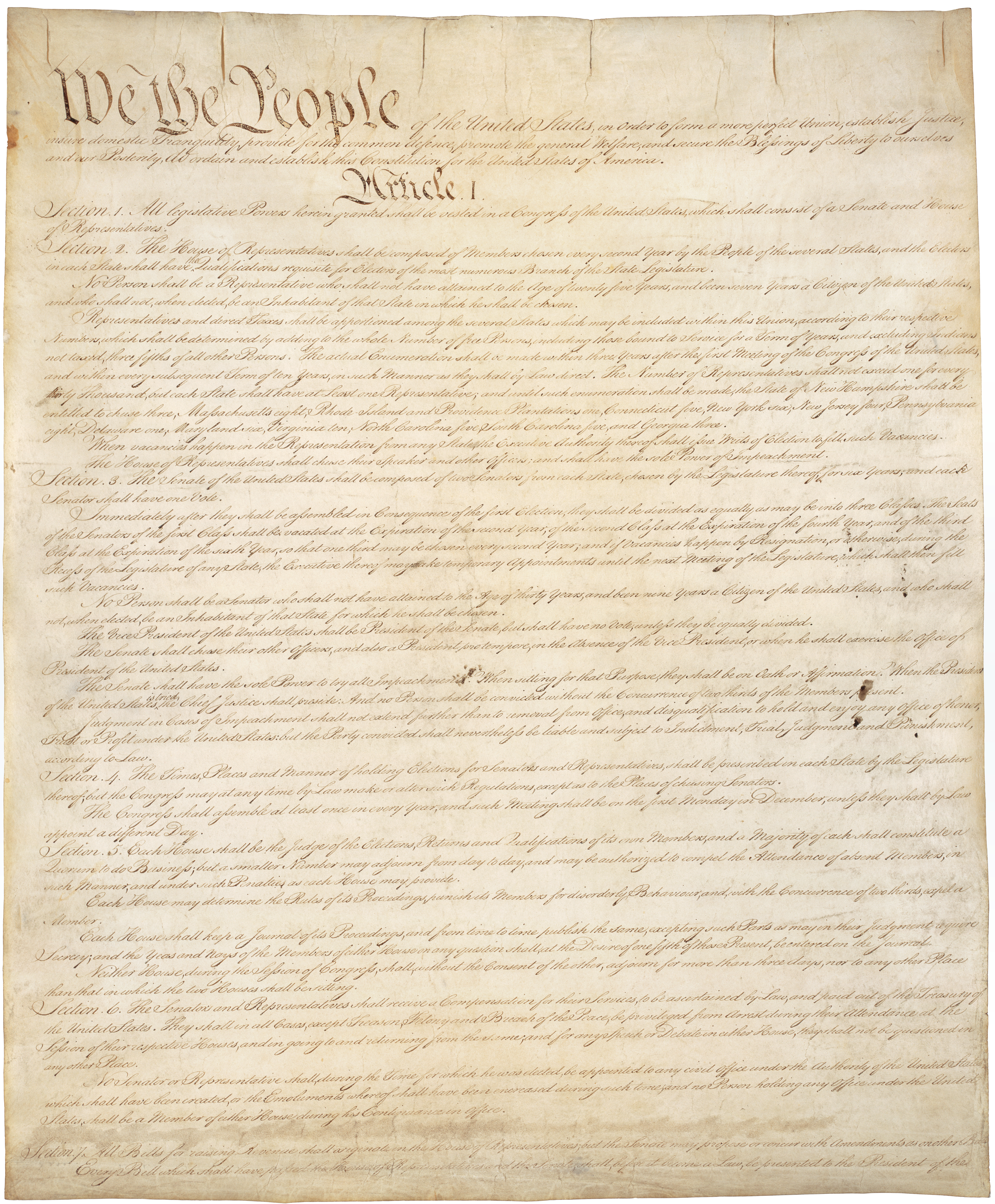
The U.S. Constitution

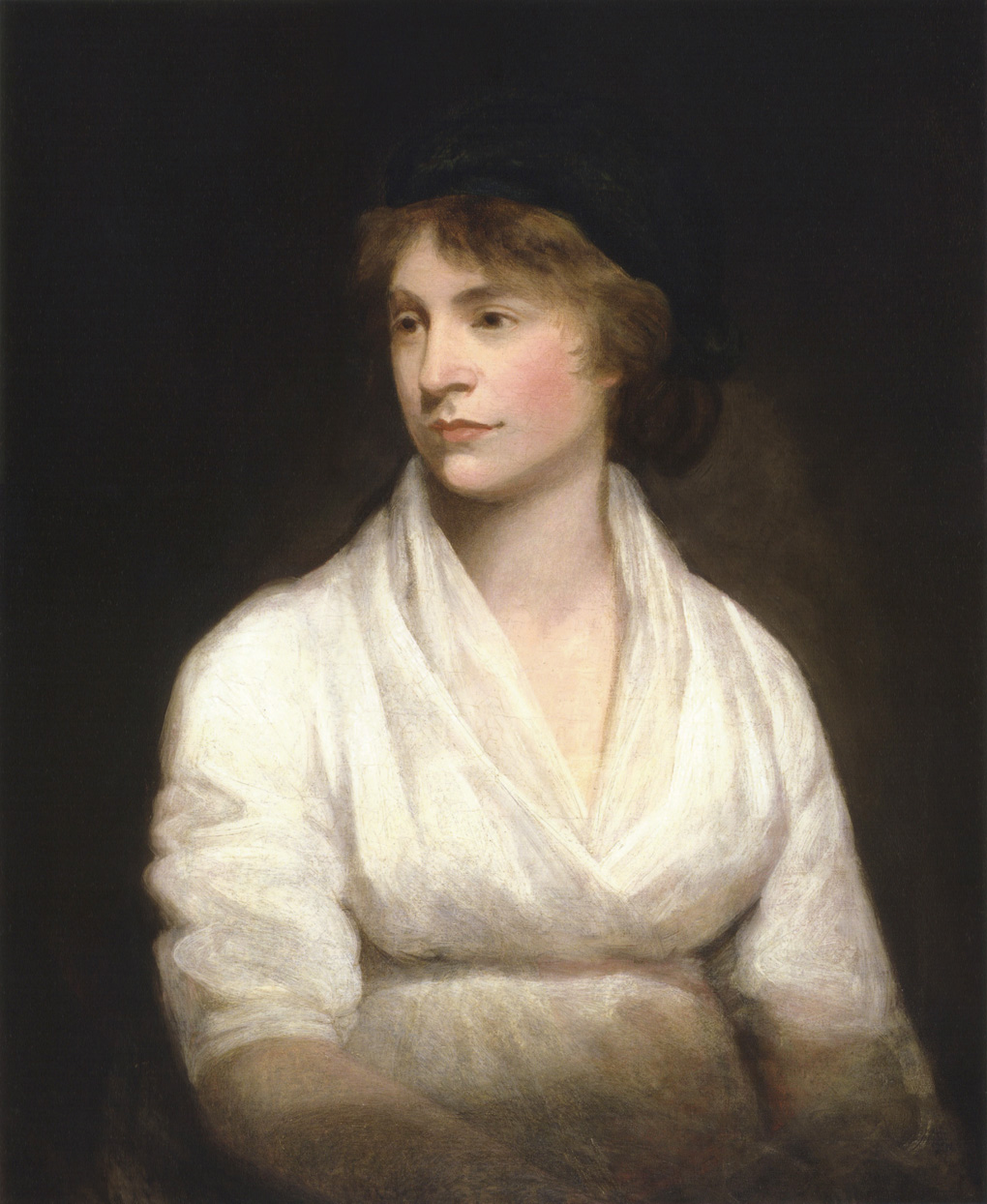
Mary Wollstonecraft, author of A Vindication of the Rights of Woman.

During the late 18th century and early 19th century, much of the West experienced a series of revolutions that would change the course of history, resulting in new ideologies and changes in society. The first of these revolutions began in North America. The Thirteen Colonies of British North America had by this period. The majority of the population was of English, Scottish, Welsh and Irish descent, while significant minorities included people of French, Dutch and German and Africa descent, as well as some Native Americans. Most of the population was Anglican, others were Congregationalist or Puritan, while minorities included other Protestant churches like the Society of Friends and the Lutherans, as well as some Roman Catholics and Jews. The colonies had their own great cities and universities and continually welcomed new immigrants, mostly from Britain. After the expensive Seven Years' War, Britain needed to raise revenue, and felt the colonists should bare the brunt of the new taxation it felt was necessary. The colonists greatly resented these taxes and protested the fact they could be taxed by Britain but had no representation in the government.

After Britain's King George III refused to seriously consider colonial grievances raised at the first Continental Congress, some colonists took up arms. Leaders of a new pro-independence movement were influenced by Enlightenment ideals and hoped to bring an ideal nation into existence. On 4 July 1776, the colonies declared independence with the signing of the United States Declaration of Independence. Drafted primarily by Thomas Jefferson, the document's preamble eloquently outlines the principles of governance that would come to increasingly dominate Western thinking over the ensuing century and a half:

We hold these truths to be self-evident, that all men are created equal, that they are endowed by their Creator with certain unalienable Rights, that among these are life, liberty and the pursuit of happiness. That to secure these rights, Governments are instituted among Men, deriving their just powers from the consent of the governed, That whenever any Form of Government becomes destructive of these ends, it is the Right of the People to alter or to abolish it, and to institute new Government.

George Washington led the new Continental Army against the British forces, who had many successes early in this American Revolution. After years of fighting, the colonists formed an alliance with France and defeated the British at Yorktown, Virginia in 1781. The treaty ending the war granted independence to the colonies, which became The United States of America.

The other major Western revolution at the turn of the 19th century was the French Revolution. In 1789 France faced an economical crisis. The King called, for the first time in more than two centuries, the Estates General, an assembly of representatives of each estate of the kingdom: the First Estate (the clergy), the Second Estate (the nobility), and the Third Estate (middle class and peasants); in order to deal with the crisis. As the French society was gained by the same Enlightenment ideals that led to the American revolution, in which many Frenchmen, such as Lafayette, took part; representatives of the Third Estate, joined by some representatives of the lower clergy, created the National Assembly, which, unlike the Estates General, provided the common people of France with a voice proportionate to their numbers.

The people of Paris feared the King would try to stop the work of the National Assembly and Paris was soon consumed with riots, anarchy, and widespread looting. The mobs soon had the support of the French Guard, including arms and trained soldiers, because the royal leadership essentially abandoned the city. On the fourteenth of July 1789 a mob stormed the Bastille, a prison fortress, which led the King to accept the changes. On 4 August 1789 the National Constituent Assembly abolished feudalism sweeping away both the seigneurial rights of the Second Estate and the tithes gathered by the First Estate. It was the first time in Europe, where feudalism was the norm for centuries, that such a thing happened. In the course of a few hours, nobles, clergy, towns, provinces, companies, and cities lost their special privileges.

At first, the revolution seemed to be turning France into a constitutional monarchy, but the other continental Europe powers feared a spread of the revolutionary ideals and eventually went to war with France. In 1792 King Louis XVI was imprisoned after he had been captured fleeing Paris and the Republic was declared. The Imperial and Prussian armies threatened retaliation on the French population should it resist their advance or the reinstatement of the monarchy. As a consequence, King Louis was seen as conspiring with the enemies of France. His execution on 21 January 1793 led to more wars with other European countries. During this period France effectively became a dictatorship after the parliamentary coup of the radical leaders, the Jacobin. Their leader, Robespierre oversaw the Reign of Terror, in which thousands of people deemed disloyal to the republic were executed. Finally, in 1794, Robespierre himself was arrested and executed, and more moderate deputies took power. This led to a new government, the French Directory. In 1799, a coup overthrew the Directory and General Napoleon Bonaparte seized power as dictator and even an emperor in 1804.

Liberté, égalité, fraternité (French for "Liberty, equality, fraternity"), now the national motto of France, had its origins during the French Revolution, though it was only later institutionalised. It remains another iconic motto of the aspirations of Western governance in the modern world.

Some influential intellectuals came to reject the excesses of the revolutionary movement. Political theorist Edmund Burke had supported the American Revolution, but turned against the French Revolution and developed a political theory which opposed governing based on abstract ideas, and preferred 'organic' reform. He is remembered as a father of modern Anglo-conservatism. In response to such critiques, the American revolutionary Thomas Paine published his book The Rights of Man in 1791 as a defence of the ideals of the French Revolution. The spirit of the age also produced early works of feminist philosophy – notably Mary Wollstonecraft's 1792 book: A Vindication of the Rights of Woman.

=== Napoleonic Wars ===
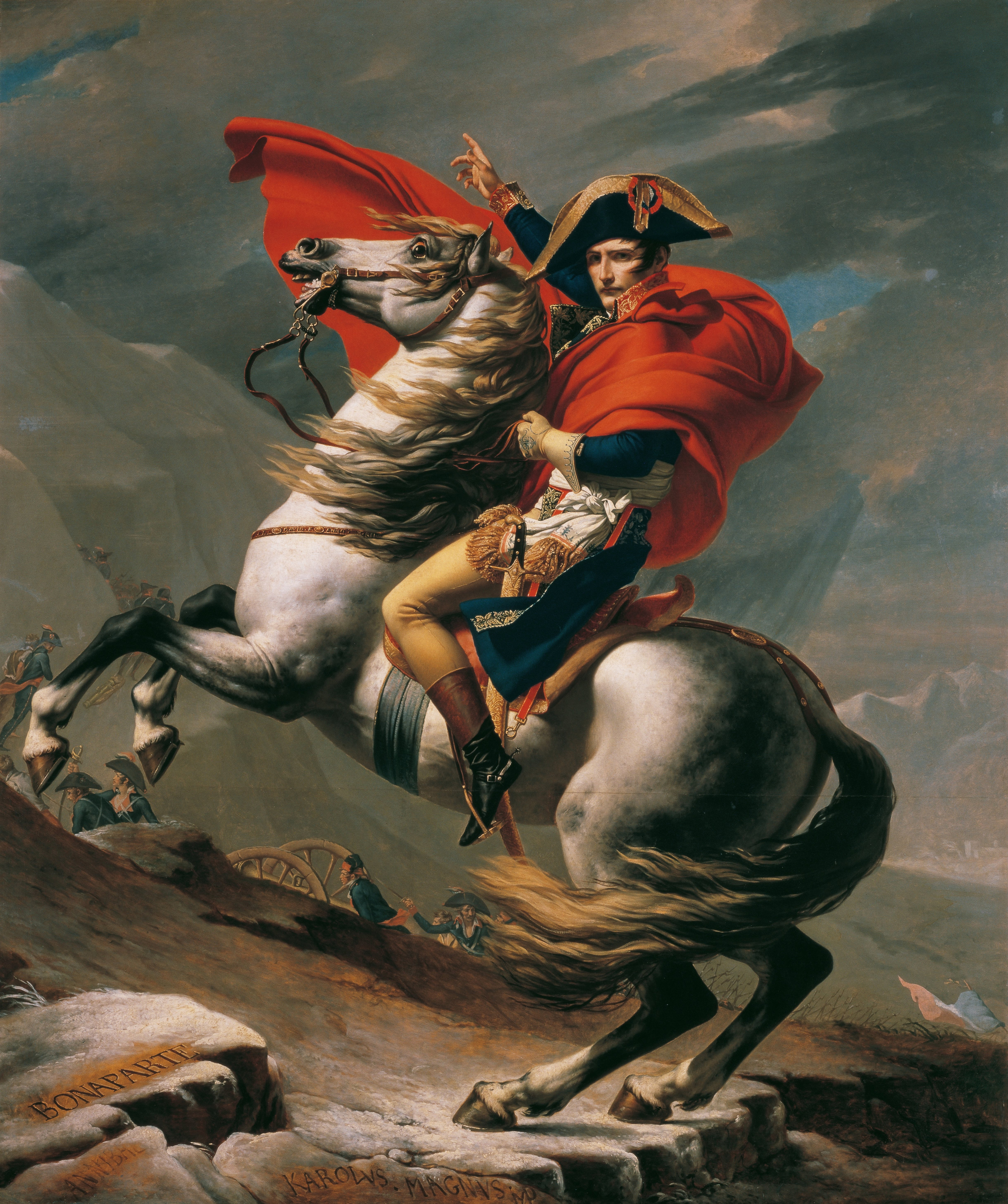
Napoleon Crossing the Alps (David). In 1800 Bonaparte took the French Army across the Alps, eventually defeating the Austrians at Marengo

The Napoleonic Wars were a series of conflicts involving Napoleon's French Empire and changing sets of European allies by opposing coalitions that ran from 1803 to 1815. As a continuation of the wars sparked by the French Revolution of 1789, they revolutionized European armies and played out on an unprecedented scale, mainly due to the application of modern mass conscription. French power rose quickly, conquering most of Europe, but collapsed rapidly after France's disastrous invasion of Russia in 1812. Napoleon's empire ultimately suffered complete military defeat resulting in the restoration of the Bourbon monarchy in France. The wars resulted in the dissolution of the Holy Roman Empire and sowed the seeds of nascent nationalism in Germany and Italy that would lead to the two nations' consolidation later in the century. Meanwhile, the Spanish Empire began to unravel as French occupation of Spain weakened Spain's hold over its colonies, providing an opening for nationalist revolutions in Spanish America. As a direct result of the Napoleonic Wars, the British Empire became the foremost world power for the next century, thus beginning Pax Britannica.

France had to fight on multiple battlefronts against the other European powers. A nationwide conscription was voted to reinforce the old royal army made of noble officers and professional soldiers. With this new kind of army, Napoleon was able to beat the European allies and dominate Europe. The revolutionary ideals, based no more on feudalism but on the concept of a sovereign nation, spread all over Europe. When Napoleon eventually lost and the monarchy reinstated in France, these ideals survived and led to the revolutionary waves of the 19th century that brought democracy to many European countries.

With the success of the American Revolution, the Spanish Empire also began to crumble as their American colonies sought independence as well. In 1808, when Joseph Bonaparte was installed as the Spanish King by the Napoleonic French, the Spanish resistance resorted to governing Juntas. When the Supreme Central Junta of Seville fell to the French in 1810, the Spanish American colonies developed themselves governing Juntas in the name of the deposed King Ferdinand VII (upon the concept known as "Retroversion of the sovereignty to the people"). As this process led to open conflicts between independentists and loyalists, the Spanish American Independence Wars immediately ensued; resulting, by the 1820s, in the definitive loss for the Spanish Empire of all its American territories, with the exception of Cuba and Puerto Rico.

== Rise of the English-speaking world: 1815–1870 ==
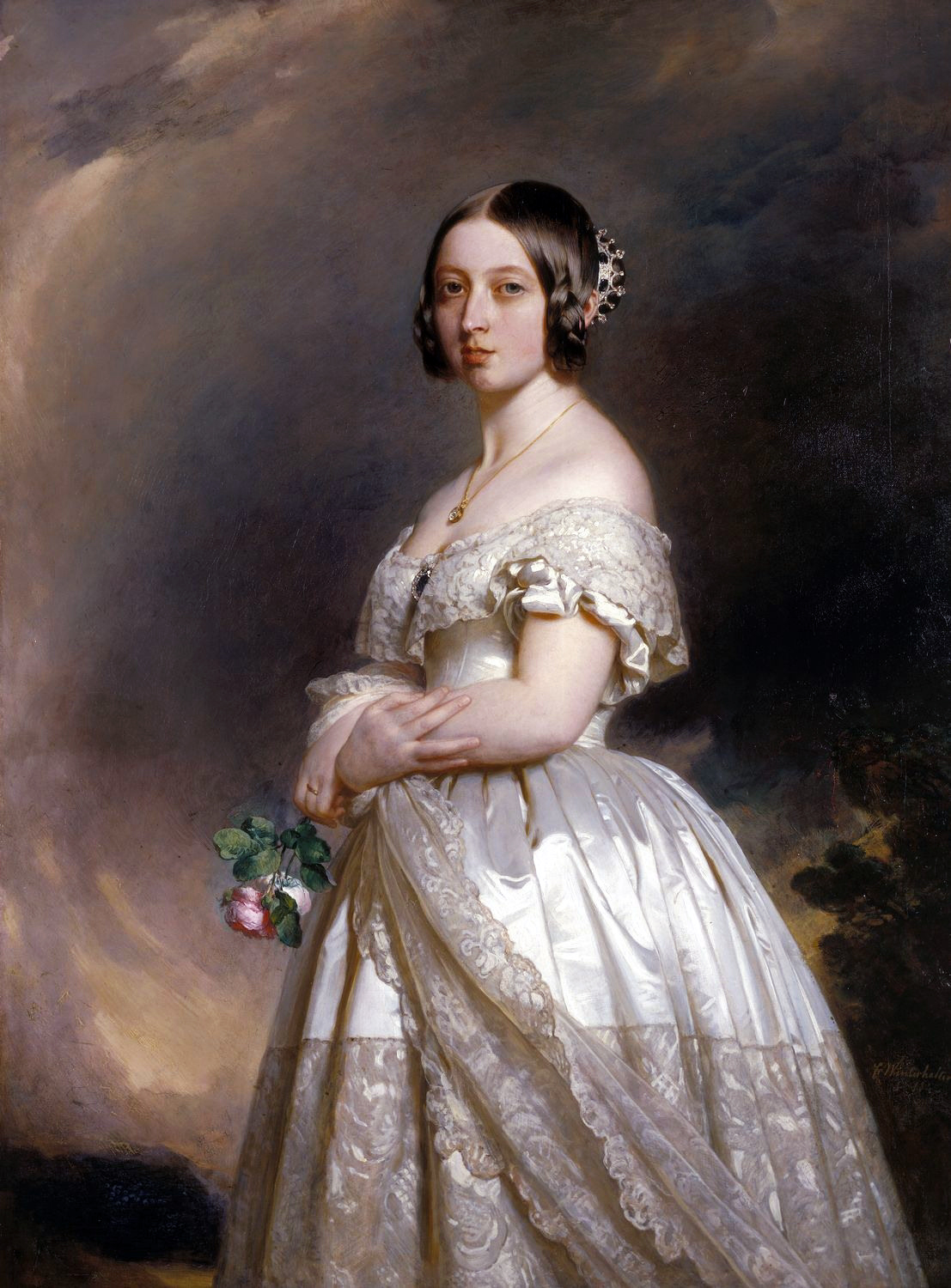
Queen Victoria in her early twenties, by Franz Xaver Winterhalter

The years following Britain's victory in the Napoleonic Wars were a period of expansion for Britain as it rebuilt the British Empire. The new United States grew even more rapidly. This period of expansion would help establish Anglicanism as the dominant religion, English as the dominant language, and English and Anglo-American culture as the dominant culture of two continents and many other lands outside the British Isles.

=== Industrial Revolution in the English-speaking world ===
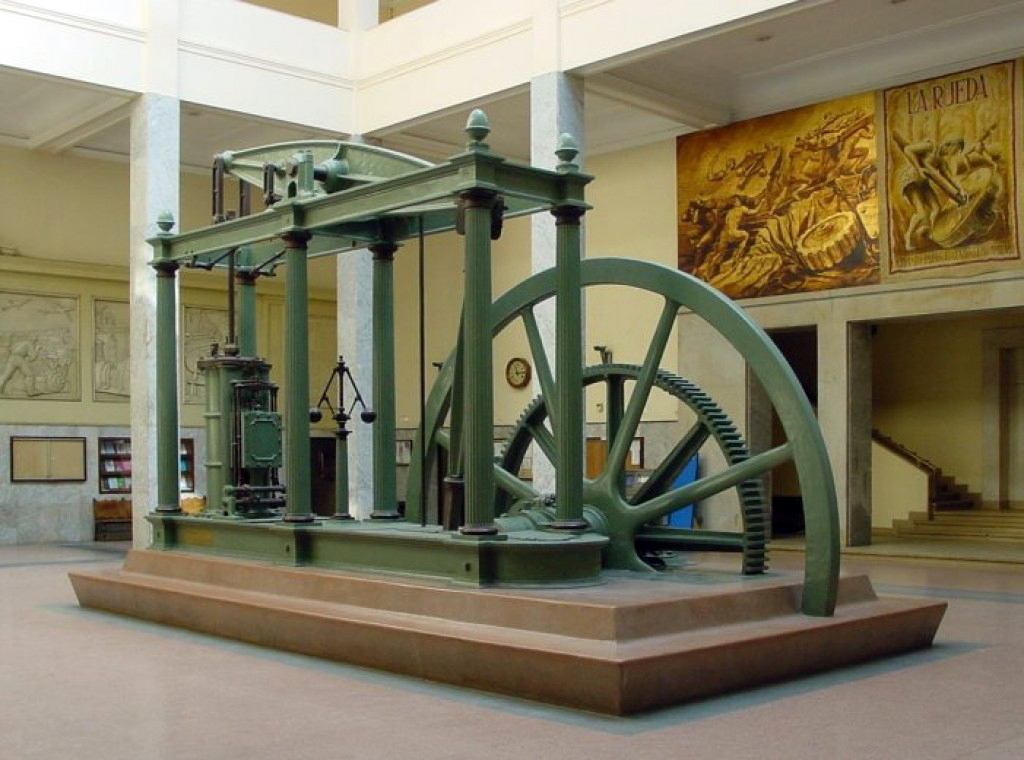
A Watt steam engine, the steam engine fuelled primarily by coal that propelled the Industrial Revolution in Great Britain and the world.

Rapid economic growth following the Napoleonic Wars was the continuing product of the ever-expanding Industrial Revolution. The revolution began in Britain, where Thomas Newcomen developed a steam engine in 1712 to pump seeping water out of mines. This engine at first was powered by water, but soon coal and wood were heavily used. The British first learned to use steam power effectively. In 1804, the first steam powered railroad locomotive was developed in Britain, which allowed goods and people to be transported at faster speeds than ever before in history. Soon, large numbers of goods were being produced in factories. This resulted in great societal changes, and many people settled in the cities where the factories were located. Factory work could often be brutal.

With no safety regulations, people became sick from contaminants in the air in textile mills for, example. Many workers were also horribly maimed by dangerous factory machinery. Since workers relied only on their small wages for sustenance, entire families were forced to work, including children. These and other problems caused by industrialism resulted in some reforms by the mid-19th century. The economic model of the West also began to change, with mercantilism being replaced by capitalism, in which companies, and later, large corporations, were run by individual investors.

New ideological movements began as a result of the Industrial Revolution, including the Luddite movement, which opposed machinery, feeling it did not benefit the common good, and the socialists, whose beliefs usually included the elimination of private property and the sharing of industrial wealth. Unions were founded among industrial workers to help secure better wages and rights. Another result of the revolution was a change in societal hierarchy, especially in Europe, where nobility still occupied a high level on the social ladder. Capitalists emerged as a new powerful group, with educated professionals like doctors and lawyers under them, and the various industrial workers at the bottom. These changes were often slow however, with Western society as a whole remaining primarily agricultural for decades.

=== Great Britain: 1815–1870 ===
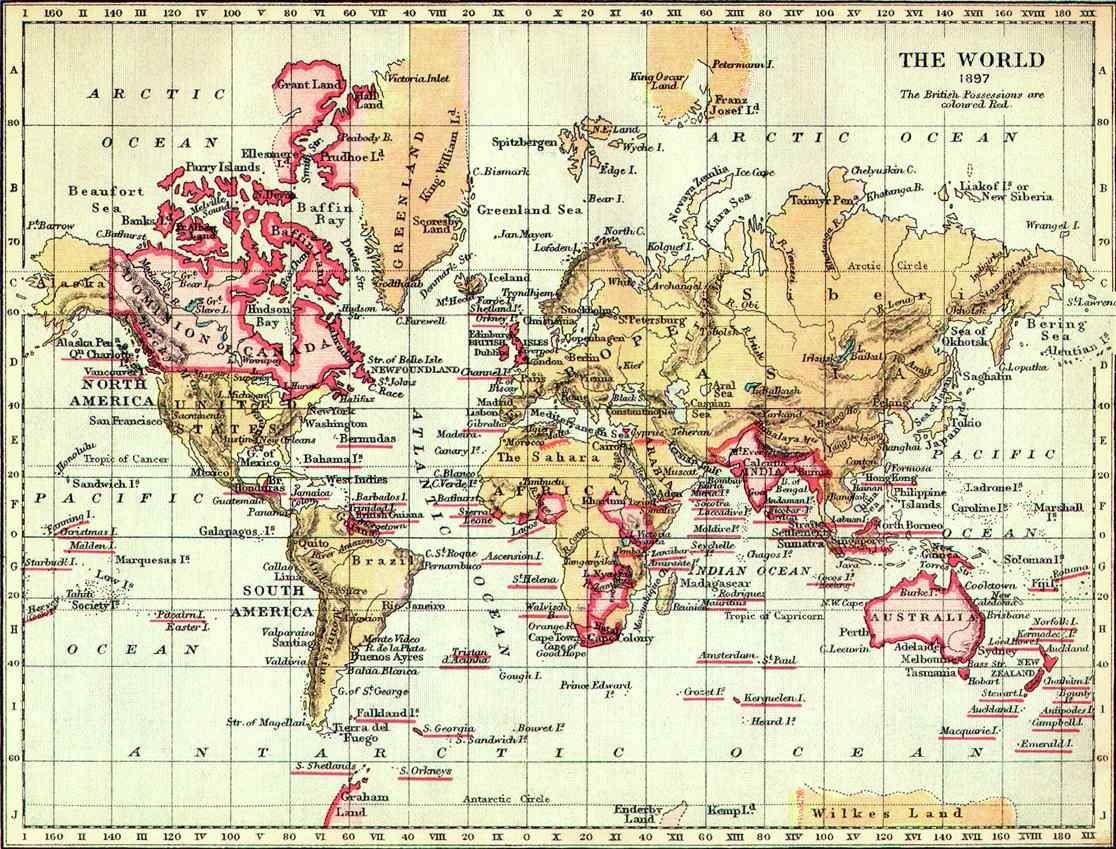
The British Empire in 1897

From 1837 until 1901, Queen Victoria reigned over Great Britain and the ever-expanding British Empire. The Industrial Revolution accelerated, making Britain the most powerful nation. It enjoyed relative peace and stability from 1815 until 1914, this period is often called the Pax Britannica, from the Latin "British Peace". The monarch became more a figurehead and symbol of national identity; actual power was in the hands of the prime minister and the cabinet, and was based on a majority in the House of Commons. Two rival parties were the Conservative Party and the Liberal Party. The Liberal constituency was made up mostly of businessmen, as many Liberals supported the idea of a free market. Conservatives were supported by the aristocracy and gentry landowners. Control of Parliament switched back and forth between the parties. Overall, it was a period of reform.

In 1832 more representation was granted to new industrial cities, and laws barring Catholics from serving in Parliament were repealed, although discrimination against Catholics, especially Irish Catholics, continued. Other reforms granted near universal manhood suffrage, and state-supported elementary education for all Britons. More rights were granted to workers as well.

Ireland had been ruled from London since the Middle Ages. After the Protestant Reformation the British Establishment began a campaign of discrimination against Roman Catholic and Presbyterian Irish, who lacked many rights under the Penal Laws, and the majority of the agricultural land was owned by the Protestant Ascendancy. Great Britain and Ireland had become a single nation ruled from London without the autonomous Parliament of Ireland after the Act of Union of 1800 was passed, creating the United Kingdom of Great Britain and Ireland. In the mid-19th century, Ireland suffered a devastating famine, which killed 10% of the population and led to massive emigration: see Irish diaspora.

==== British Empire: 1815–1870 ====
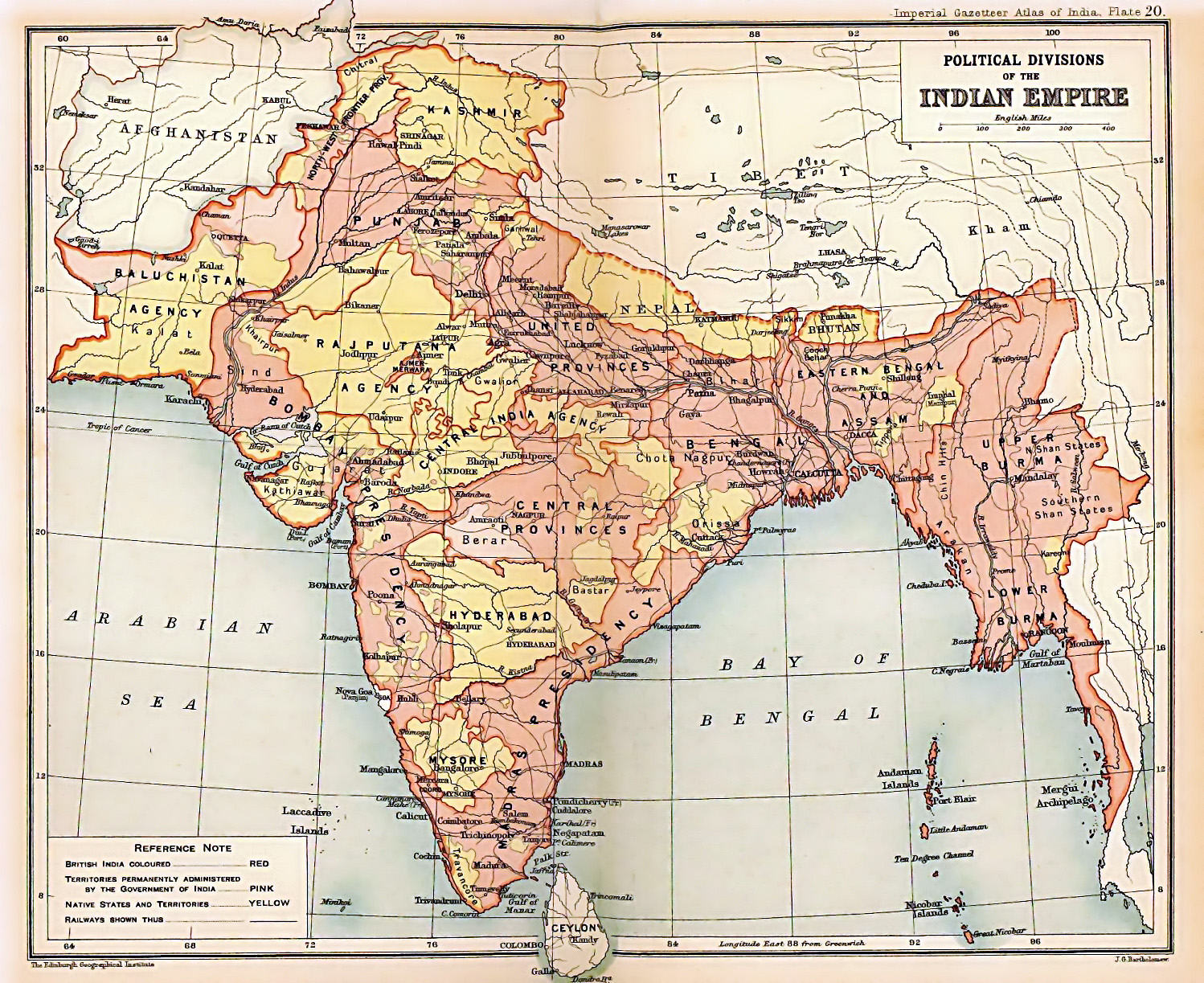
The British Raj

Throughout the 19th century, Britain's power grew enormously and the sun quite literally "never set" on the British Empire, for it had outposts on every occupied continent. It consolidated control over such far flung territories as Canada and Jamaica in the Americas, Australia and New Zealand in Oceania; Malaya, Hong Kong and Singapore in the Far East and a line of colonial possessions from Egypt to the Cape of Good Hope through Africa. All of India was under British rule by 1858.

In 1804, the Shah of the declining Mughal Empire had formally accepted the protection of the British East India Company. Many Britons settled in India, establishing a rich ruling class. They then expanded into neighbouring Burma. Among the British born in India were the immensely influential writers Rudyard Kipling (1865) and George Orwell (1903).

In the Far East, Britain went to war with the declining Qing dynasty of China when it tried to stop British merchants in China from selling the opium to the Chinese public. The First Opium War (1840–1842), ended in a British victory, and China was forced to remove barriers to British trade and cede several ports and the island of Hong Kong to Britain. Soon, other powers sought these same privileges with China and China was forced to agree, ending Chinese isolation from the rest of the world. In 1853 an American expedition opened up Japan to trade with first the U.S., and then the rest of the world.

In 1833, Britain ended slavery by buying out all the owners throughout its empire after a successful campaign by abolitionists. Furthermore, Britain had a great deal of success attempting to get other powers to outlaw the practice as well.

As British settlement of southern Africa continued, the descendants of the Dutch in southern Africa, called the Boers or Afrikaners, whom Britain had ruled since the Anglo-Dutch Wars, migrated northward, disliking British rule. Explorers and missionaries like David Livingstone became national heroes. Cecil Rhodes founded Rhodesia and a British army under Lord Kitchener secured control of Sudan in the 1898 Battle of Omdurman.

==== Canada: 1815–1870 ====
Historical territorial expansion of Canada

Following the American Revolution, many Loyalists to Britain fled north to what is today Canada (where they were called United Empire Loyalists). Joined by mostly British colonists, they helped establish early colonies like Ontario and New Brunswick. British settlement in North America increased, and soon there were several colonies both north and west of the early ones in the northeast of the continent, these new ones included British Columbia and Prince Edward Island.

Rebellions broke out against British rule in 1837, but Britain appeased the rebels' supporters in 1867 by confederating the colonies into Canada, with its own prime minister. Although Canada was still firmly within the British Empire, its people now enjoyed a great degree of self-rule. Canada was unique in the British Empire in that it had a French-speaking province, Quebec, which Britain had gained rule over in the Seven Years' War.

==== Australia and New Zealand: 1815–1870 ====
Territorial expansion of Australia.

The First Fleet of British convicts arrived at New South Wales, Australia in 1788 and established a British outpost and penal colony at Sydney Cove. These convicts were often petty 'criminals', and represented the population spill-over of Britain's Industrial Revolution, as a result of the rapid urbanisation and dire crowding of British cities. Other convicts were political dissidents, particularly from Ireland. The establishment of a wool industry and the enlightened governorship of Lachlan Macquarie were instrumental in transforming New South Wales from a notorious prison outpost into a budding civil society. Further colonies were established around the perimeter of the continent and European explorers ventured deep inland. A free colony was established at South Australia in 1836 with a vision for a province of the British Empire with political and religious freedoms. The colony became a cradle of democratic reform. The Australian gold rushes increased prosperity and cultural diversity and autonomous democratic parliaments began to be established from the 1850s onward.

The native inhabitants of Australia, called the Aborigines, lived as hunter-gatherers before European arrival. The population, never large, was largely dispossessed without treaty agreements nor compensations through the 19th century by the expansion of European agriculture, and, as had occurred when Europeans arrived in North and South America, faced superior European weaponry and suffered greatly from exposure to Old World diseases such as smallpox, to which they had no biological immunity.

From the early 19th century, New Zealand was being visited by European explorers, sailors, missionaries, traders and adventurers (known as Pākehā) and was administered by Britain from the nearby colony of New South Wales. In 1840 Britain signed the Treaty of Waitangi with the natives of New Zealand, the Māori, in which Britain gained sovereignty over the archipelago. As more European settlers arrived, clashes resulted and the New Zealand colonial government fought several wars before defeating the Māori. By 1870, New Zealand had a population made up mostly of European descent.

=== United States: 1815–1870 ===
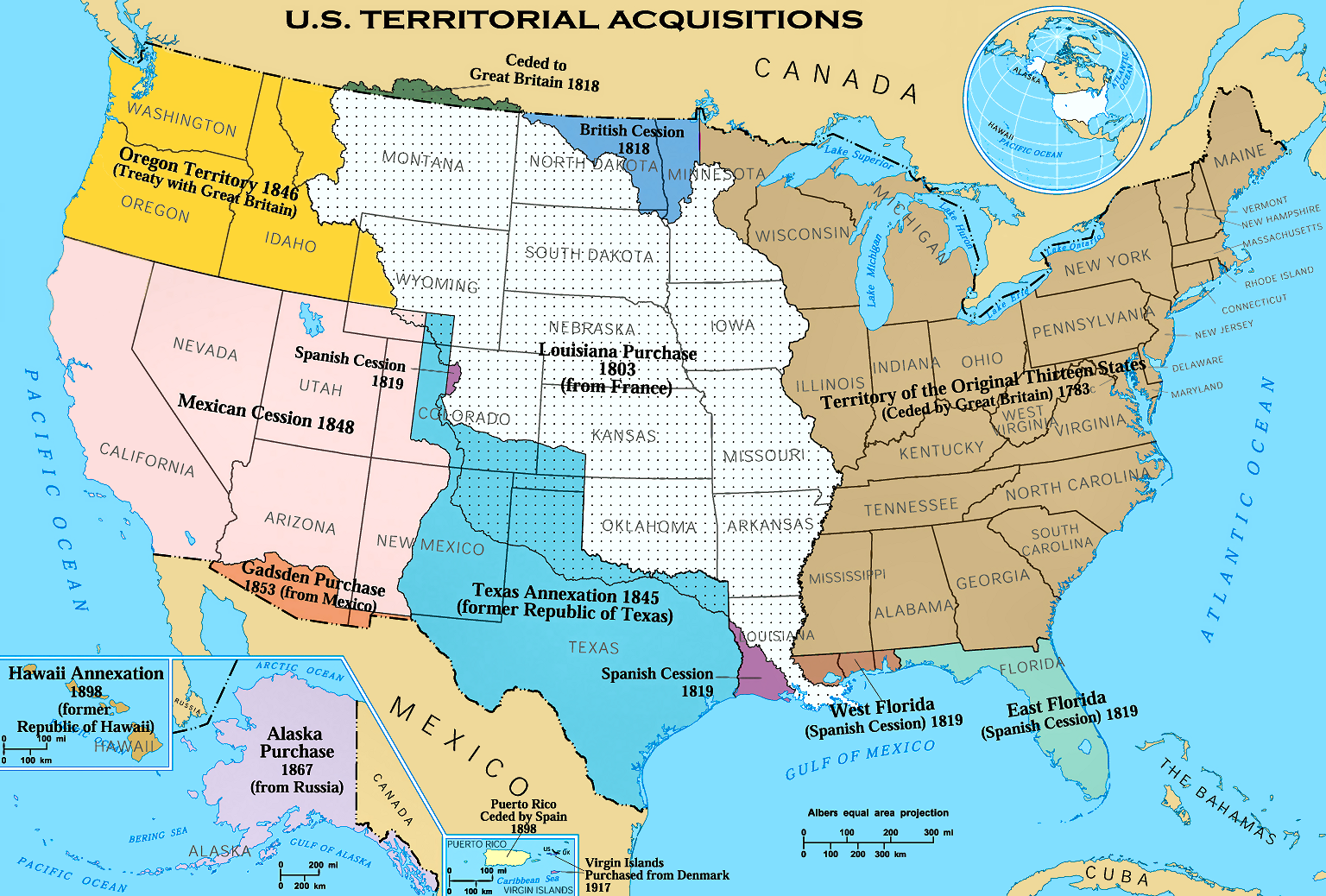
Historical territorial expansion of the United States

President Abraham Lincoln

Following independence from Britain, the United States began expanding westward, and soon a number of new states had joined the union. In 1803, the United States purchased the Louisiana Territory from France, whose emperor, Napoleon I, had regained it from Spain. Soon, America's growing population was settling the Louisiana Territory, which geographically doubled the size of the country. At the same time, a series of revolutions and independence movements in Spain and Portugal's American empires resulted in the liberation of nearly all of Latin America, as the region composed of South America, most of the Caribbean, and North America from Mexico south became known. At first Spain and its allies seemed ready to try to reconquer the colonies, but the U.S. and Britain opposed this, and the reconquest never took place. From 1821 on, the U.S. bordered the newly independent nation of Mexico. An early problem faced by the Mexican republic was what to do with its sparsely populated northern territories, which today make up a large part of the American West. The government decided to try to attract Americans looking for land. Americans arrived in such large numbers that both the provinces of Texas and California had majority white, English-speaking populations.

This led to a culture clash between these provinces and the rest of Mexico. When Mexico became a dictatorship under General Antonio López de Santa Anna, the Texans declared independence. After several battles, Texas gained independence from Mexico, although Mexico later claimed it still had a right to Texas. After existing as a republic modeled after the U.S. for several years, Texas joined the United States in 1845. This led to border disputes between the U.S. and Mexico, resulting in the Mexican–American War. The war ended with an American victory, and Mexico had to cede all its northern territories to the United States, and recognize the independence of California, which had revolted against Mexico during the war. In 1850, California joined the United States. In 1848, the U.S. and Britain resolved a border dispute over territory on the Pacific coast, called the Oregon Country by giving Britain the northern part and the U.S. the southern part. In 1867, the U.S. expanded again, purchasing the Russian colony of Alaska, in northwestern North America.

Politically, the U.S. became more democratic with the abolishment of property requirements in voting, although voting remained restricted to white males. By the mid-19th century, the most important issue was slavery. The Northern states generally had outlawed the practice, while the Southern states not only had kept it legal but came to feel it was essential to their way of life. As new states joined the union, lawmakers clashed over whether they should be slave states or free states. In 1860, the anti-slavery candidate Abraham Lincoln was elected president. Fearing he would try to outlaw slavery in the whole country, several southern states seceded, forming the Confederate States of America, electing their own president and raising their own army. Lincoln countered that secession was illegal and raised an army to crush the rebel government, thus the advent of the American Civil War (1861–65).

The Confederates had a skilled military that even succeeded in invading the northern state of Pennsylvania. However, the war began to turn around, with the defeat of Confederates at Gettysburg, Pennsylvania, and at Vicksburg, which gave the Union control of the important Mississippi River. Union forces invaded deep into the South, and the Confederacy's greatest general, Robert E. Lee, surrendered to Ulysses S. Grant of the Union in 1865. After that, the south came under Union occupation, ending the American Civil War. Lincoln was tragically assassinated in 1865, but his dream of ending slavery, exhibited in the wartime Emancipation Proclamation, was carried out by his Republican Party, which outlawed slavery, granted blacks equality and black males voting rights via constitutional amendments. However, although the abolishment of slavery would not be challenged, equal treatment for blacks would be.

The Gettysburg Address, Lincoln's most famous speech and one of the most quoted political speeches in United States history, was delivered at the dedication of the Soldiers' National Cemetery in Gettysburg, Pennsylvania on 19 November 1863, during the Civil War, four and a half months after the Battle of Gettysburg. Describing America as a "nation conceived in Liberty and dedicated to the proposition that all men are created equal", Lincoln famously called on those gathered:

[We here] highly resolve that these dead shall not have died in vain; that this nation, under God, shall have a new birth of freedom; and that government of the people, by the people, for the people, shall not perish from the earth.

== Continental Europe: 1815–1870 ==
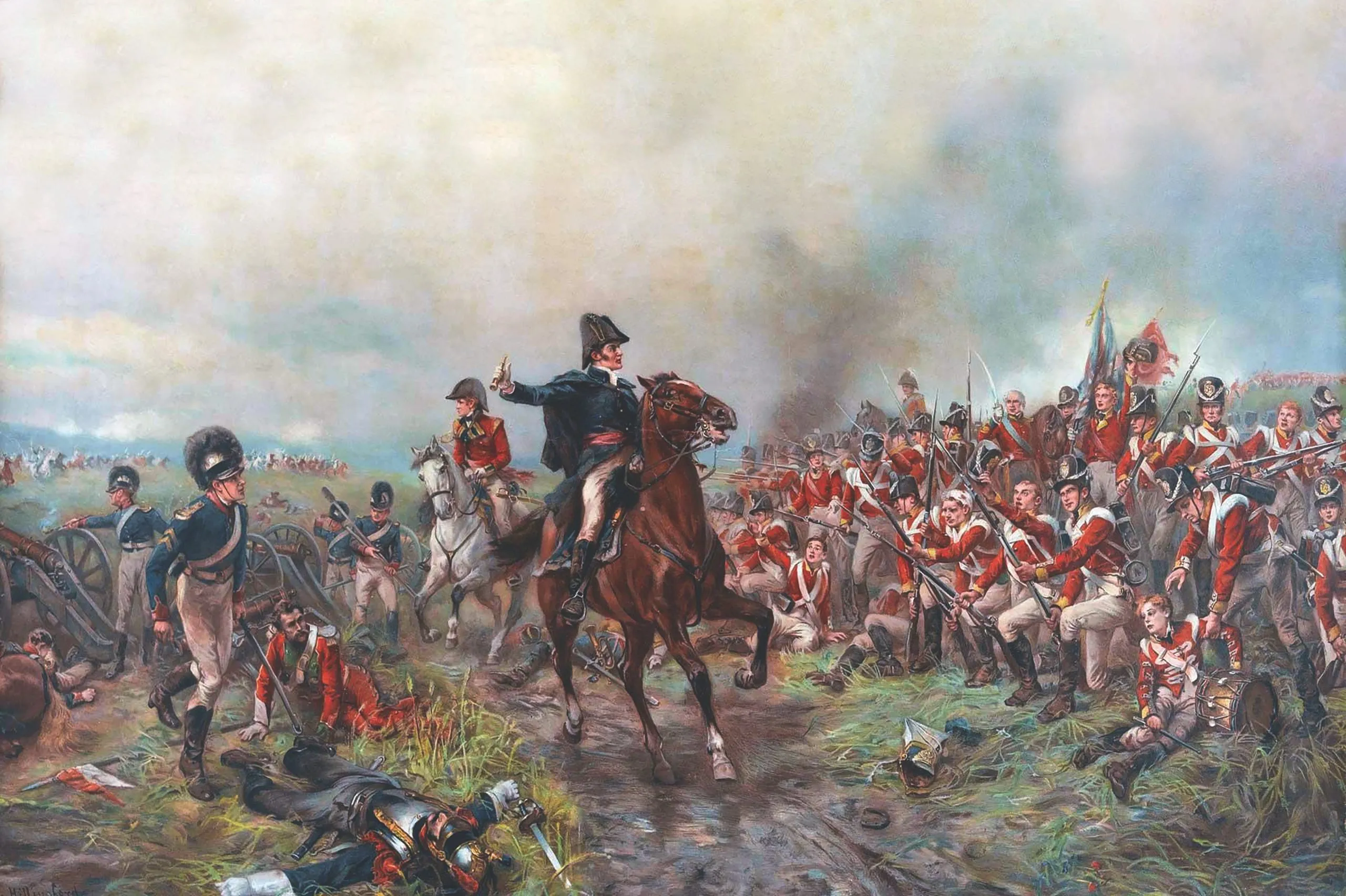
The Duke of Wellington at the Battle of Waterloo, the battle which brought an end to the Napoleonic Wars

The years following the Napoleonic Wars were a time of change in Europe. The Industrial Revolution, nationalism, and several political revolutions transformed the continent.

Industrial technology was imported from Britain. The first lands affected by this were France, the Low Countries, and western Germany. Eventually the Industrial Revolution spread to other parts of Europe. Many people in the countryside migrated to major cities like Paris, Berlin, and Amsterdam, which were connected like never before by railroads. Europe soon had its own class of wealthy industrialists, and large numbers of industrial workers. New ideologies emerged as a reaction against perceived abuses of industrial society. Among these ideologies were socialism and the more radical communism, created by the German Karl Marx. According to communism, history was a series of class struggles, and at the time industrial workers were pitted against their employers. Inevitably the workers would rise up in a worldwide revolution and abolish private property, according to Marx. Communism was also atheistic, since, according to Marx, religion was simply a tool used by the dominant class to keep the oppressed class docile.

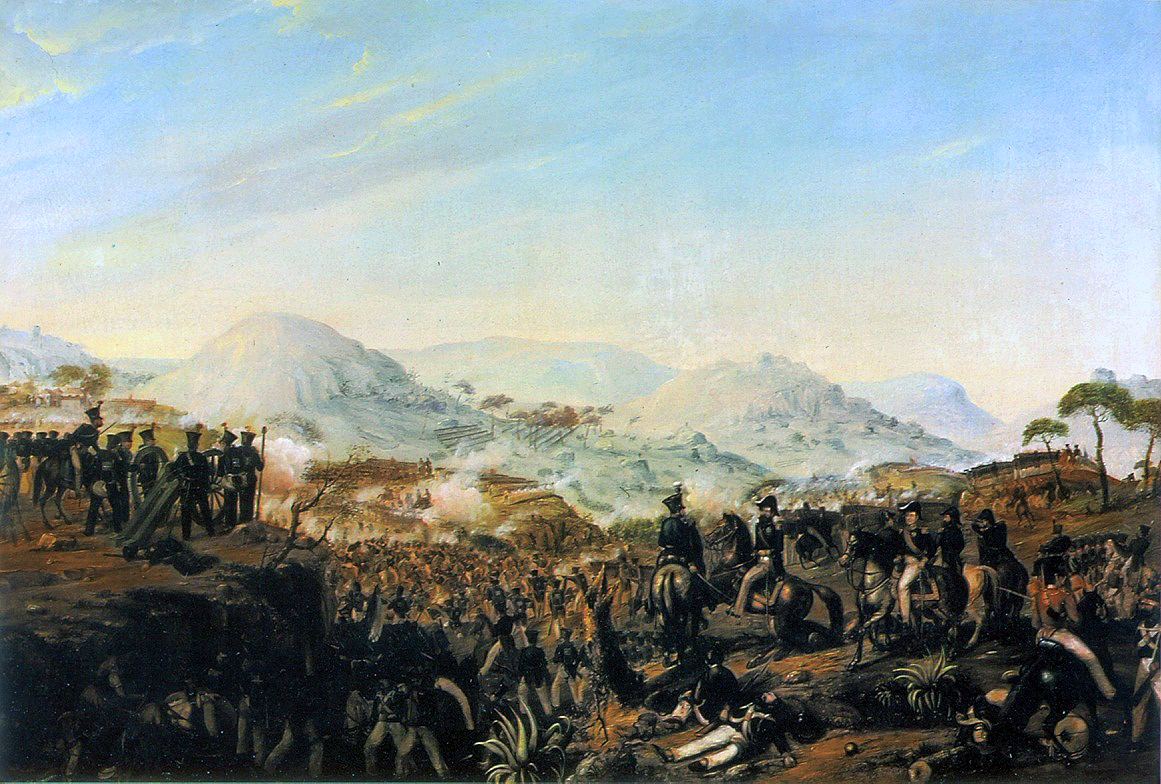
After the Napoleonic Wars, many years of turmoil took Portugal, which built up to colonial decline and the Liberal Wars.

Several revolutions occurred in Europe following the Napoleonic Wars. The goal of most of these revolutions was to establish some form of democracy in a particular nation. Many were successful for a time, but their effects were often eventually reversed. Examples of this occurred in Spain, Italy, and Austria. Several European nations stood steadfastly against revolution and democracy, including Austria and Russia.

Two successful revolts of the era were the Greek and Serbian wars of independence, which freed those nations from Ottoman rule. Another successful revolution occurred in the Low Countries. After the Napoleonic Wars, the Netherlands was given control of modern-day Belgium, which had been part of the Holy Roman Empire. The Dutch found it hard to rule the Belgians, due to their Catholic religion and French language. In the 1830s, the Belgians successfully overthrew Dutch rule, establishing the Kingdom of Belgium.

In 1848 a series of revolutions occurred in Prussia, Austria, and France. In France, the king, Louis-Philippe, was overthrown and a republic was declared. Louis Napoleon, nephew of Napoleon I was elected the republic's first president. Extremely popular, Napoleon was made Napoleon III (since Napoleon I's son had been crowned Napoleon II during his reign), Emperor of the French, by a vote of the French people, ending France's Second Republic. Revolutionaries in Prussia and Italy focused more on nationalism, and most advocated the establishment of unified German and Italian states, respectively.

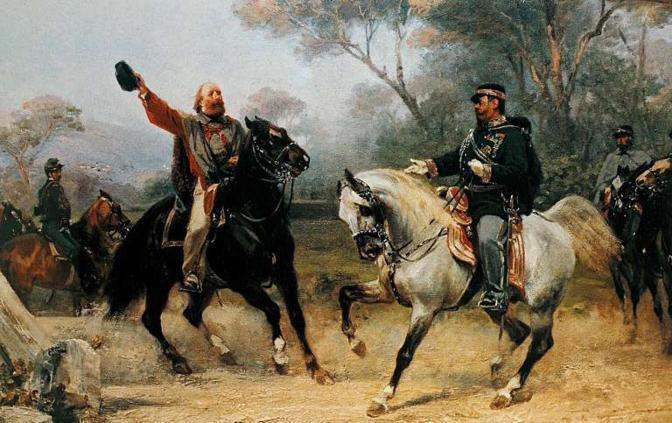
Victor Emmanuel II meets Garibaldi near Teano. The Italian Risorgimento saw Italy unite as one kingdom.

In the city-states of Italy, many argued for a unification of all the Italian kingdoms into a single nation. Obstacles to this included the many Italian dialects spoken by the people of Italy, and the Austrian presence in the north of the peninsula. Unification of the peninsula began in 1859.

The powerful Kingdom of Sardinia (also called Savoy or Piedmont) formed an alliance with France and went to war with Austria in that year. The war ended with a Sardinian victory, and Austrian forces left Italy. Plebiscites were held in several cities, and the majority of people voted for union with Sardinia, creating the Kingdom of Italy under Victor Emmanuel II. In 1860, the Italian nationalist Garibaldi led revolutionaries in an overthrow of the government of the Kingdom of the Two Sicilies. A plebiscite held there resulted in a unification of that kingdom with Italy. Italian forces seized the eastern Papal States in 1861.

In 1866 Venetia became part of Italy after Italy's ally, Prussia, defeated that kingdom's rulers, the Austrians, in the Austro-Prussian War. In 1870, Italian troops conquered the Papal States, completing unification. Pope Pius IX refused to recognize the Italian government or negotiate settlement for the loss of Church land.

Prussia in the middle and late parts of the 19th century was ruled by its king, Wilhelm I, and its skilled chancellor, Otto von Bismarck. In 1864, Prussia went to war with Denmark and gained several German-speaking lands as a result. In 1866, Prussia went to war with the Austrian Empire and won, and created a confederation of it and several German states, called the North German Confederation, setting the stage for the 1871 formation of the German Empire.

After years of dealing with Hungarian revolutionaries, whose kingdom Austria had conquered centuries earlier, the Austrian emperor, Franz Joseph agreed to divide the empire into two parts: Austria and Hungary, and rule as both Emperor of Austria and king of Hungary. The new Austro-Hungarian Empire was created in 1867. The two peoples were united in loyalty to the monarch and Catholicism.

There were changes throughout the West in science, religion and culture between 1815 and 1870. Europe in 1870 differed greatly from its state in 1815. Most Western European nations had some degree of democracy, and two new national states had been created, Italy and Germany. Political parties were formed throughout the continent and with the spread of industrialism, Europe's economy was transformed, although it remained very agricultural.

== Culture, arts and sciences: 1815–1914 ==
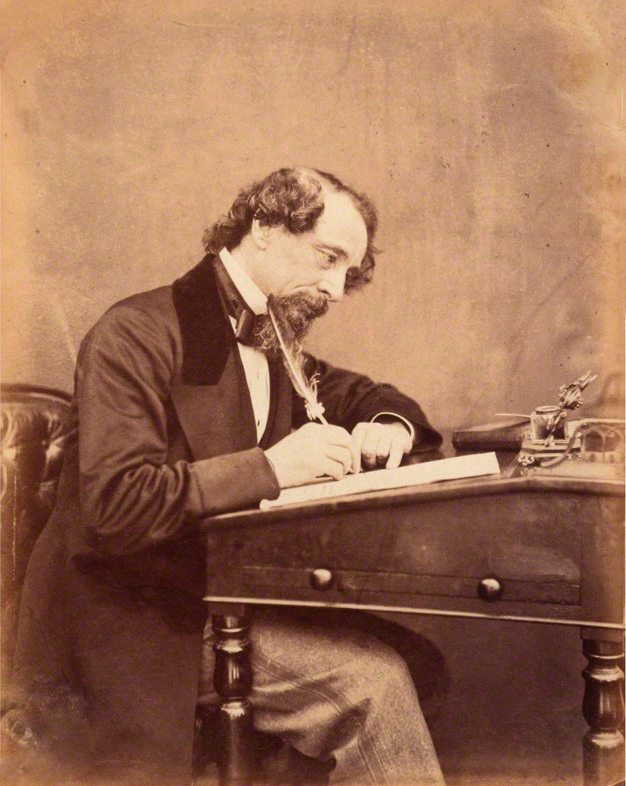
English writer Charles Dickens at his desk in 1858

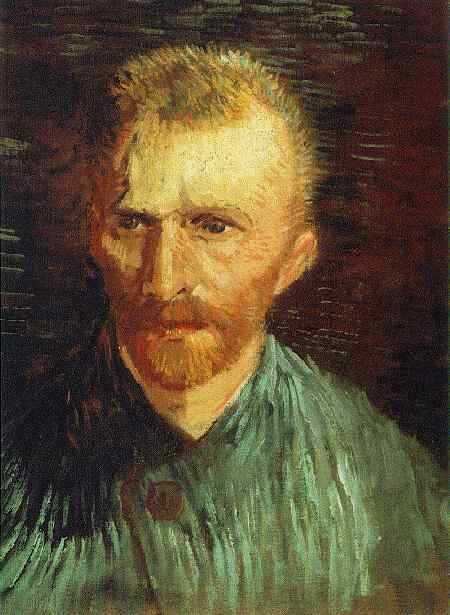
Self portrait by influential Dutch painter Vincent van Gogh.

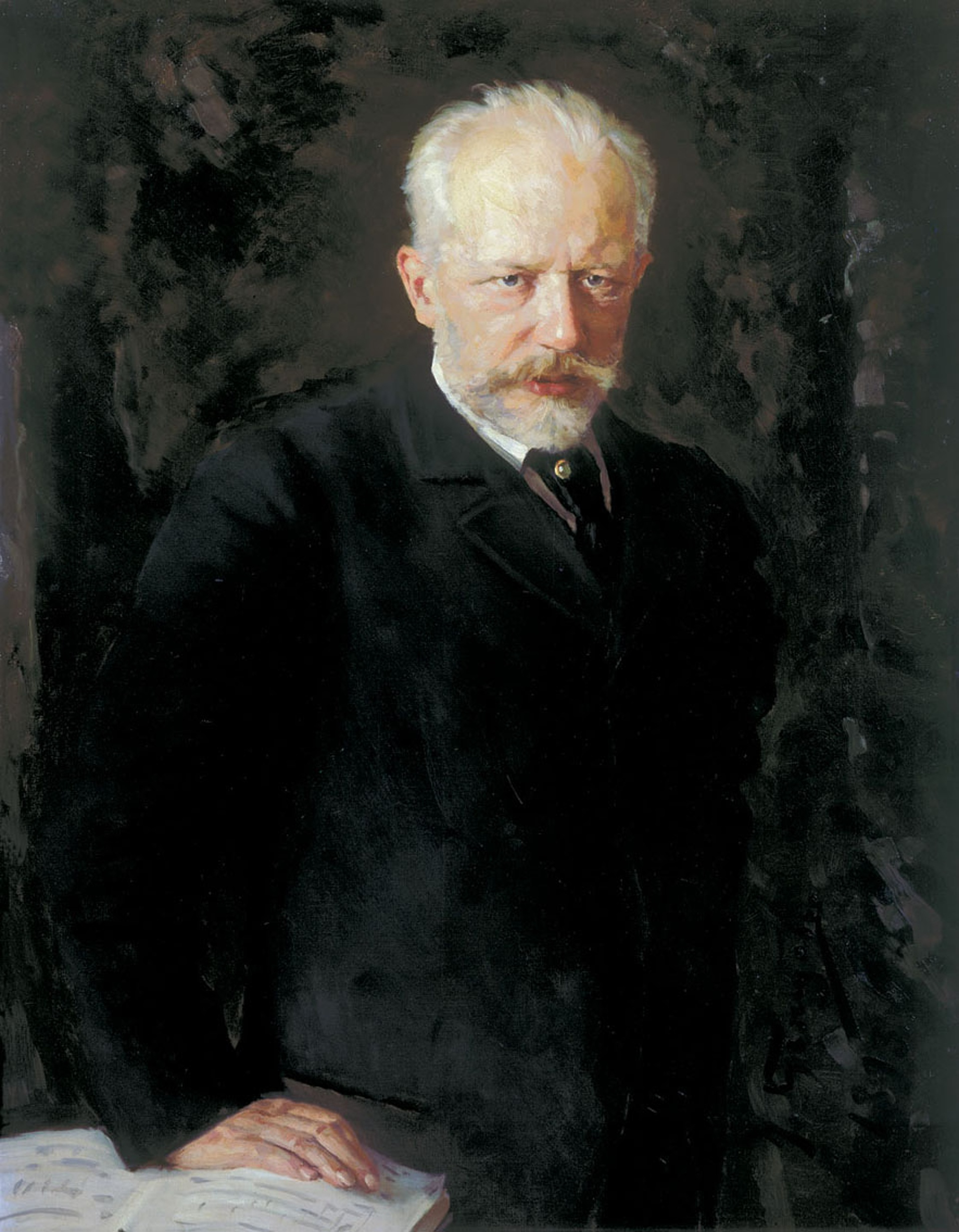
Russian composer Pyotr Tchaikovsky.

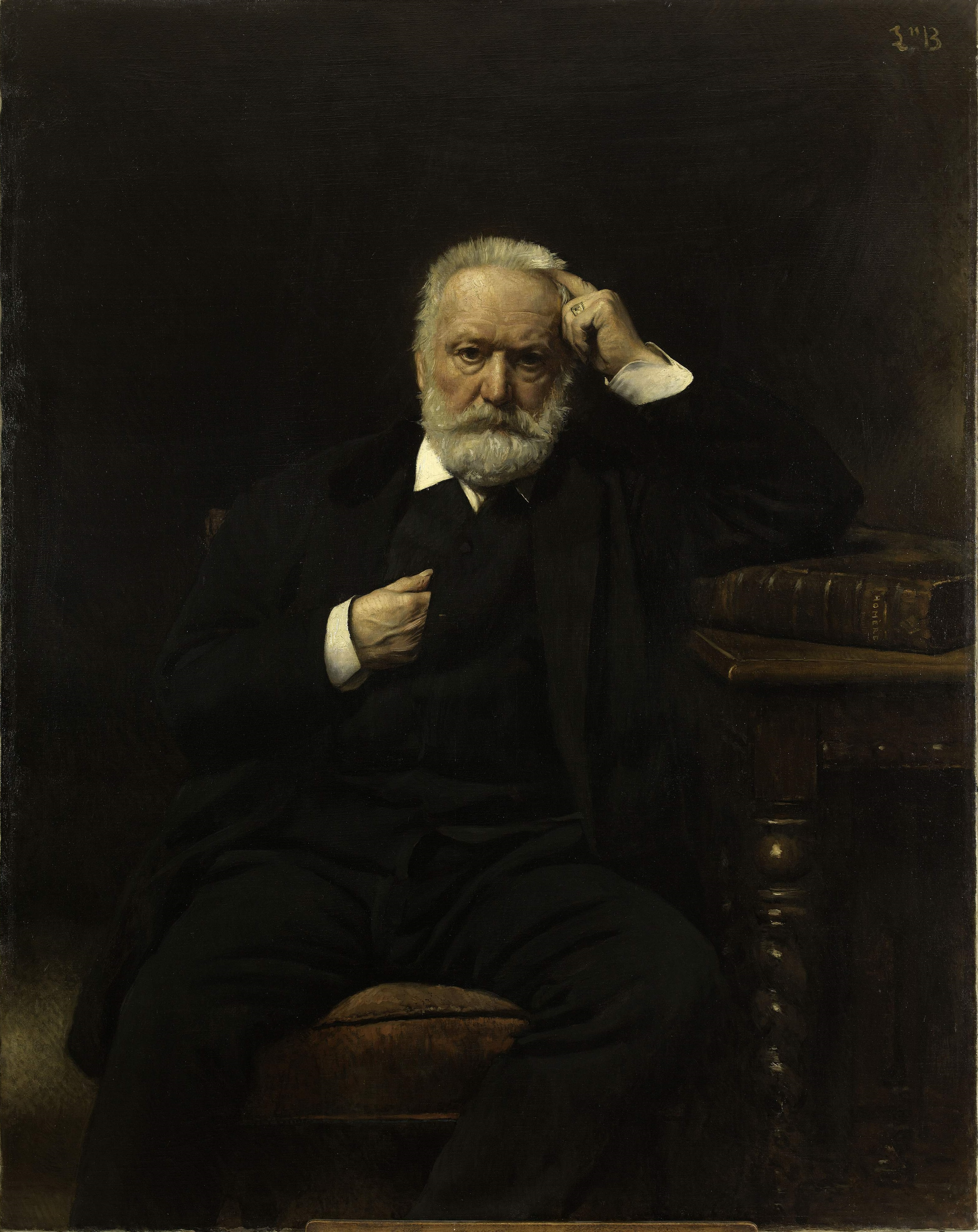
French writer Victor Hugo.

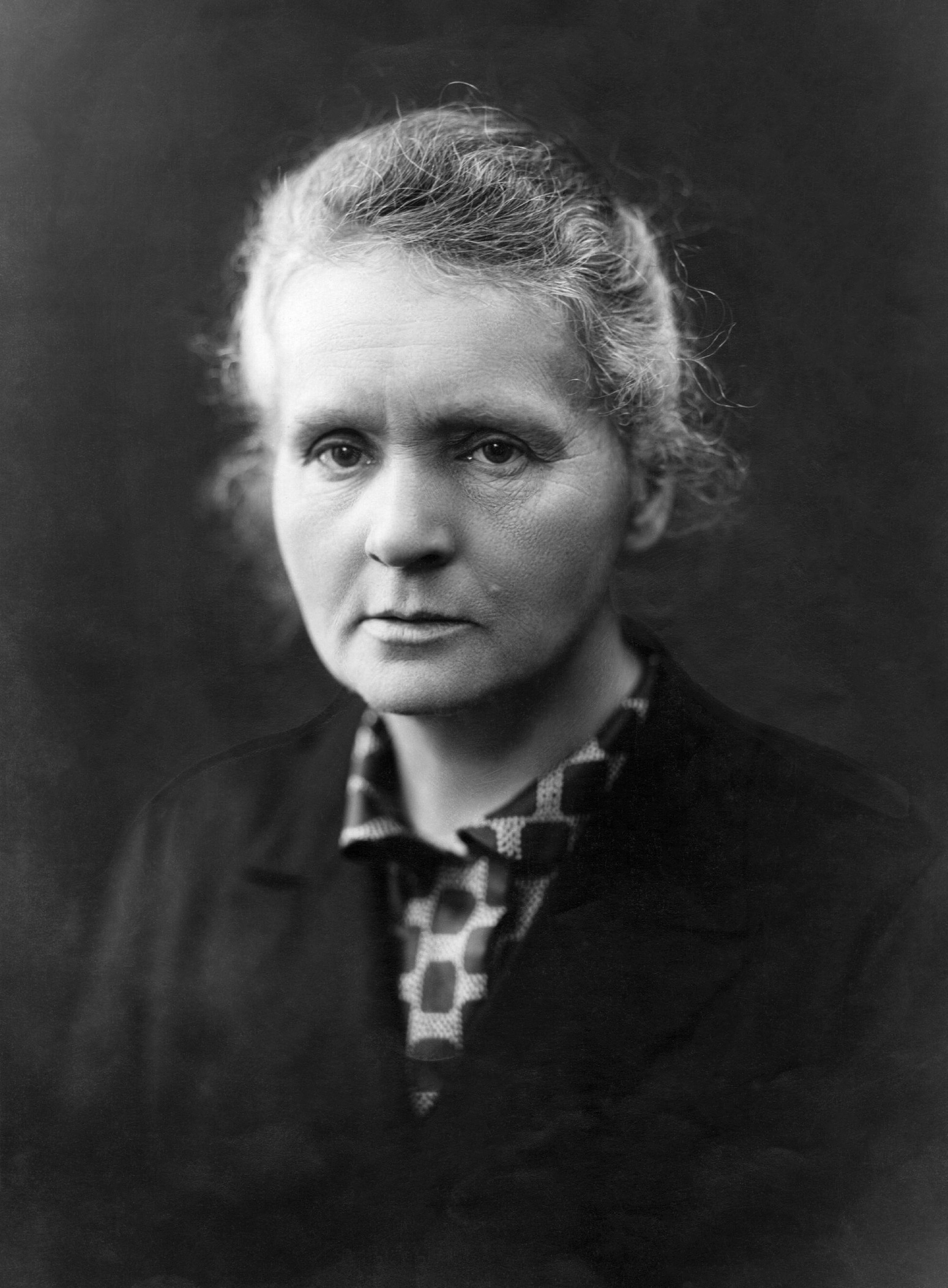
Polish–French physicist–chemist Marie Curie, famous for her pioneering research on radioactivity.

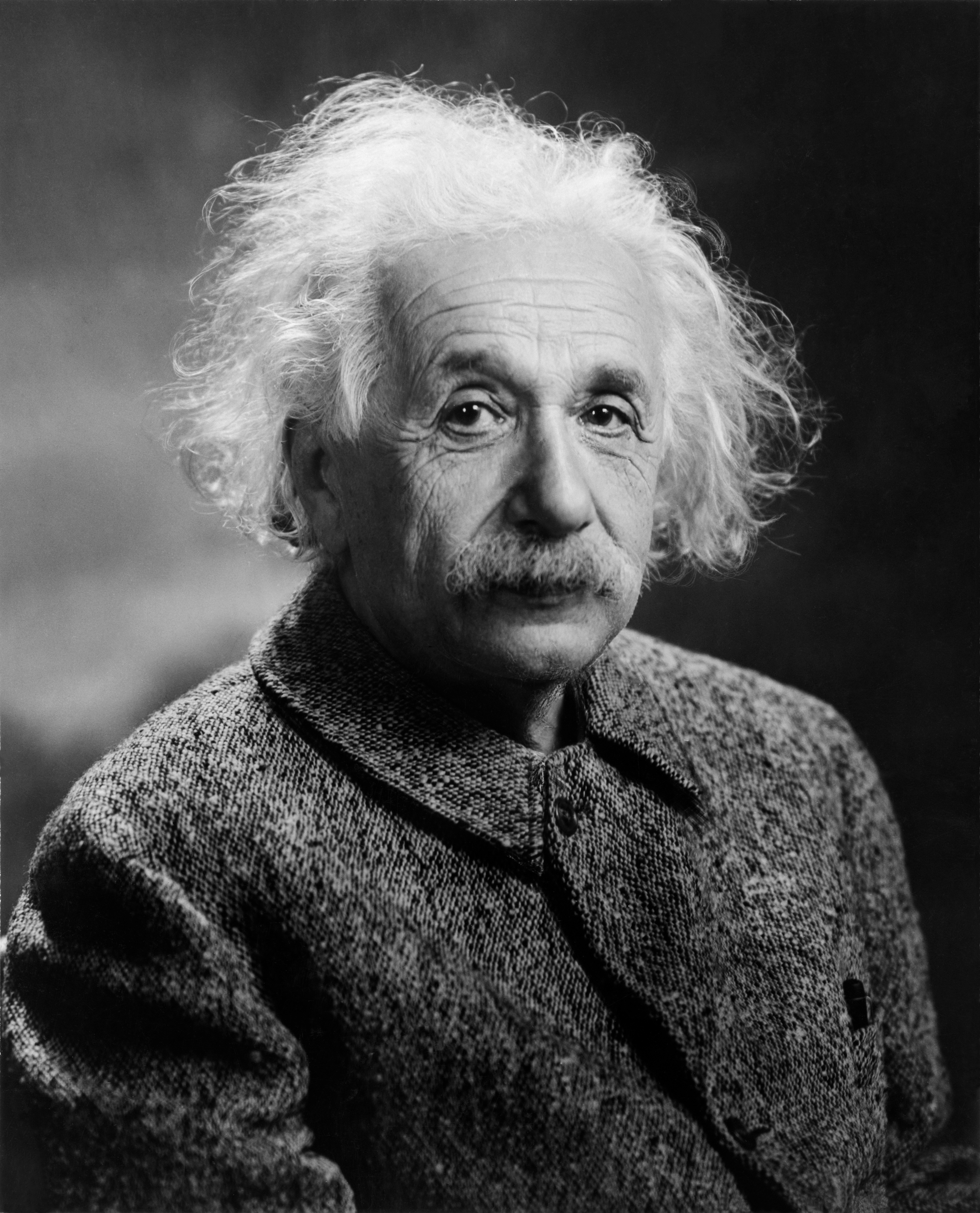
Albert Einstein, a key theoretical physicist in the 20th century who developed the theory of relativity and parts of early quantum theory

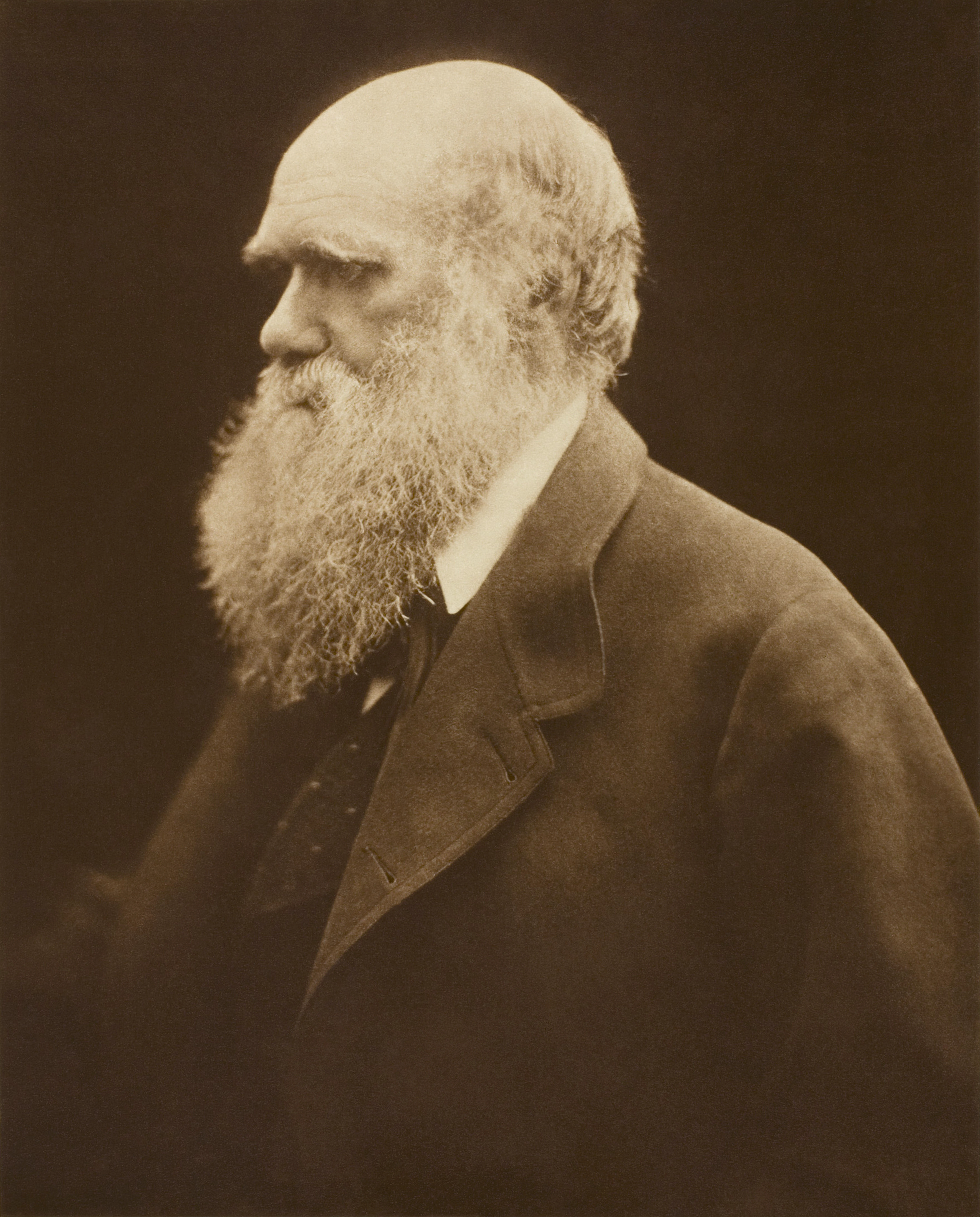
The British naturalist, Charles Darwin.

The 19th and early 20th centuries saw important contributions to the process of modernisation of Western art and Literature and the continuing evolution in the role of religion in Western societies.

Napoleon re-established the Catholic Church in France through the Concordat of 1801. The end of the Napoleonic Wars, signaled by the Congress of Vienna, brought Catholic revival and the return of the Papal States. In 1801, a new political entity was formed, the United Kingdom of Great Britain and Ireland, which merged the kingdoms of Great Britain and Ireland, thus increasing the number of Catholics in the new state. Pressure for abolition of anti-Catholic laws grew and in 1829 Parliament passed the Roman Catholic Relief Act 1829, giving Catholics almost equal civil rights, including the right to vote and to hold most public offices. While remaining a minority religion in the British Empire, a steady stream of new Catholics would continue to convert from the Church of England and Ireland, notably John Henry Newman and the poets Gerard Manley Hopkins and Oscar Wilde. The Anglo-Catholic movement began, emphasizing the Catholic traditions of the Anglican Church. New churches like the Methodist, Unitarian, and LDS Churches were founded. Many Westerners became less religious in this period, although a majority of people still held traditional Christian beliefs.

The 1859 publication of On the Origin of Species, by the English naturalist Charles Darwin, provided an alternative hypothesis for the development, diversification, and design of human life to the traditional poetic scriptural explanation known as Creationism. According to Darwin, only the organisms most able to adapt to their environment survived while others became extinct. Adaptations resulted in changes in certain populations of organisms which could eventually cause the creation of new species. Modern genetics started with Gregor Johann Mendel, a German-Czech Augustinian monk who studied the nature of inheritance in plants. In his 1865 paper "Versuche über Pflanzenhybriden" ("Experiments on Plant Hybridization"), Mendel traced the inheritance patterns of certain traits in pea plants and described them mathematically. Louis Pasteur and Joseph Lister made discoveries about bacteria and its effects on humans. Geologists at the time made discoveries indicating the world was far older than most believed it to be. Early batteries were invented and a telegraph system was also invented, allowing global communication.

In 1869 Russian chemist Dmitri Mendeleev published his Periodic table. The success of Mendeleev's table came from two decisions he made: The first was to leave gaps in the table when it seemed that the corresponding element had not yet been discovered. The second decision was to occasionally ignore the order suggested by the atomic weights and switch adjacent elements, such as cobalt and nickel, to better classify them into chemical families. At the end of the 19th century, a number of discoveries were made in physics which paved the way for the development of modern physics – including Maria Skłodowska-Curie's work on radioactivity.

In Europe by the 19th century, fashion had shifted away from such artistic styles as Mannerism, Baroque and Rococo and sought to revert to the earlier, simpler art of the Renaissance by creating Neoclassicism. Neoclassicism complemented the intellectual movement known as the Enlightenment, which was similarly idealistic. Ingres, Canova, and Jacques-Louis David are among the best-known neoclassicists.

Just as Mannerism rejected Classicism, so did Romanticism reject the ideas of the Enlightenment and the aesthetic of the Neoclassicists. Romanticism emphasized emotion and nature, and idealized the Middle Ages. Important musicians were Franz Schubert, Pyotr Tchaikovsky, Richard Wagner, Fryderyk Chopin, and John Constable. Romantic art focused on the use of color and motion in order to portray emotion, but like classicism used Greek and Roman mythology and tradition as an important source of symbolism. Another important aspect of Romanticism was its emphasis on nature and portraying the power and beauty of the natural world. Romanticism was also a large literary movement, especially in poetry. Among the greatest Romantic artists were Eugène Delacroix, Francisco Goya, Karl Bryullov, J. M. W. Turner, John Constable, Caspar David Friedrich, Ivan Aivazovsky, Thomas Cole, and William Blake. Romantic poetry emerged as a significant genre, particularly during the Victorian Era with leading exponents including William Wordsworth, Samuel Taylor Coleridge, Robert Burns, Edgar Allan Poe and John Keats. Other Romantic writers included Sir Walter Scott, Lord Byron, Alexander Pushkin, Victor Hugo, and Goethe.

Some of the best regarded poets of the era were women. Mary Wollstonecraft had written one of the first works of feminist philosophy, A Vindication of the Rights of Woman which called for equal education for women in 1792 and her daughter, Mary Shelley became an accomplished author best known for her 1818 novel Frankenstein, which examined some of the frightening potential of the rapid advances of science.

In early 19th-century Europe, in response to industrialization, the movement of Realism emerged. Realism sought to accurately portray the conditions and hardships of the poor in the hopes of changing society. In contrast with Romanticism, which was essentially optimistic about mankind, Realism offered a stark vision of poverty and despair. Similarly, while Romanticism glorified nature, Realism portrayed life in the depths of an urban wasteland. Like Romanticism, Realism was a literary as well as an artistic movement. The great Realist painters include Jean-Baptiste-Siméon Chardin, Gustave Courbet, Jean-François Millet, Camille Corot, Honoré Daumier, Édouard Manet, Edgar Degas (both considered as Impressionists), Ilya Repin, and Thomas Eakins, among others.

Writers also sought to come to terms with the new industrial age. The works of the Englishman Charles Dickens (including his novels Oliver Twist and A Christmas Carol) and the Frenchman Victor Hugo (including Les Misérables) remain among the best known and widely influential. The first great Russian novelist was Nikolai Gogol (Dead Souls). Then came Ivan Goncharov, Nikolai Leskov and Ivan Turgenev. Leo Tolstoy (War and Peace, Anna Karenina) and Fyodor Dostoevsky (Crime and Punishment, The Idiot, The Brothers Karamazov) soon became internationally renowned to the point that many scholars such as F. R. Leavis have described one or the other as the greatest novelist ever. In the second half of the century Anton Chekhov excelled in writing short stories and became perhaps the leading dramatist internationally of his period. American literature also progressed with the development of a distinct voice: Mark Twain produced his masterpieces Tom Sawyer and Adventures of Huckleberry Finn. In Irish literature, the Anglo-Irish tradition produced Bram Stoker and Oscar Wilde writing in English and a Gaelic Revival had emerged by the end of the 19th century. The poetry of William Butler Yeats prefigured the emergence of the 20th-century Irish literary giants James Joyce, Samuel Beckett and Patrick Kavanagh. In Britain's Australian colonies, bush balladeers such as Henry Lawson and Banjo Paterson brought the character of a new continent to the pages of world literature.

The response of architecture to industrialisation, in stark contrast to the other arts, was to veer towards historicism. The railway stations built during this period are often called "the cathedrals of the age". Architecture during the Industrial Age witnessed revivals of styles from the distant past, such as the Gothic Revival—in which style the iconic Palace of Westminster in London was re-built to house the mother parliament of the British Empire. Notre Dame de Paris Cathedral in Paris was also restored in the Gothic style, following its desecration during the French Revolution.

Out of the naturalist ethic of Realism grew a major artistic movement, Impressionism. The Impressionists pioneered the use of light in painting as they attempted to capture light as seen from the human eye. Edgar Degas, Édouard Manet, Claude Monet, Camille Pissarro, and Pierre-Auguste Renoir, were all involved in the Impressionist movement. As a direct outgrowth of Impressionism came the development of Post-Impressionism. Paul Cézanne, Vincent van Gogh, Paul Gauguin, Georges Seurat are the best known Post-Impressionists. In Australia the Heidelberg School was expressing the light and colour of Australian landscape with a new insight and vigour.

The Industrial Revolution which began in Britain in the 18th century brought increased leisure time, leading to more time for citizens to attend and follow spectator sports, greater participation in athletic activities, and increased accessibility. The bat and ball sport of cricket was first played in England during the 16th century and was exported around the globe via the British Empire. A number of popular modern sports were devised or codified in Britain during the 19th century and obtained global prominence – these include Ping Pong, modern tennis, Association football, netball and rugby. The United States also developed popular international sports during this period. English migrants took antecedents of baseball to America during the colonial period. American football resulted from several major divergences from rugby, most notably the rule changes instituted by Walter Camp. Basketball was invented in 1891 by James Naismith, a Canadian physical education instructor working in Springfield, Massachusetts in the United States. Baron Pierre de Coubertin, a Frenchman, instigated the modern revival of the Olympic Games, with the first modern Olympics being held in Athens in 1896.

== New Imperialism: 1870–1914 ==
The years between 1870 and 1914 saw the expansion of Western power. By 1914, the Western and some Asian and Eurasian empires like the Empire of Japan, Russian Empire, Ottoman Empire, and Qing China dominated the entire planet. The major Western players in this New Imperialism were the United Kingdom, Russia, France, Germany, Italy, the Netherlands, Spain, Portugal, Belgium, Denmark, Sweden-Norway, and the United States. Japan was the only non-Western power involved in this new era of imperialism.

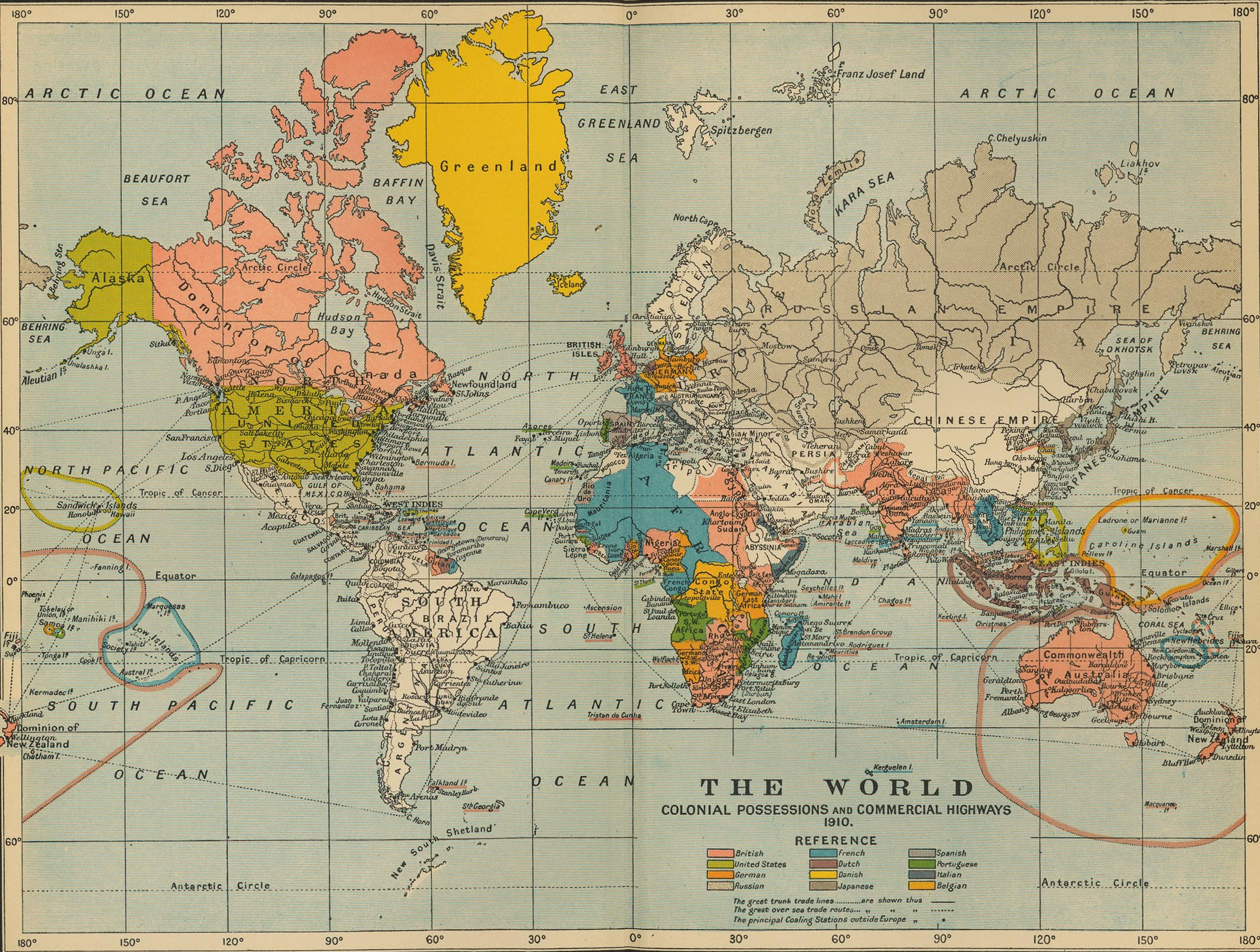
Western empires as they were in 1910

Although the West had had a presence in Africa for centuries, its colonies were limited mostly to Africa's coast. Europeans, including the Britons Mungo Park and David Livingstone, the German Johannes Rebmann, and the Frenchman René Caillié, explored the interior of the continent, allowing greater European expansion in the later 19th century.

The period between 1870 and 1914 is often called the Scramble for Africa, due to the competition between European nations for control of Africa. In 1830, France occupied Algeria in North Africa. Many Frenchmen settled on Algeria's Mediterranean coast. In 1882 Britain annexed Egypt. France eventually conquered most of Morocco and Tunisia as well. Libya was conquered by the Italians. Spain gained a small part of Morocco and modern-day Western Sahara. West Africa was dominated by France, although Britain ruled several smaller West African colonies. Germany also established two colonies in West Africa, and Portugal had one as well. Central Africa was dominated by the Belgian Congo. At first the colony was ruled by Belgium's king, Leopold II, however his regime was so brutal the Belgian government took over the colony.

The Germans and French also established colonies in Central Africa. The British and Italians were the two dominant powers in East Africa, although France also had a colony there. Southern Africa was dominated by Britain. Tensions between the British Empire and the Boer Republics led to the Boer Wars, fought on and off between the 1880s and 1902, ending in a British victory. In 1910 Britain united its South African colonies with the former Boer republics and established the Union of South Africa, a dominion of the British Empire. The British established several other colonies in Southern Africa. The Portuguese and Germans also established a presence in Southern Africa. The French conquered the island of Madagascar.

By 1914, Africa had only two independent nations, Liberia, a nation founded in West Africa by free black Americans earlier in the 19th century, and the ancient kingdom of Ethiopia in East Africa. Many Africans, like the Zulus and Ashanti, resisted European rule, but in the end Europe succeeded in conquering and transforming the continent. Missionaries arrived and established schools, while industrialists helped establish rubber, diamond and gold industries on the continent. Perhaps the most ambitious change by Europeans was the construction of the Suez Canal in Egypt, allowing ships to travel from the Atlantic to the Indian Ocean without having to go all the way around Africa.

In Asia, China was defeated by Britain in the First Opium War and later Britain and France in the Arrow War, forcing it to open up to trade with the West. Soon every major Western power as well as Russia and Japan had spheres of influence in China, although the country remained independent. Southeast Asia was divided between French Indochina and British Burma. One of the few independent nations in this region at the time was Siam. The Dutch continued to rule their colony of the Dutch East Indies, while Britain and Germany also established colonies in Oceania. India remained an integral part of the British Empire, with Queen Victoria being crowned Empress of India. The British even built a new capital in India, New Delhi. The Middle East remained largely under the rule of the Ottoman Empire and Persia. Britain, however, established a sphere of influence in Persia and a few small colonies in Arabia and coastal Mesopotamia.

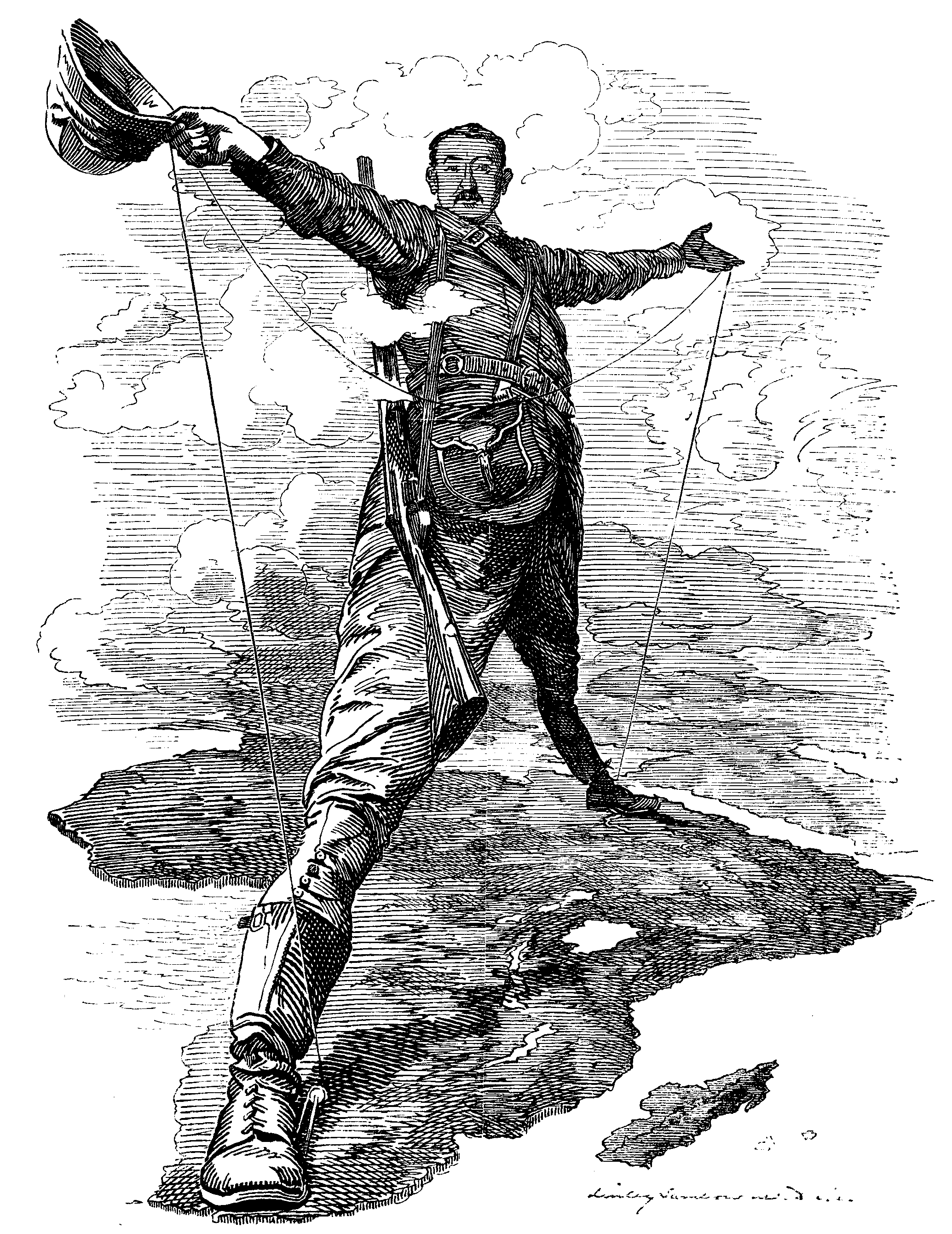
The Rhodes Colossus, a caricature of Cecil Rhodes after announcing plans for a telegraph line from Cape Town to Cairo. European countries were engaged in a Scramble for Africa.

The Pacific islands were conquered by Germany, the U.S., Britain, France, and Belgium. In 1893, the ruling class of colonists in Hawaii overthrew the Hawaiian monarchy of Queen Liliuokalani and established a republic. Since most of the leaders of the overthrow were Americans or descendants of Americans, they asked to be annexed by the United States, which agreed to the annexation in 1898.

Latin America was largely free from foreign rule throughout this period, although the United States and Britain had a great deal of influence over the region. Britain had two colonies on the Latin American mainland, while the United States, following 1898, had several in the Caribbean. The U.S. supported the independence of Cuba and Panama, but gained a small territory in central Panama and intervened in Cuba several times. Other countries also faced American interventions from time to time, mostly in the Caribbean and southern North America.

Competition over control of overseas colonies sometimes led to war between Western powers, and between Western powers and non-Westerners. At the turn of the 20th century, Britain fought several wars with Afghanistan to prevent it from falling under the influence of Russia, which ruled all of Central Asia excluding Afghanistan. Britain and France nearly went to war over control of Africa. In 1898, the United States and Spain went to war after an American naval ship was sunk in the Caribbean. Although today it is generally held that the sinking was an accident, at the time the U.S. held Spain responsible and soon American and Spanish forces clashed everywhere from Cuba to the Philippines. The U.S. won the war and gained several Caribbean colonies including Puerto Rico and several Pacific islands, including Guam and the Philippines. Important resistance movements to Western Imperialism included the Boxer Rebellion, fought against the colonial powers in China, and the Philippine–American War, fought against the United States, both of which failed.

The Russo-Turkish War (1877–78) left the Ottoman Empire little more than an empty shell, but the failing empire was able to hang on into the 20th century, until its final partition, which left the British and French colonial empires in control of much of the former Ottoman ruled Arab countries of the Middle East (British Mandate of Palestine, British Mandate of Mesopotamia, French Mandate of Syria, French Mandate of Lebanon, in addition to the British occupation of Egypt from 1882). Even though this happened centuries after the West had given up its futile attempts to conquer the "Holy Land" under religious pretexts, this fueled resentment against the "Crusaders" in the Islamic world, which along with the nationalisms hatched under Ottoman rule, contributed to the development of Islamism.

The expanding Western powers greatly changed the societies they conquered. Many connected their empires via railroad and telegraph and constructed churches, schools, and factories.

== Great powers and the First World War: 1870–1918 ==
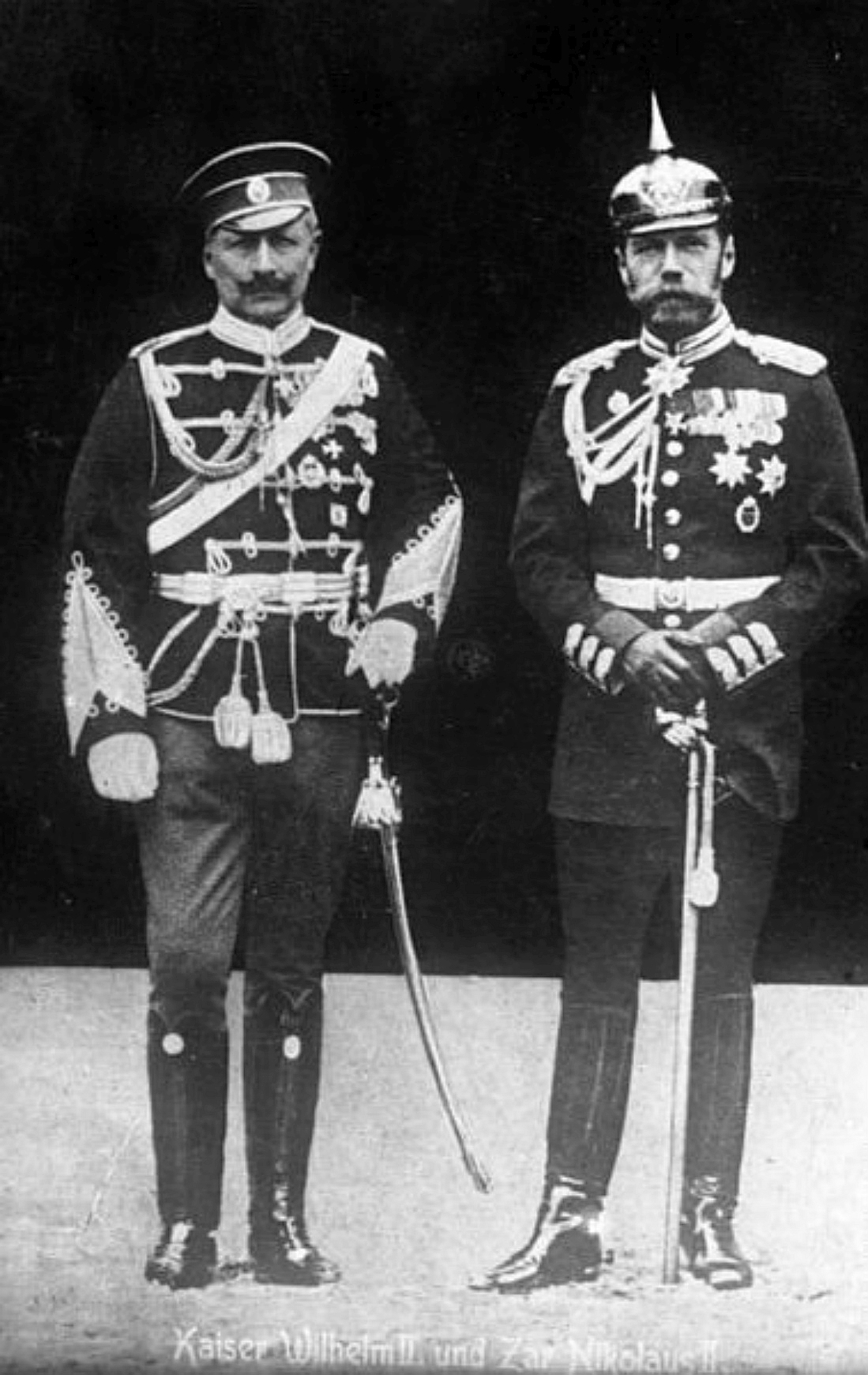
Cousins Kaiser Wilhelm II of Germany with Nicholas II of Russia in 1905, each in the military uniform of the other nation.

By the late 19th century, the world was dominated by a few great powers, including Great Britain, the United States, and Germany. France, Russia, Austria-Hungary, and Italy were also great powers.

Western inventors and industrialists transformed the West in the late 19th century and early 20th century. The American Thomas Edison pioneered electricity and motion picture technology. Other American inventors, the Wright brothers, completed the first successful airplane flight in 1903. The first automobiles were also invented in this period. Petroleum became an important commodity after the discovery it could be used to power machines. Steel was developed in Britain by Henry Bessemer. This very strong metal, combined with the invention of elevators, allowed people to construct very tall buildings, called skyscrapers.

In the late 19th century, the Italian Guglielmo Marconi was able to communicate across distances using radio. In 1876, the first telephone was invented by Alexander Graham Bell, a British expatriate living in America. Many became very wealthy from this Second Industrial Revolution, including the American entrepreneurs Andrew Carnegie and John D. Rockefeller. Unions continued to fight for the rights of workers, and by 1914 laws limiting working hours and outlawing child labor had been passed in many Western countries.

Culturally, the English-speaking nations were in the midst of the Victorian era, named for Britain's queen. In France, this period is called the Belle Époque, a period of many artistic and cultural achievements. The suffragette movement began in this period, which sought to gain voting rights for women, with New Zealand and Australian parliaments granting women's suffrage in the 1890s. However, by 1914, only a dozen U.S. states had given women this right, although women were treated more and more as equals of men before the law in many countries.

Cities grew as never before between 1870 and 1914. This led at first to unsanitary and crowded living conditions, especially for the poor. However, by 1914, municipal governments were providing police and fire departments and garbage removal services to their citizens, leading to a drop in death rates. Unfortunately, pollution from burning coal and wastes left by thousands of horses that crowded the streets worsened the quality of life in many urban areas. Paris, lit up by gas and electric light, and containing the tallest structure in the world at the time, the Eiffel Tower, was often looked to as an ideal modern city, and served as a model for city planners around the world.

=== United States: 1870–1914 ===
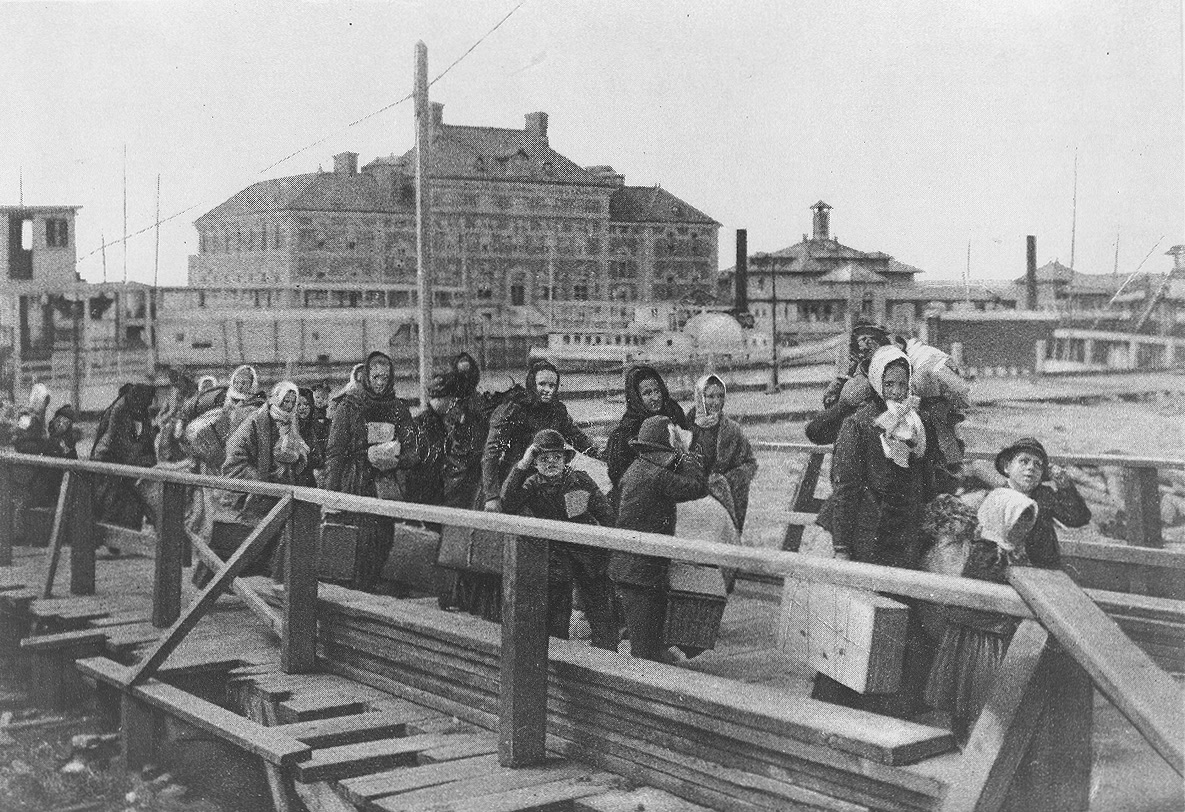
Immigrants at Ellis Island, New York Harbor, 1902

Following the American Civil War, great changes occurred in the United States. After the war, the former Confederate States were put under federal occupation and federal lawmakers attempted to gain equality for blacks by outlawing slavery and giving them citizenship. After several years, however, Southern states began rejoining the Union as their populations pledged loyalty to the United States government, and in 1877 Reconstruction as this period was called, came to an end. After being re-admitted to the Union, Southern lawmakers passed segregation laws and laws preventing blacks from voting, resulting in blacks being regarded as second-class citizens for decades to come.

Another great change beginning in the 1870s was the settlement of the western territories by Americans. The population growth in the American West led to the creation of many new western states, and by 1912 all the land of the contiguous U.S. was part of a state, bringing the total to 48. As whites settled the West, however, conflicts occurred with the Amerindians. After several Indian Wars, the Amerindians were forcibly relocated to small reservations throughout the West and by 1914 whites were the dominant ethnic group in the American West. As the farming and cattle industries of the American West matured and new technology allowed goods to be refrigerated and brought to other parts of the country and overseas, people's diets greatly improved and contributed to increased population growth throughout the West.

America's population greatly increased between 1870 and 1914, due largely to immigration. The U.S. had been receiving immigrants for decades but at the turn of the 20th century, the numbers greatly increased due partly to large population growth in Europe. Immigrants often faced discrimination, because many differed from most Americans in religion and culture. Despite this, most immigrants found work and enjoyed a greater degree of freedom than in their home countries. Major immigrant groups included the Irish, Italians, Russians, Scandinavians, Germans, Poles and Diaspora Jews. The vast majority, at least by the second generation, learned English, and adopted American culture, while at the same time contributing to that culture by, for example, introducing the celebration of ethnic holidays and foreign cuisine to America. These new groups also changed America's religious landscape. Although it remained mostly Protestant, Catholics especially, as well as Jews and Orthodox Christians, increased in number.

The U.S. became a major military and industrial power during this time, gaining a colonial empire from Spain and surpassing Britain and Germany to become the world's major industrial power by 1900. Despite this, most Americans were reluctant to get involved in world affairs, and American presidents generally tried to keep the U.S. out of foreign entanglement.

=== Europe: 1870–1914 ===
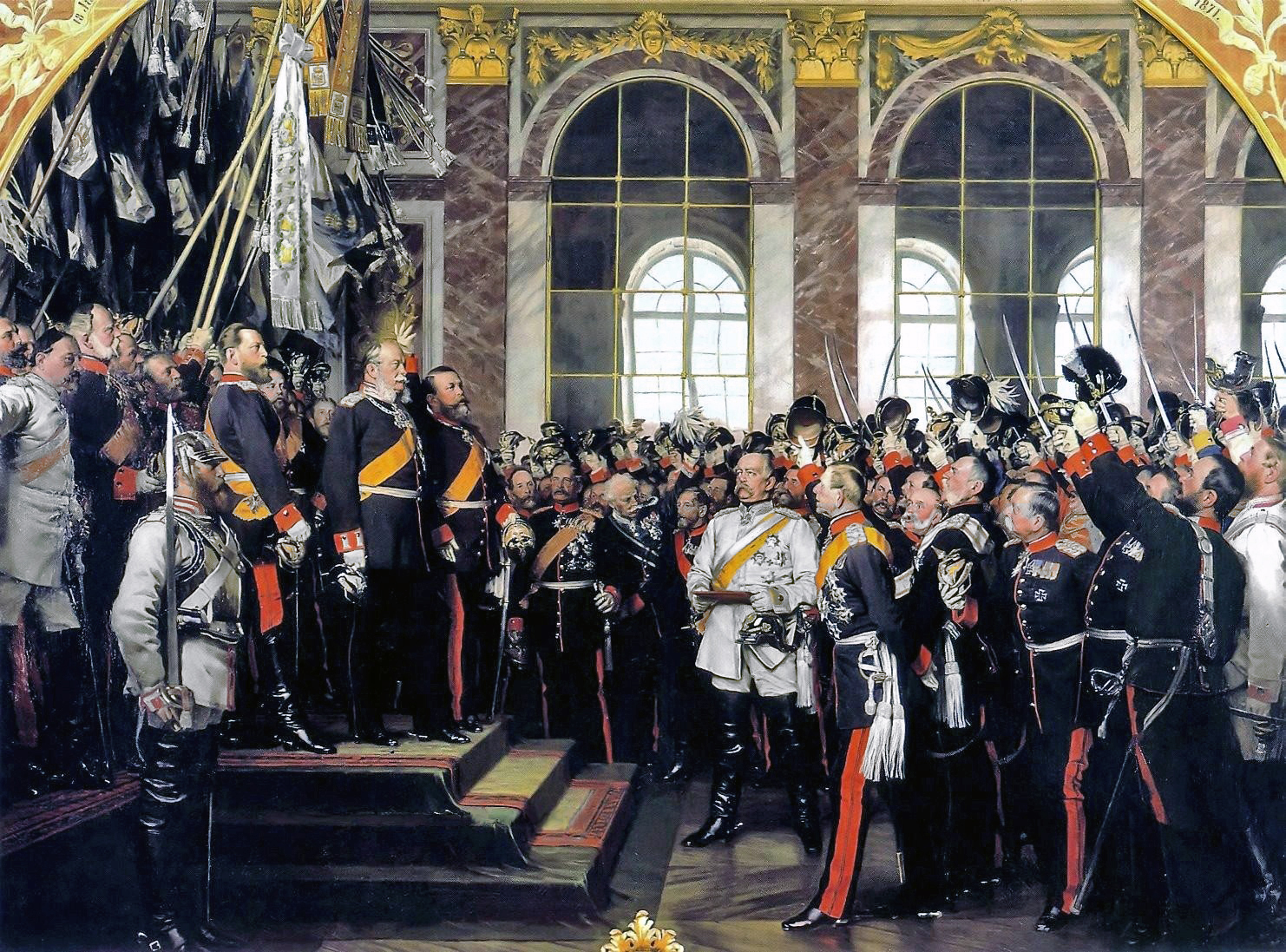
After the Unification of Germany, William I was proclaimed the first German Emperor.

The years between 1870 and 1914 saw the rise of Germany as the dominant power in Europe. By the late 19th century, Germany had surpassed Britain to become the world's greatest industrial power. It also had the mightiest army in Europe. From 1870 to 1871, Prussia was at war with France. Prussia won the war and gained two border territories, Alsace and Lorraine, from France. After the war, Wilhelm took the title kaiser from the Roman title caesar, proclaimed the German Empire, and all the German states other than Austria united with this new nation, under the leadership of Prussian chancellor Otto von Bismarck.

After the Franco-Prussian War, Napoleon III was dethroned and France was proclaimed a republic. During this time, France was increasingly divided between Catholics and monarchists and anticlerical and republican forces. In 1900, church and state were officially separated in France, although the majority of the population remained Catholic. France also found itself weakened industrially following its war with Prussia due to its loss of iron and coal mines following the war. In addition, France's population was smaller than Germany's and was hardly growing. Despite all this, France's strong sense of nationhood, among other things, kept the country together.

Between 1870 and 1914, Britain continued to peacefully switch between Liberal and Conservative governments, and maintained its vast empire, the largest in world history. Two problems faced by Britain in this period were the resentment of British rule in Ireland and Britain's falling behind Germany and the United States in industrial production.

=== British dominions: 1870–1914 ===
The European populations of Canada, Australia, New Zealand and South Africa all continued to grow and thrive in this period and evolved democratic Westminster system parliaments.

Canada united as a dominion of the British Empire under the Constitution Act, 1867 (British North America Acts). The colony of New Zealand gained its own parliament (called a "general assembly") and home rule in 1852. and in 1907 was proclaimed the Dominion of New Zealand. Britain began to grant its Australian colonies autonomy beginning in the 1850s and during the 1890s, the colonies of Australia voted to unite. In 1901 they were federated as an independent nation under the British Crown, known as the Commonwealth of Australia, with a wholly elected bicameral parliament. The Constitution of Australia had been drafted in Australia and approved by popular consent. Thus Australia is one of the few countries established by a popular vote. The Second Boer War (1899–1902) ended with the conversion of the Boer republics of South Africa into British colonies and these colonies later formed part of the Union of South Africa in 1910 with equal rights for the Boers, who dominated elections.

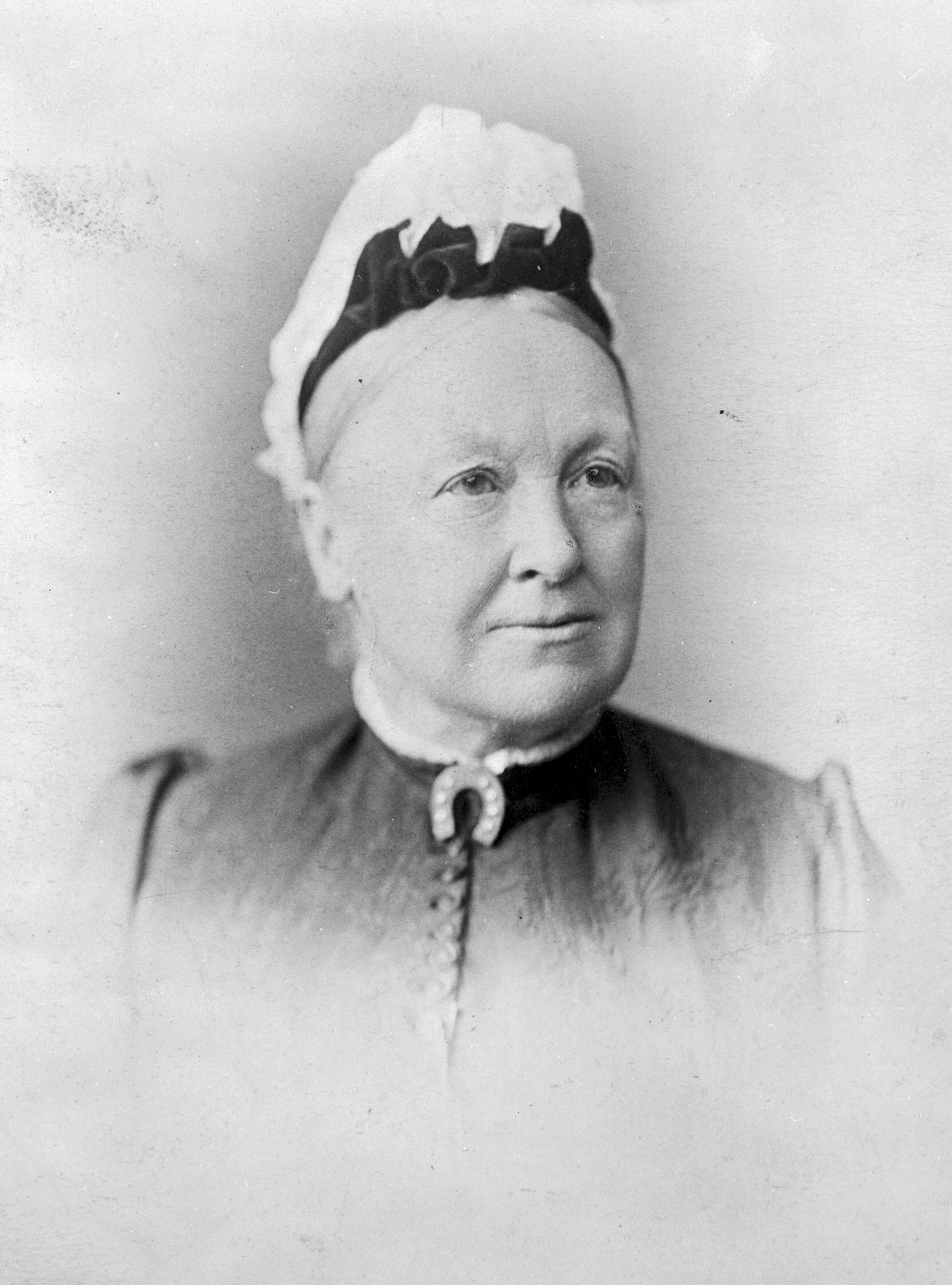
South Australian suffragette Catherine Helen Spence.

From the 1850s, Canada, Australia and New Zealand had become laboratories of democracy. By the 1870s, they had already granted voting rights to their citizens in advance of most other Western nations. In 1893, New Zealand became the first self-governing nation to extend the right to vote to women and, in 1895, the women of South Australia also became the first to obtain the right to stand for Parliament.

During the 1890s Australia also saw such milestones as the invention of the secret ballot, the introduction of a minimum wage and the election of the world's first Labor Party government, prefiguring the emergence of Social Democratic governments in Europe. The old age pension was established in Australia and New Zealand by 1900.

From the 1880s, the Heidelberg School of art adapted Western painting techniques to Australian conditions, while writers like Banjo Paterson and Henry Lawson introduced the character of a new continent into English literature and antipodean artists such as the opera singer Dame Nellie Melba began to influence the European arts.

=== Rival alliances ===
European military alliances prior to the outbreak of war. Triple Entente Triple Alliance Neutral

The late 19th century saw the creation of two rival alliances in Europe. Germany, Italy, and Austria-Hungary formed the Triple Alliance. France and Russia also developed strong relations with one another, due to the financing of Russia's Industrial Revolution by French capitalists. Although it did not have a formal alliance, Russia supported the Slavic Orthodox nations of the Balkans and the Caucasus, which had been created in the 19th century after several wars and revolutions against the Ottoman Empire, which by now was in decline and ruled only parts of the southern Balkan Peninsula. This Russian policy, called Pan-Slavism, led to conflicts with the Ottoman and Austro-Hungarian Empires, which had many Slavic subjects. Franco-German relations were also tense in this period due to France's defeat and loss of land at the hands of Prussia in the Franco-Prussian War. Also in this period, Britain ended its policy of isolation from the European continent and formed an alliance with France, called the Entente Cordiale. Rather than achieve greater security for the nations of Europe, however, these alliances increased the chances of a general European war breaking out.

Other factors that eventually led to World War I were the competition for overseas colonies, the military buildups of the period (most notably Germany's), and the feeling of intense nationalism throughout the continent.

=== World War I ===
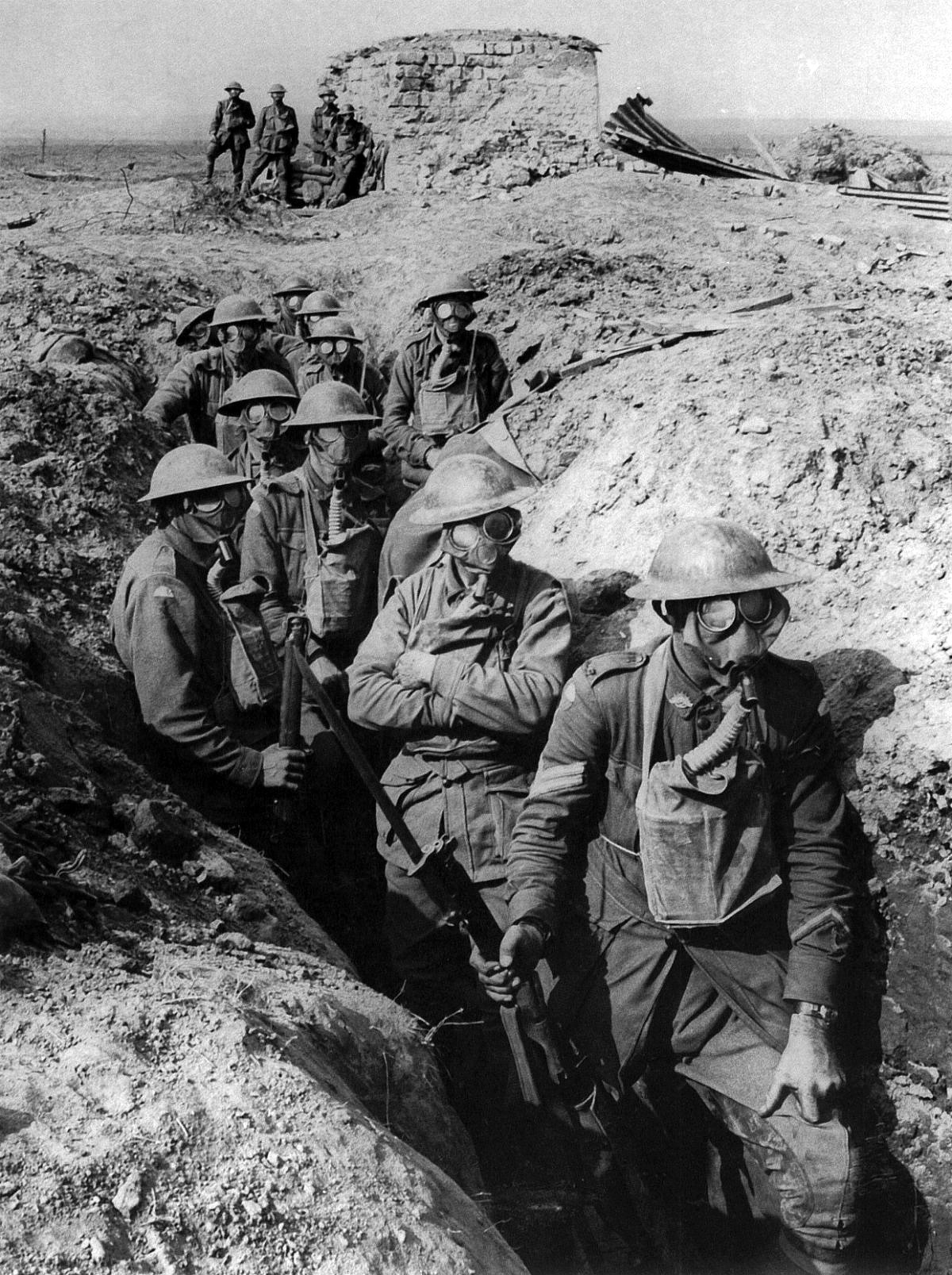
Australian troops at the Battle of Passchendaele in 1917.

When the war broke out, much of the fighting was between Western powers, and the immediate casus belli was an assassination. The victim was the heir to the Austro-Hungarian throne, Franz Ferdinand, and he was assassinated on 28 June 1914 by a Yugoslav nationalist named Gavrilo Princip in the city of Sarajevo, at the time part of the Austro-Hungarian Empire. Although Serbia agreed to all but one point of the Austrian ultimatum (it did not take responsibility in planning the assassination but was ready to hand over any subject involved on its territory), Austria-Hungary was more than eager to declare war, attacked Serbia and effectively began World War I. Fearing the conquest of a fellow Slavic Orthodox nation, Russia declared war on Austria-Hungary. Germany responded by declaring war on Russia as well as France, which it feared would ally with Russia.

To reach France, Germany invaded neutral Belgium in August, leading Britain to declare war on Germany. The war quickly stalemated, with trenches being dug from the North Sea to Switzerland. The war also made use of new and relatively new technology and weapons, including machine guns, airplanes, tanks, battleships, and submarines. Even chemical weapons were used at one point. The war also involved other nations, with Romania and Greece joining the British Empire and France and Bulgaria and the Ottoman Empire joining Germany. The war spread throughout the globe with colonial armies clashing in Africa and Pacific nations such as Japan and Australia, allied with Britain, attacking German colonies in the Pacific.

In the Middle East, the Australian and New Zealand Army Corps landed at Gallipoli in 1915 in a failed bid to support an Anglo-French capture of the Ottoman capital of Istanbul. Unable to secure an early victory in 1915, British Empire forces later attacked from further south after the beginning of the Arab revolt and conquered Mesopotamia and Palestine from the Ottomans with the support of local Arab rebels. The British Empire also supported an Arab revolt against the Ottomans that was centered in the Arabian Peninsula.

1916 saw some of the most ferocious fighting in human history with the Somme Offensive on the Western Front alone resulting in 500,000 German casualties, 420,000 British and Dominion casualties, and 200,000 French casualties.

1917 was a crucial year in the war. The United States had followed a policy of neutrality in the war, feeling it was a European conflict. However, during the course of the war many Americans had died on board British ocean liners sunk by the Germans, leading to anti-German feelings in the U.S. There had also been incidents of sabotage on American soil, including the Black Tom explosion. What finally led to American involvement in the war, however, was the discovery of the Zimmermann Telegram, in which Germany offered to help Mexico conquer part of the United States if it formed an alliance with Germany. In April, the U.S. declared war on Germany.

The same year the U.S. entered the war, Russia withdrew. After the deaths of many Russian soldiers and hunger in Russia, a revolution occurred against the Czar, Nicholas II. Nicholas abdicated and a Liberal provisional government was set up. In October, Russian communists, led by Vladimir Lenin rose up against the government, resulting in a civil war. Eventually, the communists won and Lenin became premier. Feeling World War I was a capitalist conflict, Lenin signed a peace treaty with Germany in which it gave up a great deal of its Central and Eastern European lands.

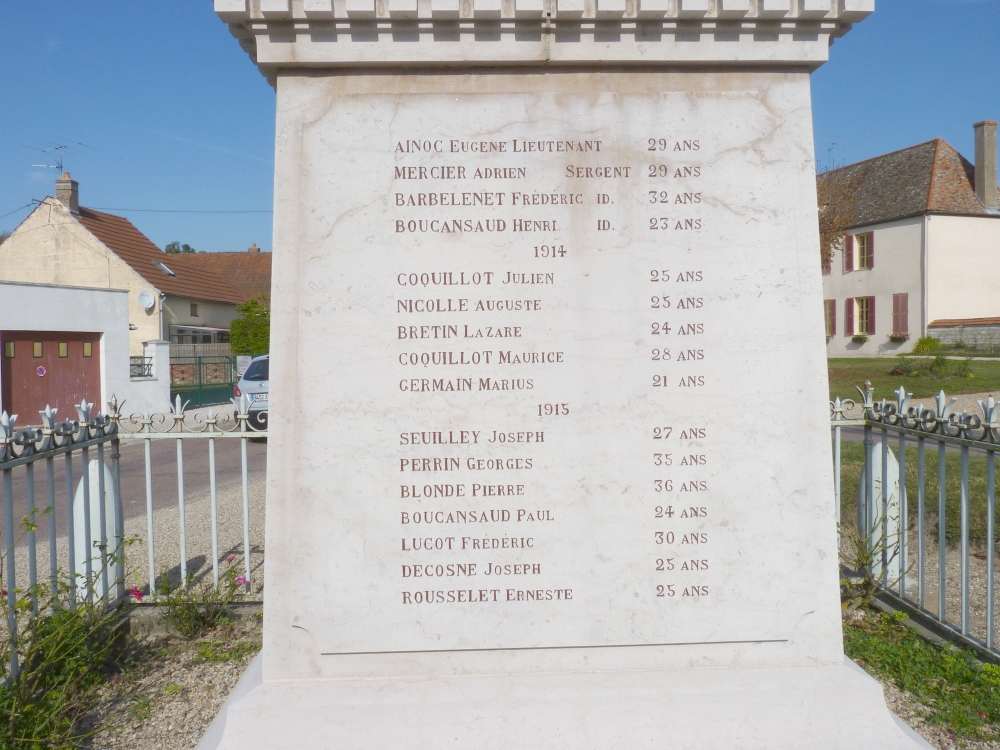
A typical village war memorial to soldiers killed in World War I

Although Germany and its allies no longer had to focus on Russia, the large numbers of American troops and weapons reaching Europe turned the tide against Germany, and after more than a year of fighting, Germany surrendered.

The treaties which ended the war, including the famous Versailles Treaty dealt harshly with Germany and its former allies. The Austro-Hungarian Empire were completely abolished and Germany was greatly reduced in size. Many nations regained their independence, including Poland, Czechoslovakia, and Yugoslavia. The last Austro-Hungarian emperor abdicated, and two new republics, Austria and Hungary, were created. The last Ottoman sultan was overthrown by the Turkish nationalist revolutionary named Atatürk and the Ottoman homeland of Turkey was declared a republic. Germany's kaiser also abdicated and Germany was declared a republic. Germany was also forced to give up the lands it had gained in the Franco-Prussian War to France, accept responsibility for the war, reduce its military and pay reparations to Britain and France.

In the Middle East, Britain gained Palestine, Transjordan (modern-day Jordan), and Mesopotamia as colonies. France gained Syria and Lebanon. An independent kingdom consisting of most of the Arabian peninsula, Saudi Arabia, was also established. Germany's colonies in Africa, Asia, and the Pacific were divided between the British and French Empires.

The war had cost millions of lives and led many in the West to develop a strong distaste for war. Few were satisfied with, and many despised the agreements made at the end of the war. Japanese and Italians were angry that they had not been given any new colonies after the war, and many Americans felt the war had been a mistake. Germans were outraged at the state of their country following the war. Also, unlike many in the United States had hoped for, democracy did not flourish in the world in the post-war period. The League of Nations, an international organization proposed by American president Woodrow Wilson to prevent another great war from breaking out, proved ineffective, especially because the United States Senate stopped Wilson White House from ratifying U.S. membership.

== Interwar years: 1918–1939 ==
=== United States in the interwar years ===
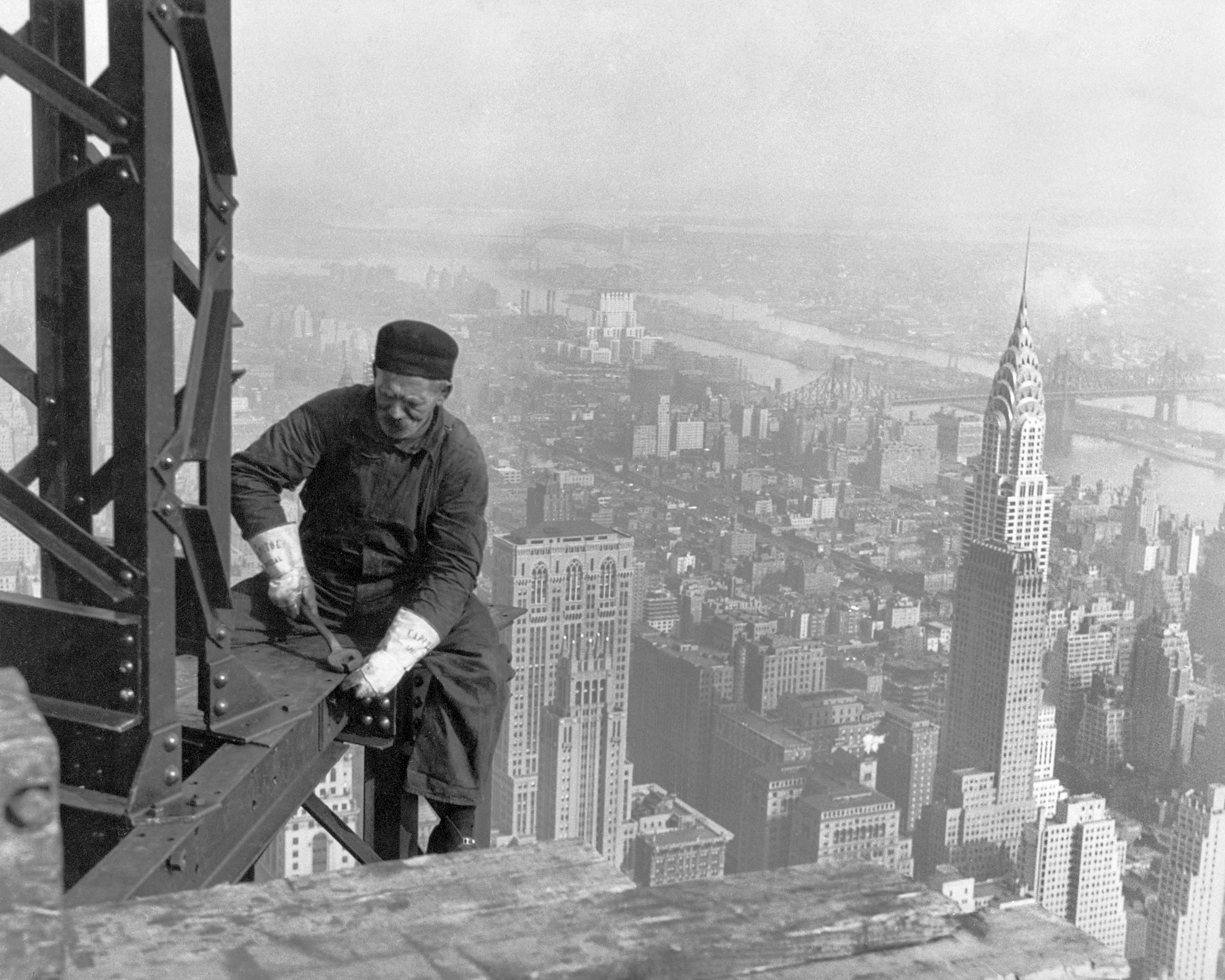
Construction on the Empire State Building was a symbol of U.S. economic growth after the First World War.

After World War I, most Americans regretted getting involved in world affairs and desired a "return to normalcy". The 1920s were a period of economic prosperity in the United States. Many Americans bought cars, radios, and other appliances with the help of installment payments. Also, many Americans invested in the stock market as a source of income. Movie theaters sprang up throughout the country, although at first they did not have sound. Alcoholic beverages were outlawed in the United States and women were granted the right to vote. Although the United States was arguably the most powerful nation in the post-war period, Americans remained isolationist and elected several conservative presidents during this period.

In October 1929 the New York stock market crashed, leading to the Great Depression. Many lost their life's savings and the resulting decline in consumer spending led millions to lose their jobs as banks and businesses closed. In the Midwestern United States, a severe drought destroyed many farmers' livelihoods. In 1932, Americans elected Franklin D. Roosevelt president. Roosevelt followed a series of policies which regulated the stock market and banks, and created many public works programs aimed at providing the unemployed with work. Roosevelt's policies helped alleviate the worst effects of the Depression, although by 1941 the Great Depression was still ongoing. Roosevelt also instituted pensions for the elderly and provided money to those who were unemployed. Roosevelt was also one of the most popular presidents in U.S. history, earning re-election in 1936, and also in 1940 and 1944, becoming the only U.S. president to serve more than two terms.

=== Europe in the interwar years ===
Map of territorial changes in Europe after World War I (as of 1923)

Europe was relatively unstable following World War I. Although many prospered in the 1920s, Germany was in a deep financial and economic crisis. Also, France and Britain owed the U.S. a great deal of money. When the United States went into Depression, so did Europe. There were perhaps 30 million people around the world unemployed following the Depression. Many governments helped to alleviate the suffering of their citizens and by 1937 the economy had improved although the lingering effects of the Depression remained. Also, the Depression led to the spread of radical left-wing and right-wing ideologies, like Communism and Fascism.

In 1919–1921 Polish–Soviet War took place. After the Russian Revolution of 1917 Russia sought to spread communism to the rest of Europe. This is evidenced by the well-known daily order by marshal Tukhachevsky to his troops: "Over the corpse of Poland leads the road to the world's fire. Towards Wilno, Minsk, Warsaw go!". Poland, whose statehood had just been re-established by the Treaty of Versailles following the Partitions of Poland in the late 18th century achieved an unexpected and decisive victory at the Battle of Warsaw. In the wake of the Polish advance eastward, the Soviets sued for peace and the war ended with a ceasefire in October 1920. A formal peace treaty, the Peace of Riga, was signed on 18 March 1921. According to the British historian A. J. P. Taylor, the Polish–Soviet War "largely determined the course of European history for the next twenty years or more. [...] Unavowedly and almost unconsciously, Soviet leaders abandoned the cause of international revolution." It would be twenty years before the Bolsheviks would send their armies abroad to 'make revolution'. According to American sociologist Alexander Gella, "the Polish victory had gained twenty years of independence not only for Poland, but at least for an entire central part of Europe."

In 1916, militant Irish republicans staged a rising and proclaimed a republic. The rising was suppressed after six days with leaders of the rising being executed. This was followed by the Irish War of Independence in 1919–1921 and the Irish Civil War (1922–1923). After the civil war, the island was divided. Northern Ireland remained part of the United Kingdom, while the rest of the island became the Irish Free State. In 1927, the United Kingdom renamed itself the United Kingdom of Great Britain and Northern Ireland.

In 1918, the UK granted the right to vote to women.

=== British dominions in the interwar years ===
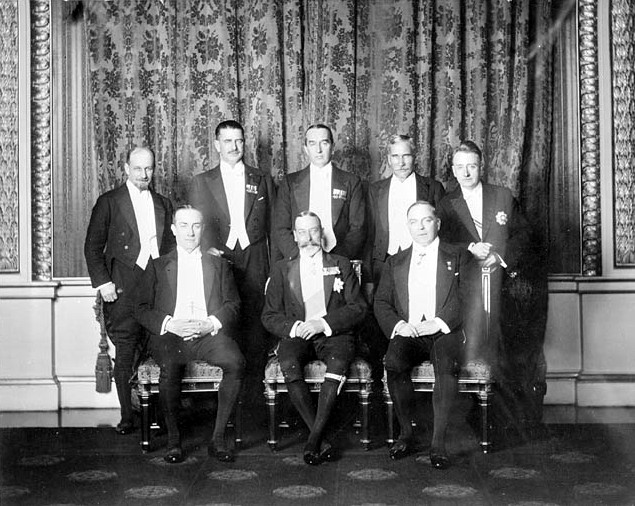
1926 Imperial Conference: King George V and the prime ministers of the Commonwealth. Clockwise from centre front: George V, Baldwin (United Kingdom), Monroe (Newfoundland), Coates (New Zealand), Bruce (Australia), Hertzog (South Africa), Cosgrave (Irish Free State), King (Canada).

The relationship between Britain and its Empire evolved significantly over the period. In 1919, the British Empire was represented at the all-important Versailles Peace Conference by delegates from its dominions who had each suffered large casualties during the War.

The Balfour Declaration at the 1926 Imperial Conference, stated that Britain and its dominions were "equal in status, in no way subordinate one to another in any aspect of their domestic or external affairs, though united by common allegiance to the Crown, and freely associated as members of the British Commonwealth of Nations". These aspects to the relationship were eventually formalised by the Statute of Westminster in 1931 – a British law which, at the request and with the consent of the dominion parliaments clarified the independent powers of the dominion parliaments, and granted the former colonies full legal freedom except areas where they chose to remain subordinate. Previously the British Parliament had had residual ill-defined powers, and overriding authority, over dominion legislation. It applied to the six dominions which existed in 1931: Canada, Australia, the Irish Free State, the Dominion of Newfoundland, New Zealand, and the Union of South Africa.

Each of the dominions remained within the British Commonwealth and retained close political and cultural ties with Britain and continued to recognize the British monarch as head of their own independent nations. Australia, New Zealand, and Newfoundland had to ratify the statute for it to take effect. Australia and New Zealand did so in 1942 and 1947 respectively. Newfoundland united with Canada in 1949 and the Irish Free State came to an end in 1937, when the citizens voted by referendum to replace its 1922 constitution. It was succeeded by the entirely sovereign modern state of Ireland.

=== Rise of totalitarianism ===
The inter-war years saw the establishment of the first totalitarian regimes in world history. The first was established in Russia following the revolution of 1917. The Russian Empire was renamed the Union of Soviet Socialist Republics, or Soviet Union. The government controlled every aspect of its citizens' lives, from maintaining loyalty to the Communist Party to persecuting religion. Lenin helped to establish this state but it was brought to a new level of brutality under his successor, Joseph Stalin.

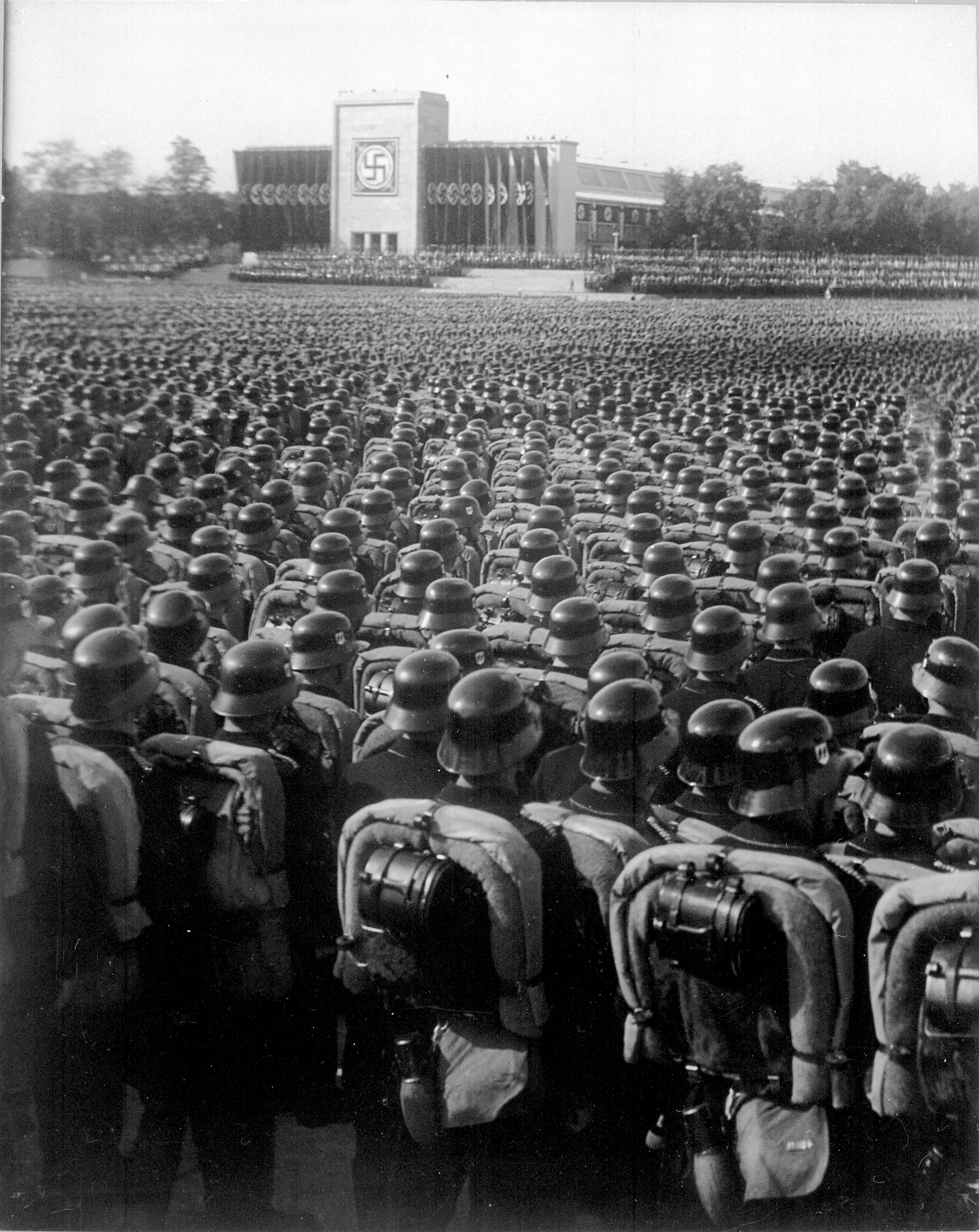
The rise of Fascism in Europe

The first totalitarian state in the West was established in Italy. Unlike the Soviet Union however, this would be a Fascist rather than a Communist state. Fascism is a less organized ideology than Communism, but generally it is characterized by a total rejection of humanism and liberal democracy, as well as very intense nationalism, with a government headed by a single all-powerful dictator. The Italian politician Benito Mussolini established the Fascist Party (from which Fascism derives its name) following World War I. Fascists won the support of many disillusioned Italians, who were angry over Italy's treatment following World War I. They also employed violence and intimidation against their political enemies. In 1922, Mussolini seized power by threatening to lead his followers on a march on Rome if he was not named prime minister. Although he had to share some power with the monarchy, Mussolini ruled as a dictator.

Under his rule, Italy's military was built up and democracy became a thing of the past. One important diplomatic achievement of his reign, however, was the Lateran Treaty, between Italy and the Pope, in which a small part of Rome where St. Peter's Basilica and other Church property was located was given independence as Vatican City and the Pope was reimbursed for lost Church property. In exchange, the Pope recognized the Italian government.

Another Fascist party, the Nazis, would take power in Germany. The Nazis were similar to Mussolini's Fascists but held many views of their own. Nazis were obsessed with racial theory, believing Germans to be part of a master race, destined to dominate the inferior races of the world. The Nazis were especially hateful of Jews. Another unique aspect of Nazism was its connection with a small movement that supported a return to ancient Germanic paganism. Adolf Hitler, a World War I veteran, became leader of the party in 1921. Gaining support from many disillusioned Germans, and by using intimidation against its enemies, the Nazi party had gained a great deal of power by the early 1930s. In 1933, Hitler was named Chancellor, and seized dictatorial power. Hitler built up Germany's military in violation of the Versailles Treaty and stripped Jews of all rights in Germany. Eventually, the regime Hitler created would lead to the Second World War.

In Spain, a Republic was proclaimed in 1931 in the wake of the demise of the Bourbon monarchic regime and its dictatorial solution. In 1936, a military coup d'état against the republic started the Spanish Civil War, which ended in 1939 with the victory of the rebel side (supported by Fascist Italy and Nazi Germany), and with Francisco Franco as dictator.

== Second World War and its aftermath: 1939–1950 ==
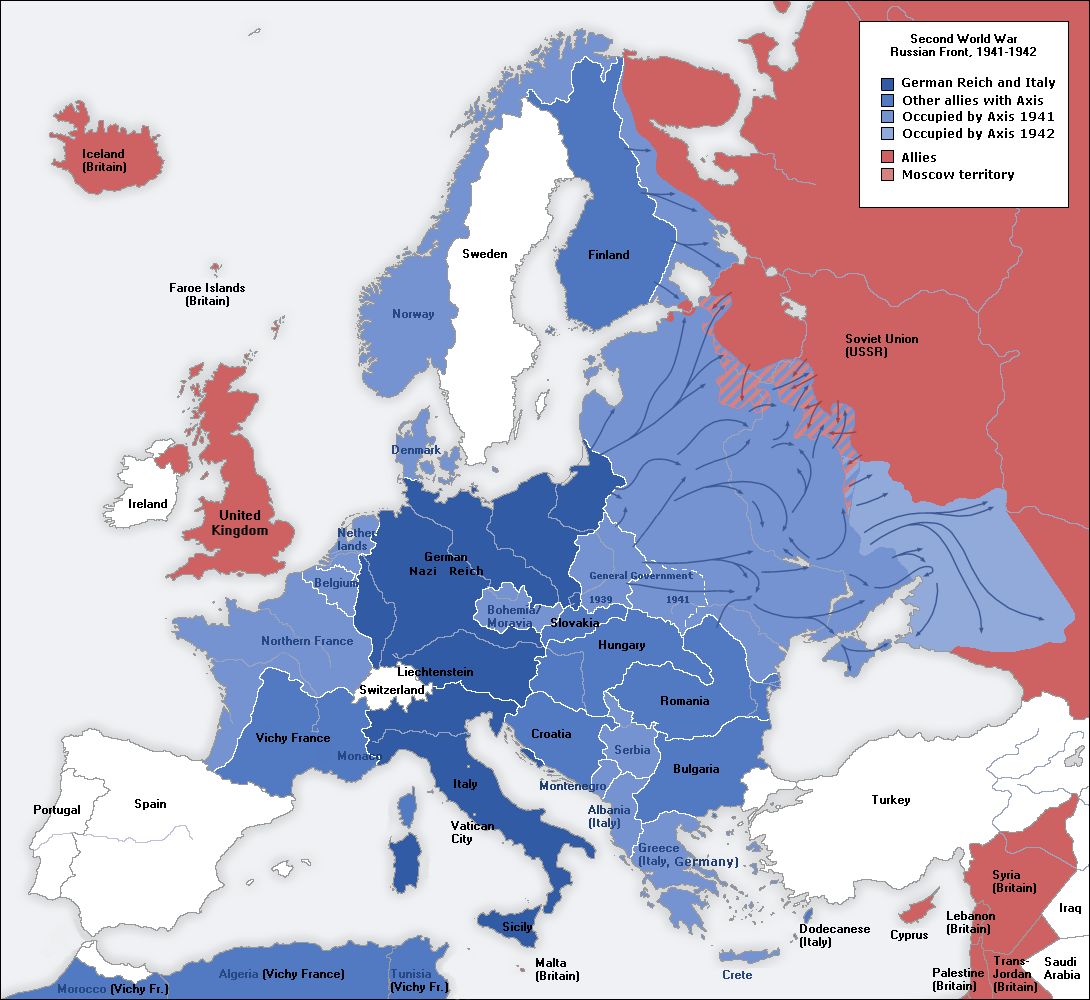
German occupation of continental Europe and northern Africa.

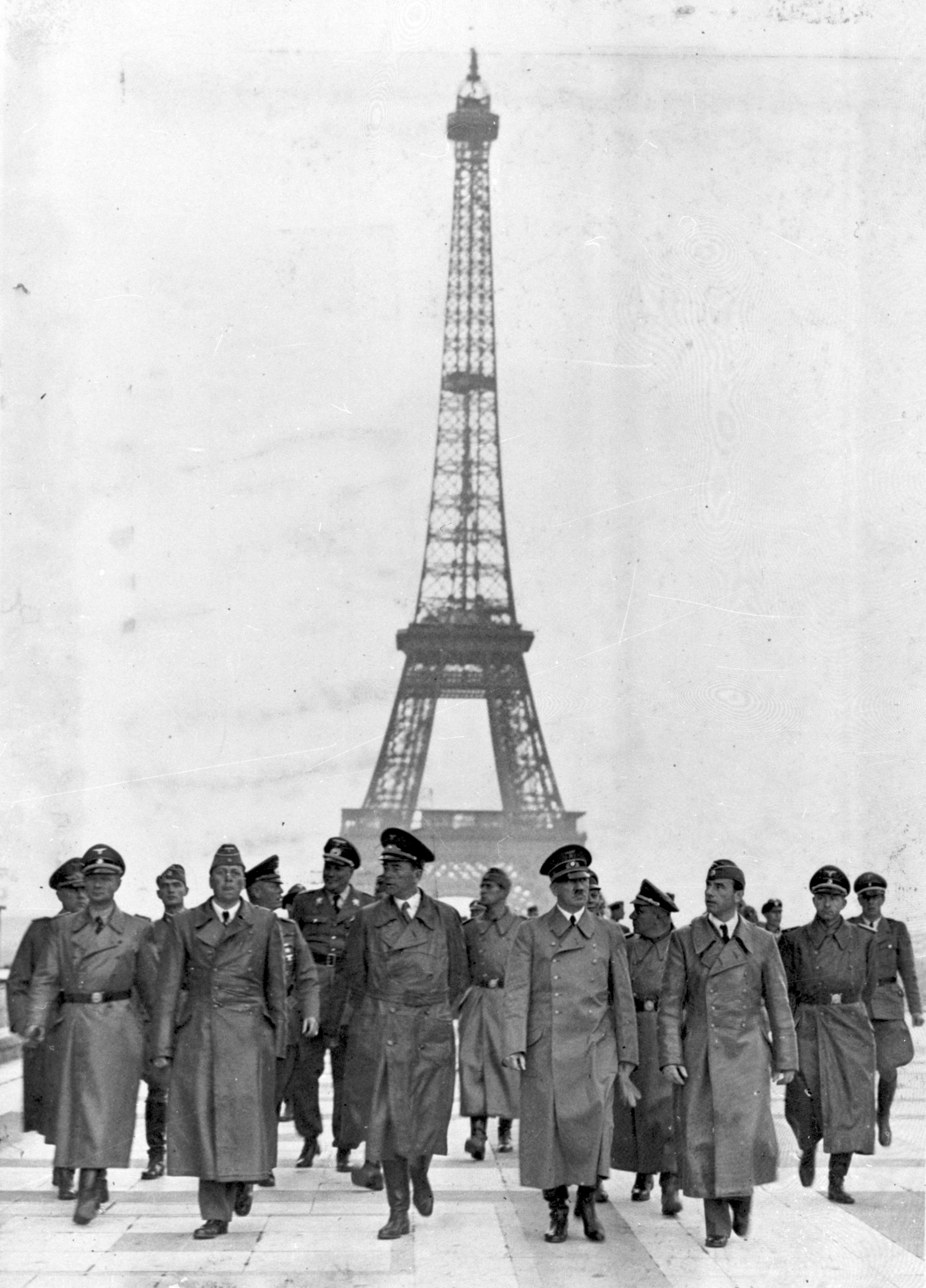
Hitler in Paris, 30 July 1940

The late 1930s saw a series of violations of the Versailles Treaty by Germany, however, France and Britain refused to act. In 1938, Hitler annexed Austria in an attempt to unite all German-speakers under his rule. Next, he annexed a German-speaking area of Czechoslovakia. Britain and France agreed to recognize his rule over that land and in exchange Hitler agreed not to expand his empire further. In a matter of months, however, Hitler broke the pledge and annexed the rest of Czechoslovakia. Despite this, the British and French chose to do nothing, wanting to avoid war at any cost. Hitler then formed a secret non-aggression pact with the Soviet Union, despite the fact that the Soviet Union was Communist and Germany was Nazi.

Also in the 1930s, Italy conquered Ethiopia. The Soviets too began annexing neighboring countries. Japan began taking aggressive actions towards China. After Japan opened itself to trade with the West in the mid-19th century, its leaders learned to take advantage of Western technology and industrialized their country by the end of the century. By the 1930s, Japan's government was under the control of militarists who wanted to establish an empire in the Asia-Pacific region. In 1937, Japan invaded China.

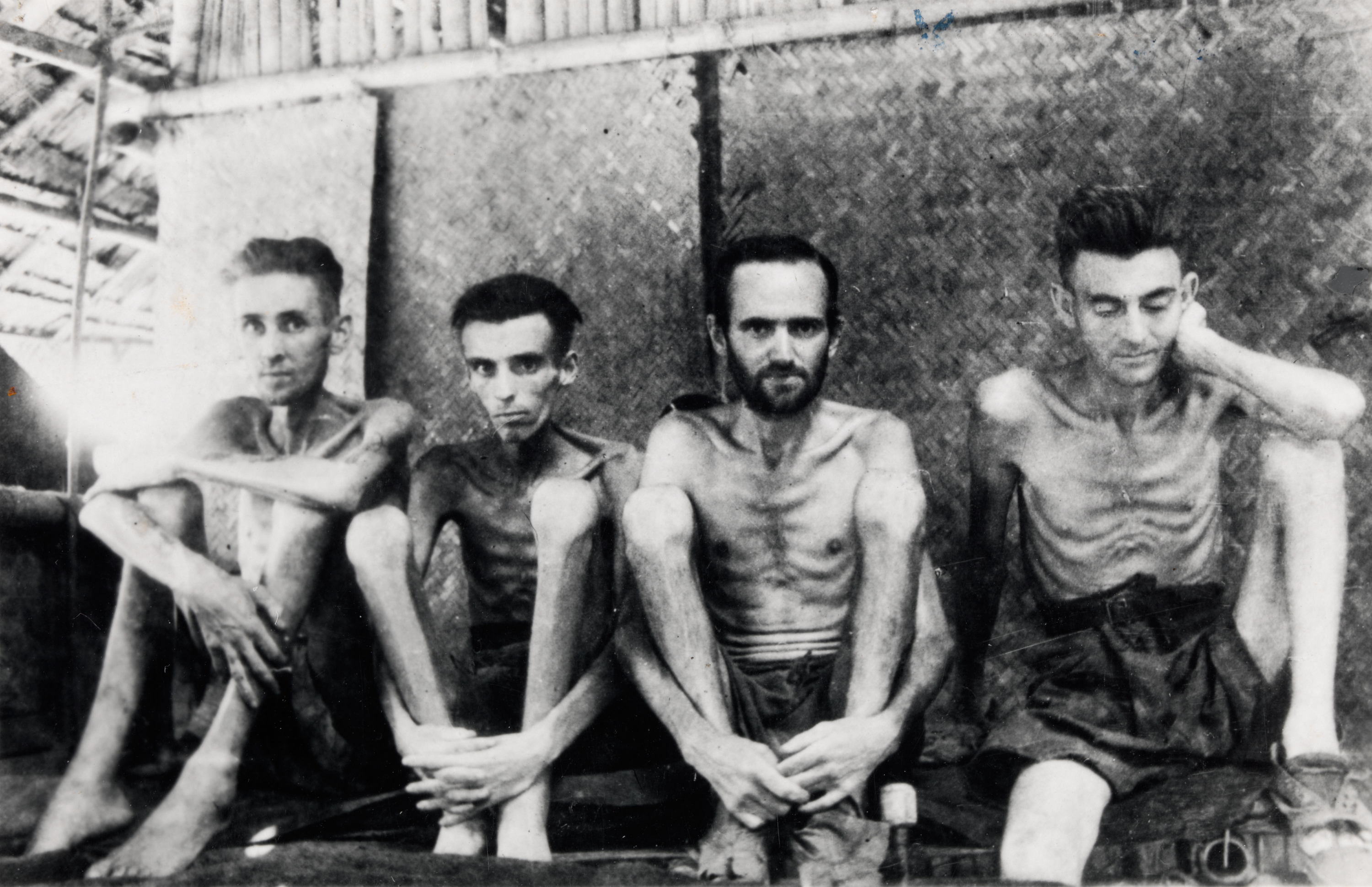
Netherlands and Australian PoWs of the Empire of Japan in 1943. The Fall of Singapore to Japan marked the greatest defeat in British military history.

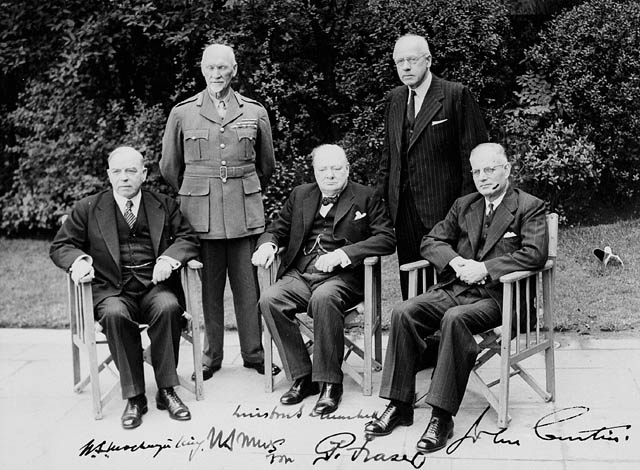
Britain's World War II Prime Minister Winston Churchill (seated centre) with the prime ministers of the Commonwealth of Nations at the 1944 Commonwealth Prime Ministers' Conference.

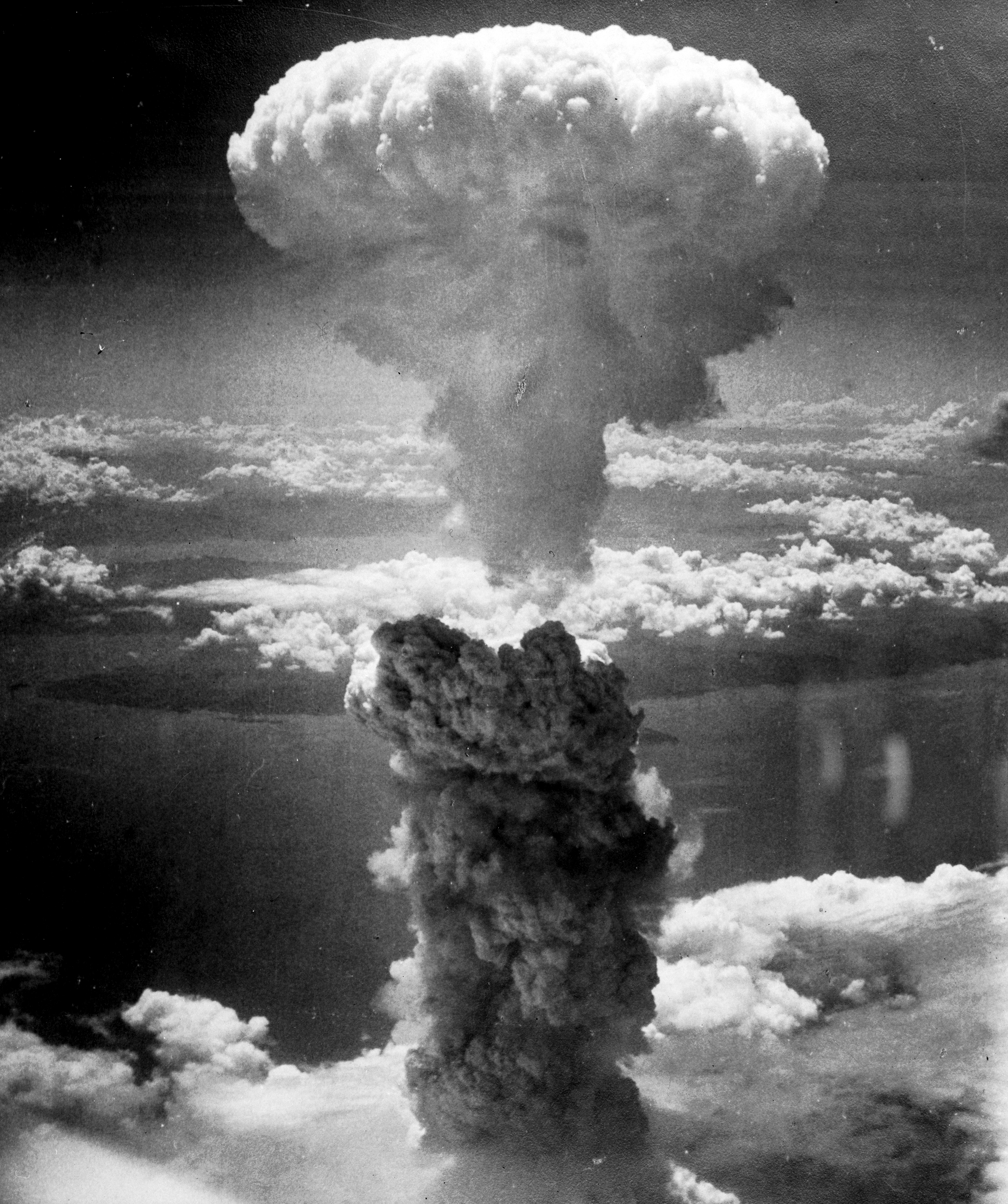
The Atomic bombings of Hiroshima and Nagasaki by the U.S. Air Force brought the Second World War to an end.

In 1939, German forces invaded Poland, and soon the country was divided between the Soviet Union and Germany. France and Britain declared war on Germany, World War II had begun. The war featured the use of new technologies and improvements on existing ones. Airplanes called bombers were capable of travelling great distances and dropping bombs on targets. Submarine, tank and battleship technology also improved. Most soldiers were equipped with hand-held machine guns and armies were more mobile than ever before. Also, the British invention of radar would revolutionize tactics. German forces invaded and conquered the Low Countries and by June had even conquered France. In 1940 Germany, Italy and Japan formed an alliance and became known as the Axis powers. Germany next turned its attention to Britain.

Hitler attempted to defeat the British using only air power. In the Battle of Britain, German bombers destroyed much of the British air force and many British cities. Led by their prime minister, the defiant Winston Churchill, the British refused to give up and launched air attacks on Germany. Eventually, Hitler turned his attention from Britain to the Soviet Union. In June 1941, German forces invaded the Soviet Union and soon reached deep into Russia, surrounding Moscow, Leningrad, and Stalingrad. Hitler's invasion came as a total surprise to Stalin; however, Hitler had always believed sooner or later Soviet Communism and what he believed were the "inferior" Slavic peoples had to be wiped out.

The United States attempted to remain neutral early in the war. However, a growing number feared the consequences of a Fascist victory. President Roosevelt began sending weapons and support to the British, Chinese, and Soviets. Also, the U.S. placed an embargo against the Japanese, as they continued their war with China and conquered many colonies formerly ruled by the French and Dutch, who were now under German rule. In 1941, Japan launched a surprise attack on Pearl Harbor, an American naval base in Hawaii. The U.S. responded by declaring war on Japan. The next day, Germany and Italy declared war on the United States. The United States, the British Commonwealth, and the Soviet Union now constituted the Allies, dedicated to destroying the Axis powers. Other allied nations included Canada, Australia, New Zealand, South Africa and China.

In the Pacific War, British, Indian and Australian troops made a disorganised last stand at Singapore, before surrendering on 15 February 1942. The defeat was the worst in British military history. Around 15,000 Australian soldiers alone became prisoners of war. Allied prisoners died in their thousands interned at Changi Prison or working as slave labourers on such projects as the infamous Burma Railway and the Sandakan Death Marches. Australian cities and bases – notably Darwin suffered air raids and Sydney suffered naval attack. U.S. General Douglas MacArthur, based in Melbourne, Australia became "Supreme Allied Commander of the South West Pacific" and the foundations of the post war Australia-New Zealand-United States Alliance were laid.

In May 1942, the Royal Australian Navy and U.S. Navy engaged the Japanese in the Battle of the Coral Sea and halted the Japanese fleet headed for Australian waters. The Battle of Midway in June effectively defeated the Japanese navy. In August 1942, Australian forces inflicted the first land defeat on advancing Japanese forces at the Battle of Milne Bay in the Australian Territory of New Guinea.

By 1942, German and Italian armies ruled Norway, the Low Countries, France, the Balkans, Central Europe, part of Russia, and most of North Africa. Japan by this year ruled much of China, Southeast Asia, Indonesia, the Philippines, and many Pacific Islands. Life in these empires was cruel – especially in Germany, where the Holocaust was perpetrated. Eleven million people – six million of them Jews – were systematically murdered by the German Nazis by 1945.

From 1943 on, the Allies gained the upper hand. American and British troops first liberated North Africa from the Germans and Italians. Next they invaded Italy, where Mussolini was deposed by the king and later was killed by Italian partisans. Italy surrendered and came under Allied occupation. After the liberation of Italy, American, British, and Canadian troops crossed the English Channel and liberated Normandy, France, from German rule after great loss of life. The Western Allies were then able to liberate the rest of France and move towards Germany. During these campaigns in Africa and Western Europe, the Soviets fought off the Germans, pushing them out of the Soviet Union altogether and driving them out of Eastern and East-Central Europe. In 1945 the Western Allies and Soviets invaded Germany itself. The Soviets captured Berlin and Hitler committed suicide. Germany surrendered unconditionally and came under Allied occupation. The war against Japan continued however. American forces from 1943 on had worked their way across the Pacific, liberating territory from the Japanese. The British also fought the Japanese in such places as Burma. By 1945, the U.S. had surrounded Japan, however the Japanese refused to surrender. Fearing a land invasion would cost one million American lives, the U.S. used a new weapon against Japan, the atomic bomb, developed after years of work by an international team including Germans, in the United States. These atomic bombings of Hiroshima and Nagasaki combined with a Soviet invasion of many of Japan's occupied territories in the east, led Japan to surrender.

After the war the U.S., Britain and the Soviet Union attempted to cooperate. German and Japanese military leaders responsible for atrocities in their regimes were put on trial and many were executed. The international organization the United Nations was created. Its goal was to prevent wars from breaking out as well as provide the people of the world with security, justice and rights. The period of post-war cooperation ended, however, when the Soviet Union rigged elections in the occupied nations of Central and Eastern Europe to allow for Communist victories. Soon, all of Eastern and much of Central Europe had become a series of Communist dictatorships, all staunchly allied with the Soviet Union. Germany following the war had been occupied by British, American, French, and Soviet forces. Unable to agree on a new government, the country was divided into a democratic west and Communist east. Berlin itself was also divided, with West Berlin becoming part of West Germany and East Berlin becoming part of East Germany. Meanwhile, the former Axis nations soon had their sovereignty restored, with Italy and Japan regaining independence following the war.

World War II had cost millions of lives and devastated many others. Entire cities lay in ruins and economies were in shambles. However, in the Allied countries, the people were filled with pride at having stopped Fascism from dominating the globe, and after the war, Fascism was all but extinct as an ideology. The world's balance of power also shifted, with the United States and Soviet Union being the world's two superpowers.

== Fall of the Western empires: 1945–1999 ==
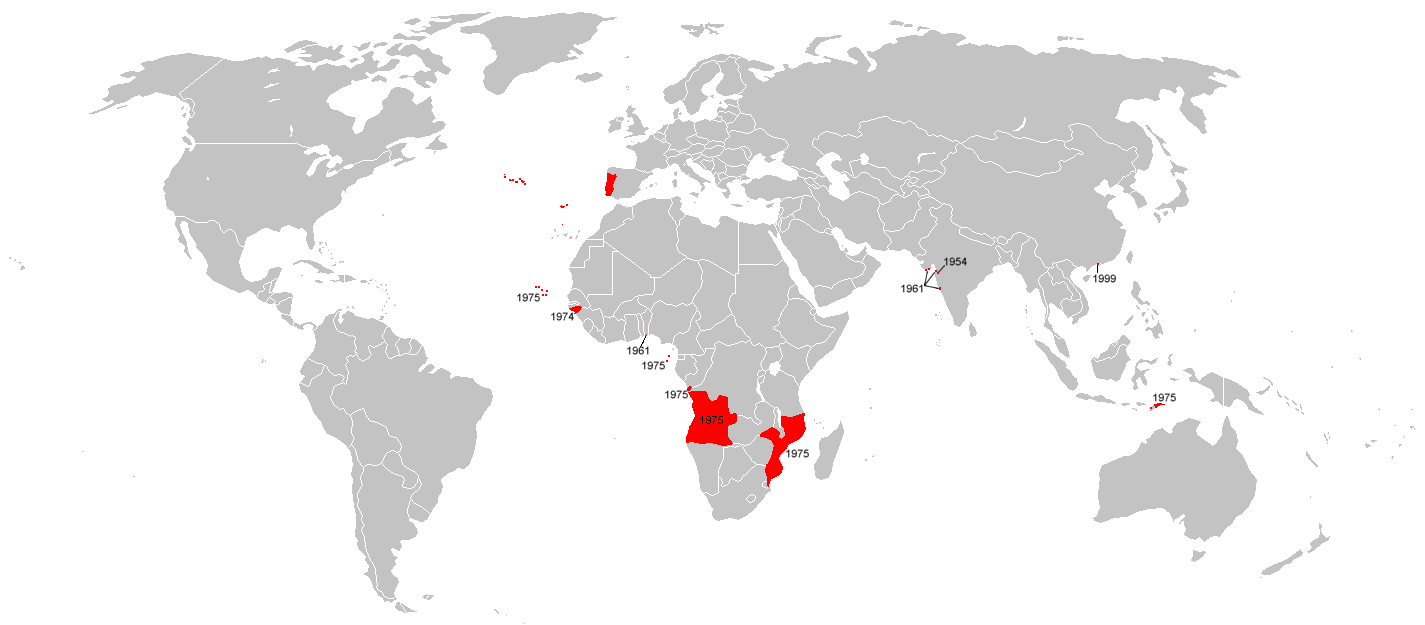
The Portuguese Empire in the 20th century. From origins in 1415, the Portuguese Empire became a Global Empire and lasted to the close of the 20th century, making it the longest lived of the modern European colonial empires.

Following World War II, the great colonial empires established by the Western powers beginning in early modern times began to collapse. There were several reasons for this. Firstly, World War II had devastated European economies and had forced governments to spend great deals of money, making the price of colonial administration increasingly hard to manage. Secondly, the two new superpowers following the war, the United States and Soviet Union were both opposed to imperialism, so the now weakened European empires could generally not look to the outside for help. Thirdly, Westerners increasingly were not interested in maintaining and even opposed the existence of empires. The fourth reason was the rise of independence movements following the war. The future leaders of these movements had often been educated at colonial schools run by Westerners where they adopted Western ideas like freedom, equality, self-determination and nationalism, and which turned them against their colonial rulers.

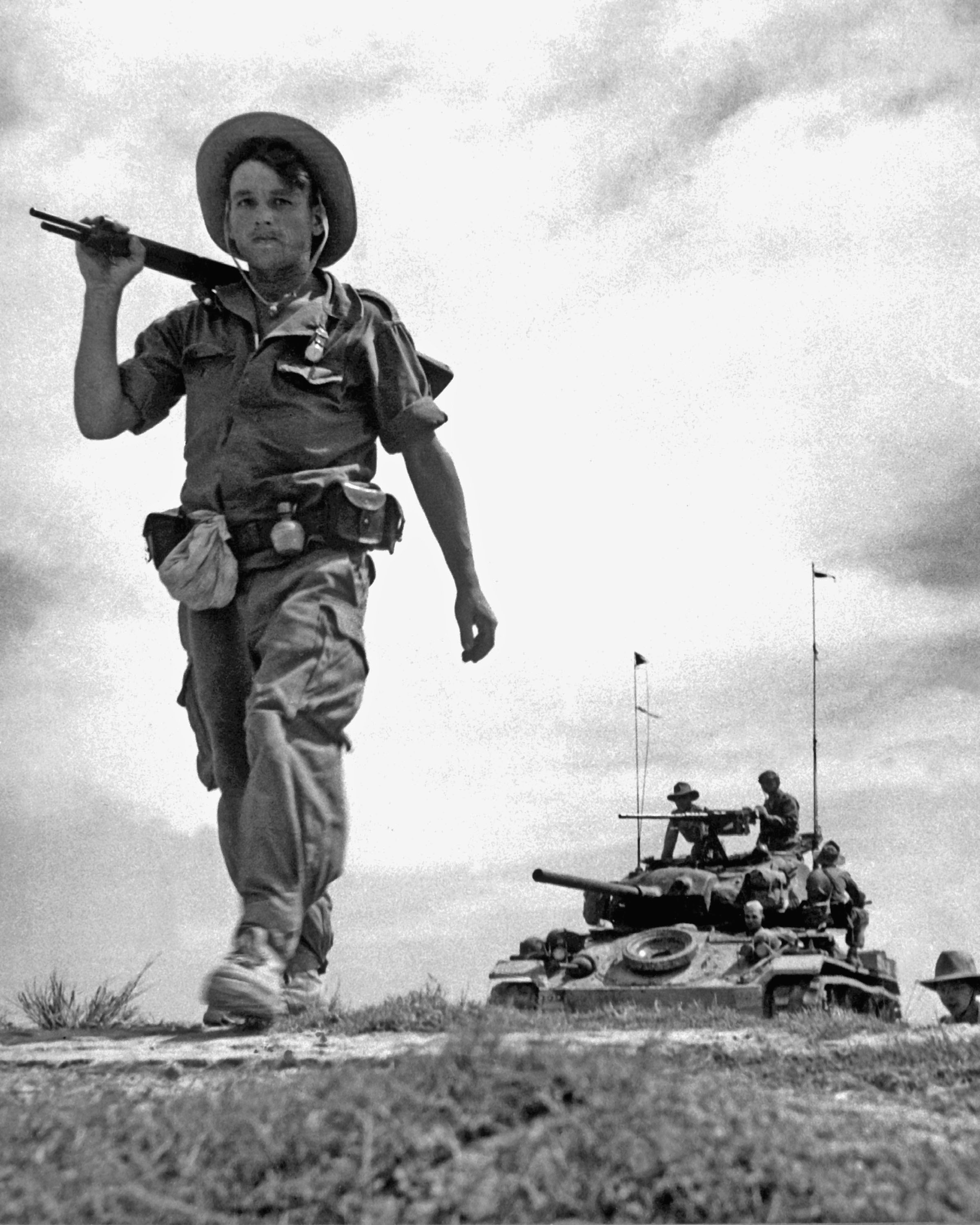
The French Foreign Legion on patrol during the First Indochina War, 1954.

The first colonies to gain independence were in Asia. In 1946, the U.S. granted independence to the Philippines, its only large overseas colony. In British India, Mahatma Gandhi led his followers in non-violent resistance to British rule. By the late 1940s Britain found itself unable to work with Indians in ruling the colony, this, combined with sympathy around the world for Gandhi's non-violent movement, led Britain to grant independence to India, dividing it into the largely Hindu country of India and the smaller, largely Muslim nation of Pakistan in 1947.

In 1948 Burma gained independence from Britain, and in 1945 Indonesian nationalists declared Indonesian independence, which the Netherlands recognised in 1949 after a four-year armed and diplomatic struggle. Independence for French Indochina came only after a great conflict. After the withdrawal of Japanese forces from the colony following World War II, France regained control but found it had to contend with an independence movement that had fought against the Japanese. The movement was led by the Vietnamese Ho Chi Minh, leader of the Vietnamese Communists. Because of this, the U.S. supplied France with arms and support, fearing Communists would dominate South-east Asia. In the end though, France gave in and granted independence, creating Laos, Cambodia, Communist North Vietnam, and South Vietnam.

In the Middle East, following World War II, Britain had granted independence to the formerly Ottoman territories of Mesopotamia, which became Iraq, Kuwait, and Transjordan, which became Jordan. France also granted independence to Syria and Lebanon. British Palestine, however, presented a unique challenge. Following World War I, when Britain gained the colony, Jewish and Arab national aspirations conflicted, followed by a proposal of the UN to divided Mandatory Palestine into a Jewish state and an Arab state. The Arabs objected, Britain withdrew and the Zionists declared the state of Israel on 14 May 1948.

The other major center of colonial power, Africa, was freed from colonial rule following World War II as well. Egypt gained independence from Britain and this was soon followed by Ghana and Tunisia. One violent independence movement of the time was fought in Algeria, in which Algerian rebels went so far as to kill innocent Frenchmen. In 1962, however, Algeria gained independence from France. By the 1970s the entire continent had become independent of European rule, although a few southern countries remained under the rule of white colonial minorities.

By the close of the 20th century, the European colonial Empires had ceased to exist as significant global entities. Sunset for the British Empire came when Britain's lease on the great trading port of Hong Kong was brought to end, and political control was transferred to the People's Republic of China in 1997. Soon after, in 1999, the transfer of sovereignty over Macau was concluded between Portugal and China, bringing to a close six centuries of Portuguese colonialism. Britain remained culturally linked to its former empire through the voluntary association of the Commonwealth of Nations, and 14 British Overseas Territories remained (formerly known as Crown colonies), consisting mainly of scattered island outposts. Currently, 15 independent Commonwealth realms retain the British monarch as their head of state. Canada, Australia and New Zealand emerged as vibrant and prosperous migrant nations. The once vast French colonial empire had lost its major possessions though a scattered territories remained as Overseas departments and territories of France. The shrunken Dutch Empire retained a few Caribbean islands as constituent countries of the Kingdom of the Netherlands. Spain had lost its overseas possessions, but its legacy was vast – with Latin culture remaining throughout South and Central America. Along with Portugal and France, Spain had made Catholicism a global religion.

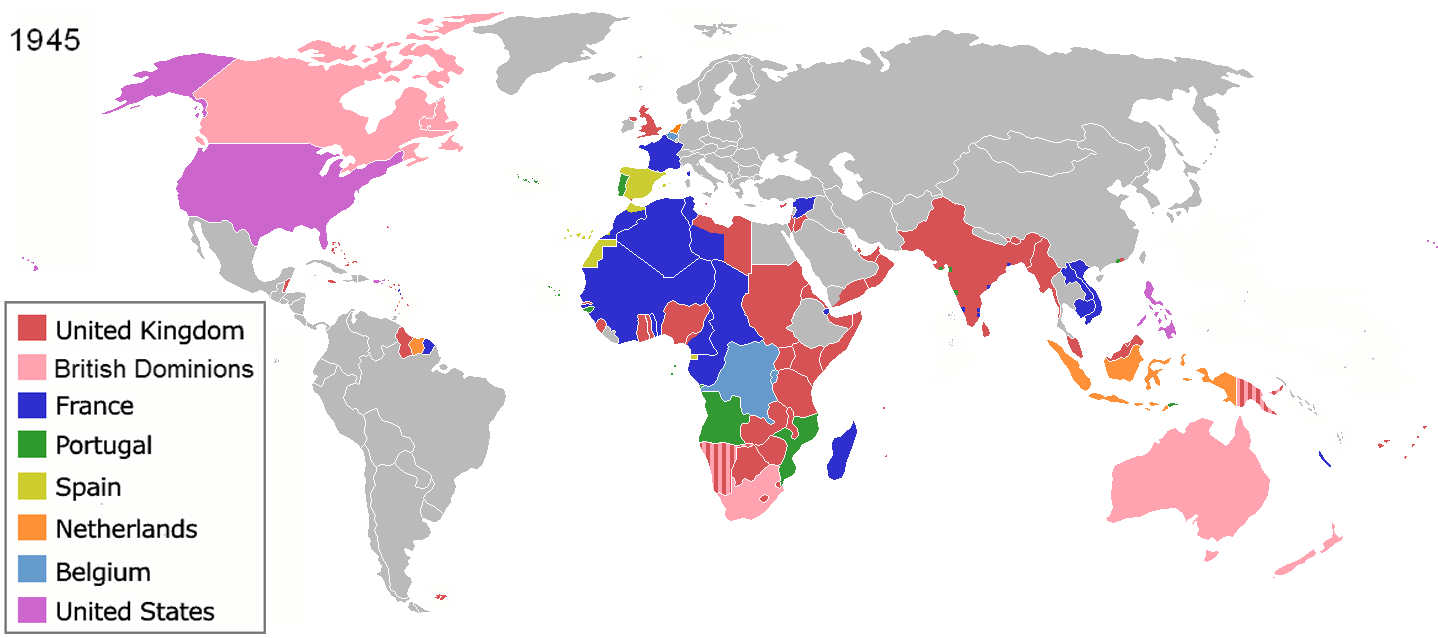
Western European colonial empires in Asia and Africa all collapsed in the years after 1945

Of Europe's empires, only the Russian Empire remained a significant geo-political force into the late 20th century, having morphed into the Soviet Union and Warsaw Pact, which, drawing on the writings of the German Karl Marx, established a socialist economic model under Communist dictatorship, which ultimately collapsed in the early 1990s. Adaptations of Marxism continued as the stated inspiration for Governments in Central America and Asia into the 21st century – though only a handful survived the end of the Cold War.

The end of the Western Empires greatly changed the world. Although many newly independent nations attempted to become democracies, many slipped into military and autocratic rule. Amid power vacuums and newly determined national borders, civil war also became a problem, especially in Africa, where the introduction of firearms to ancient tribal rivalries exacerbated problems.

The loss of overseas colonies partly also led many Western nations, particularly in continental Europe, to focus more on European, rather than global, politics as the European Union rose as an important entity. Though gone, the colonial empires left a formidable cultural and political legacy, with English, French, Spanish, Portuguese, Russian and Dutch being spoken by peoples across far flung corners of the globe. European technologies were now global technologies – religions like Catholicism and Anglicanism, founded in the West, were booming in post colonial Africa and Asia. Parliamentary (or presidential) democracies, as well as rival Communist style one party states invented in the West had replaced traditional monarchies and tribal government models across the globe. Modernity, for many, was equated with Westernisation.

== Cold War: 1945–1991 ==
Spheres of influence between the Western world and the Soviet Union during the Cold War.

From the end of World War II almost until the start of the 21st century, Western and world politics were dominated by the state of tensions and conflict between the world's two superpowers, the United States and the Soviet Union. In the years following World War II, the Soviets established satellite states throughout Central and Eastern Europe, including historically and culturally Western nations like Poland and Hungary. Following the division of Germany, the East Germans constructed the Berlin Wall, to prevent East Berliners from escaping to the "freedom" of West Berlin. The Berlin Wall would come to represent the Cold War around the world.

Rather than revert to isolationism, the United States took an active role in global politics following World War II to halt Communist expansion. After the war, Communist parties in Western Europe increased in prestige and number, especially in Italy and France, leading many to fear the whole of Europe would become Communist. The U.S. responded to this with the Marshall Plan, in which the U.S. financed the rebuilding of Western Europe and poured money into its economy. The Plan was a huge success and soon Europe was prosperous again, with many Europeans enjoying a standard of living close that in the U.S. (following World War II, the U.S. became very prosperous and Americans enjoyed the highest standard of living in the world). National rivalries ended in Europe and most Germans and Italians, for example, were happy to be living under democratic rule, regretting their Fascist pasts. In 1949, the North Atlantic Treaty was signed, creating the North Atlantic Treaty Organization, or NATO. The treaty was signed by the United States, Canada, the Low Countries, Norway, Denmark, Iceland, Portugal, Italy, France, and Britain. NATO members agreed that if any one of them were attacked, they would all consider themselves attacked and retaliate. NATO would expand as the years went on, other nations joined, including Greece, Turkey, and West Germany. The Soviets responded with the Warsaw Pact, an alliance which bound Central and Eastern Europe to fight with the United States and its allies in the event of war.

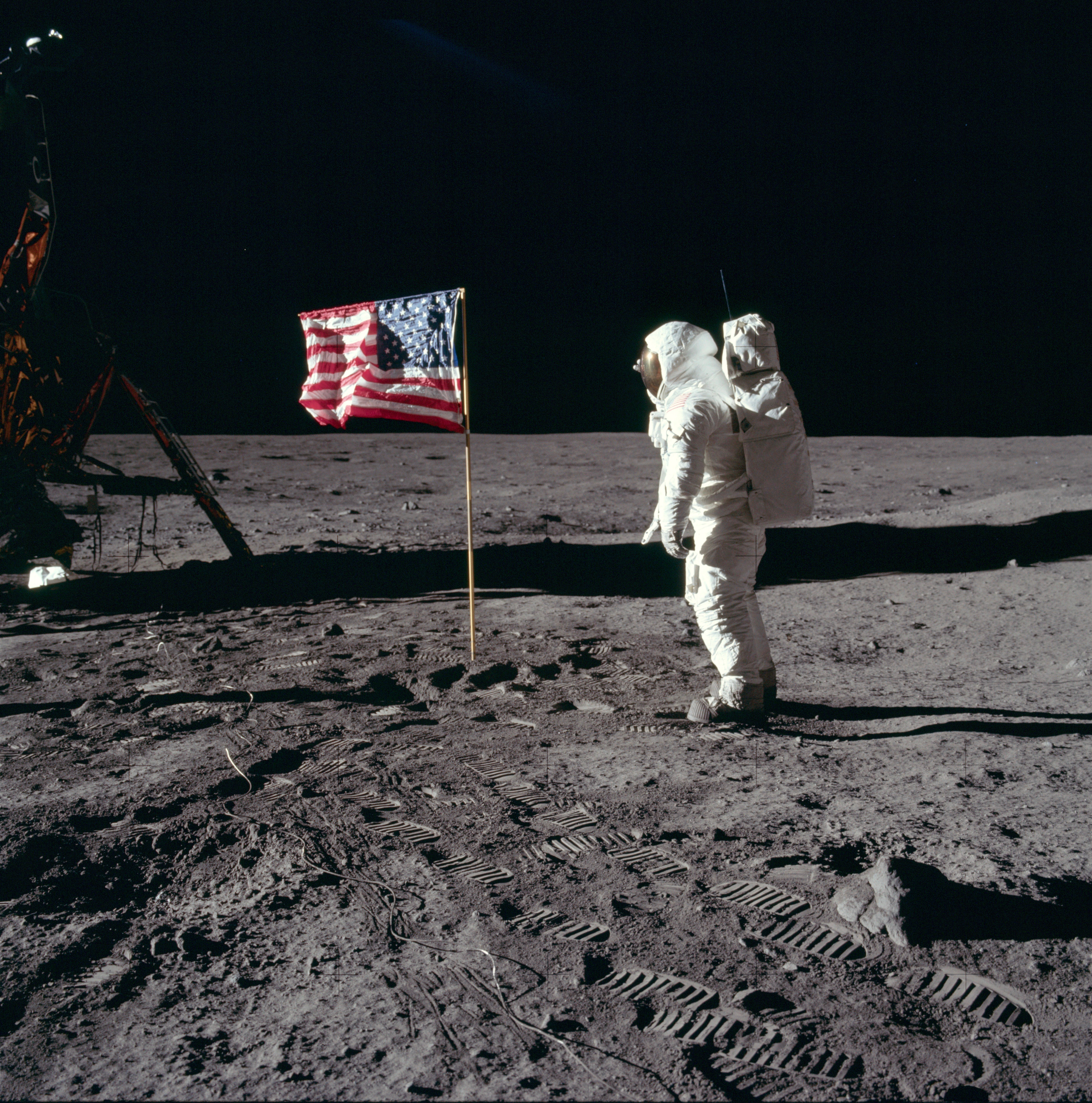
The United States reached the moon in 1969—a symbolic milestone in the space race.

One of the first actual conflicts of the Cold War took place in China. Following the withdrawal of Japanese troops after World War II, China was plunged into civil war, pitting Chinese Communists against Nationalists, who opposed Communism. The Soviets supported the Communists while the Americans supported the Nationalists. In 1949, the Communists were victorious, proclaiming the People's Republic of China. However, the Nationalists continued to rule the island of Taiwan off the coast. With American guarantees of protection for Taiwan, China did not make an attempt to take over the island. A major political change in East Asia in this period was Japan's becoming a tolerant, democratic society and an ally of the United States. In 1950, another conflict broke out in Asia, this time in Korea.

The peninsula had been divided between a Communist North and non-Communist South in 1948 following the withdrawal of American and Soviet troops. In 1950, the North Koreans invaded South Korea, wanting to united the land under Communism. The UN condemned the action, and, because the Soviets were boycotting the organization at the time and therefore had no influence on it, the UN sent forces to liberate South Korea. Many nations sent troops, but most were from America. UN forces were able to liberate the South and even attempted to conquer the North. However, fearing the loss of North Korea, Communist China sent troops to the North. The U.S. did not retaliate against China, fearing war with the Soviet Union, so the war stalemated. In 1953 the two sides agreed to a return to the pre-war borders and a de-militarization of the border area.

The world lived in the constant fear of World War III in the Cold War. Seemingly any conflict involving Communism might lead to a conflict between the Warsaw pact countries and the NATO countries. The prospect of a third world war was made even more frightening by the fact that it would almost certainly be a nuclear war. In 1949 the Soviets developed their first atomic bomb, and soon both the United States and Soviet Union had enough to destroy the world several times over. With the development of missile technology, the stakes were raised as either country could launch weapons from great distances across the globe to their targets. Eventually, Britain, France, and China would also develop nuclear weapons. It is believed that Israel developed nuclear weapons as well.

One major event that nearly brought the world to the brink of war was the Cuban Missile Crisis. In the 1950s a revolution in Cuba had brought the only Communist regime in the Western Hemisphere to power. In 1962, the Soviets began constructing missile sites in Cuba and sending nuclear missiles. Because of its close proximity to the U.S., the U.S. demanded the Soviets withdraw missiles from Cuba. The U.S. and Soviet Union came very close to attacking one another, but in the end came to a secret agreement in which the NATO withdrew missiles in exchange for a Soviet withdrawal of missiles from Cuba.

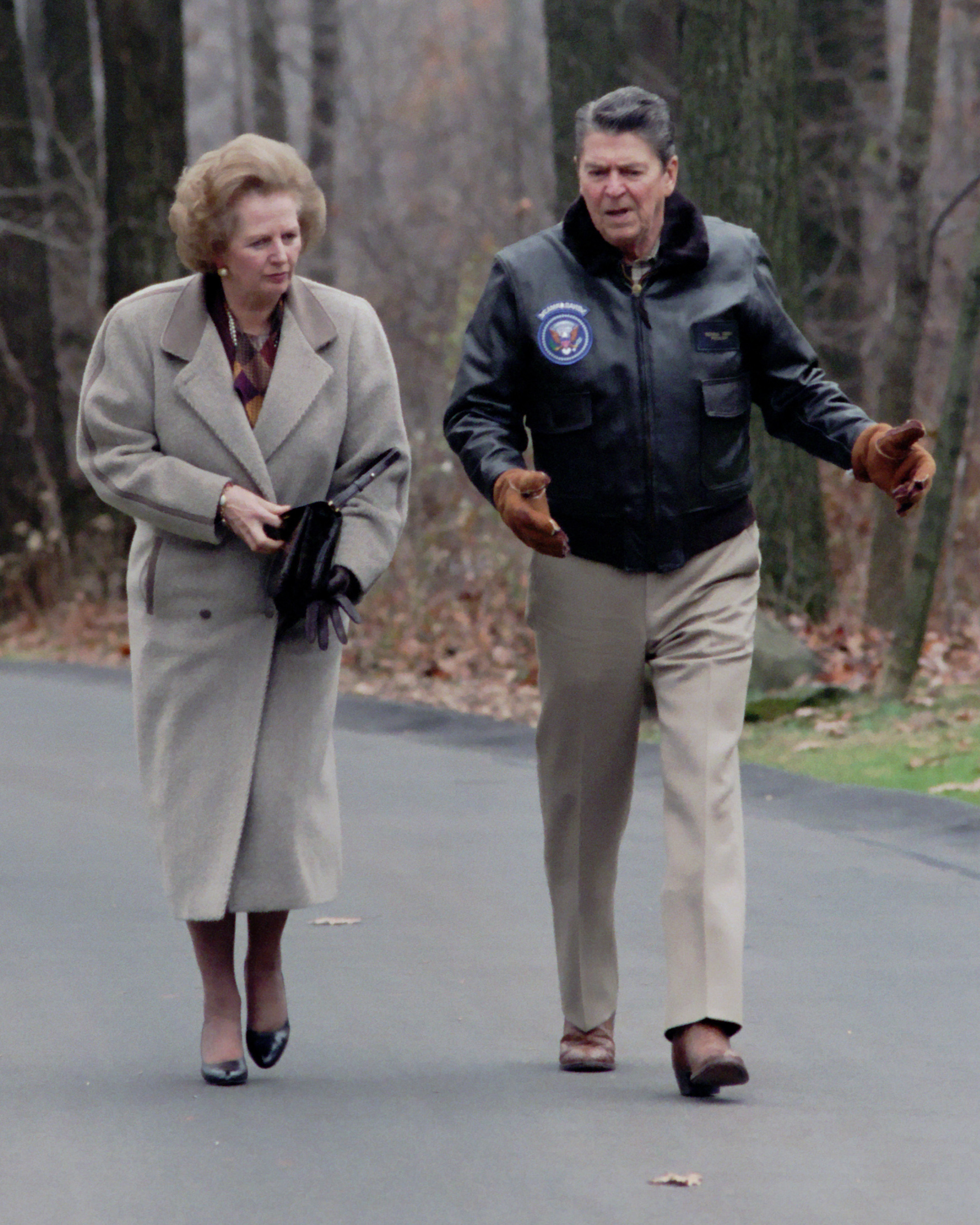
President Ronald Reagan and Prime Minister Margaret Thatcher at Camp David in 1986.

The next great Cold War conflict occurred in Southeast Asia. In the 1960s, North Vietnam invaded South Vietnam, hoping to unite all of Vietnam under Communist rule. The U.S. responded by supporting the South Vietnamese. In 1964, American troops were sent to "save" South Vietnam from conquest, which many Americans feared would lead to Communist dominance in the entire region. The Vietnam War lasted many years, but most Americans felt the North Vietnamese would be defeated in time. Despite American technological and military superiority, by 1968, the war showed no signs of ending and most Americans wanted U.S. forces to end their involvement. The U.S. undercut support for the North by getting the Soviets and Chinese to stop supporting North Vietnam, in exchange for recognition of the legitimacy of mainland China's Communist government, and began withdrawing troops from Vietnam. In 1972, the last American troops left Vietnam and in 1975 South Vietnam fell to the North. In the following years Communism took power in neighboring Laos and Cambodia.

By the 1970s global politics were becoming more complex. For example, France's president proclaimed France was a great power in and of itself. However, France did not seriously threaten the U.S. for supremacy in the world or even Western Europe. In the Communist world, there was also division, with the Soviets and Chinese differing over how Communist societies should be run. Soviet and Chinese troops even engaged in border skirmishes, although full-scale war never occurred.

The last great armed conflict of the Cold War took place in Afghanistan. In 1979, Soviet forces invaded that country, hoping to establish Communism. Muslims from throughout the Islamic World travelled to Afghanistan to defend that Muslim nation from conquest, calling it a Jihad, or Holy War. The U.S. supported the Jihadists and Afghan resisters, despite the fact that the Jihadists were vehemently anti-Western. By 1989 Soviet forces were forced to withdraw and Afghanistan fell into civil war, with an Islamic fundamentalist government, the Taliban taking over much of the country.

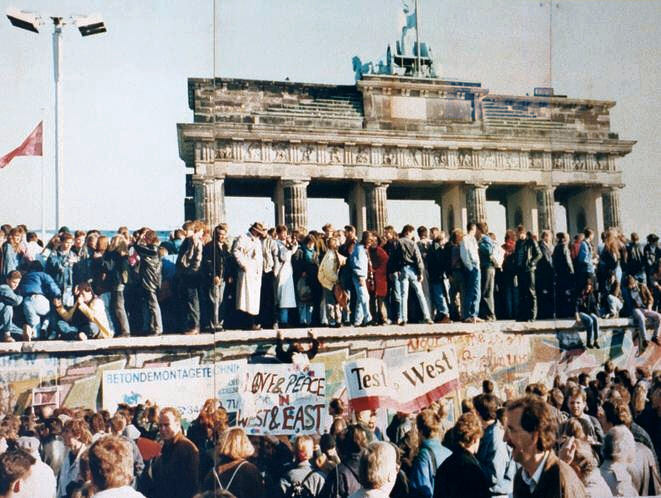
The Fall of the Berlin Wall brought an end to the Cold War.

The late 1970s had seen a lessening of tensions between the U.S. and Soviet Union, called Détente. However, by the 1980s Détente had ended with the invasion of Afghanistan. In 1981, Ronald Reagan became President of the United States and sought to defeat the USSR by leveraging the United States capitalist economic system to outproduce the communist Russians. The United States military was in a state of low moral after its loss in the Vietnam War, and President Reagan began a huge effort to out-produce the Soviets in military production and technology. In 1985, a new Soviet leader, Mikhail Gorbachev took power. Gorbachev, knowing that the Soviet Union could no longer compete economically with the United States, implemented a number of reforms granting his citizens freedom of speech and introducing some capitalist reforms. Gorbachev and America's staunch anti-Communist president Ronald Reagan were even able to negotiate treaties limiting each side's nuclear weapons. Gorbachev also ended the policy of imposing Communism in Central and Eastern Europe. In the past Soviet troops had crushed attempts at reform in places like Hungary and Czechoslovakia. Now, however, Eastern Europe was freed from Soviet domination.

=== Fall of communism (1989) ===
In Poland the Round Table Talks between the government and the Solidarity-led opposition led to semi-free elections in 1989. Elections in Poland where anti-communist candidates won a striking victory sparked off a succession of peaceful anti-communist revolutions in Central and Eastern Europe known as the Revolutions of 1989. Soon, Communist regimes throughout Europe collapsed.

In Germany, after calls from Reagan to Gorbachev to tear down the Berlin Wall, the people of East and West Berlin tore down the wall and East Germany's Communist government was voted out. East and West Germany unified to create the country of Germany, with its capital in the reunified Berlin. The changes in Central and Eastern Europe led to calls for reform in the Soviet Union itself. A failed coup by hard-liners led to greater instability in the Soviet Union, and the Soviet legislature, long subservient to the Communist Party, voted to abolish the Soviet Union in 1991. What had been the Soviet Union was divided into many republics. Although many slipped into authoritarianism, most became democracies. These new republics included Russia, Ukraine, and Kazakhstan. By the early 1990s, the West and Europe as a whole was finally free from Communism.

Following the end of the Cold War, Communism largely died out as a major political movement. After the fall of USSR, the United States became the world's only superpower.

== Western countries: 1945–1980 ==
=== United States: 1945–1980 ===
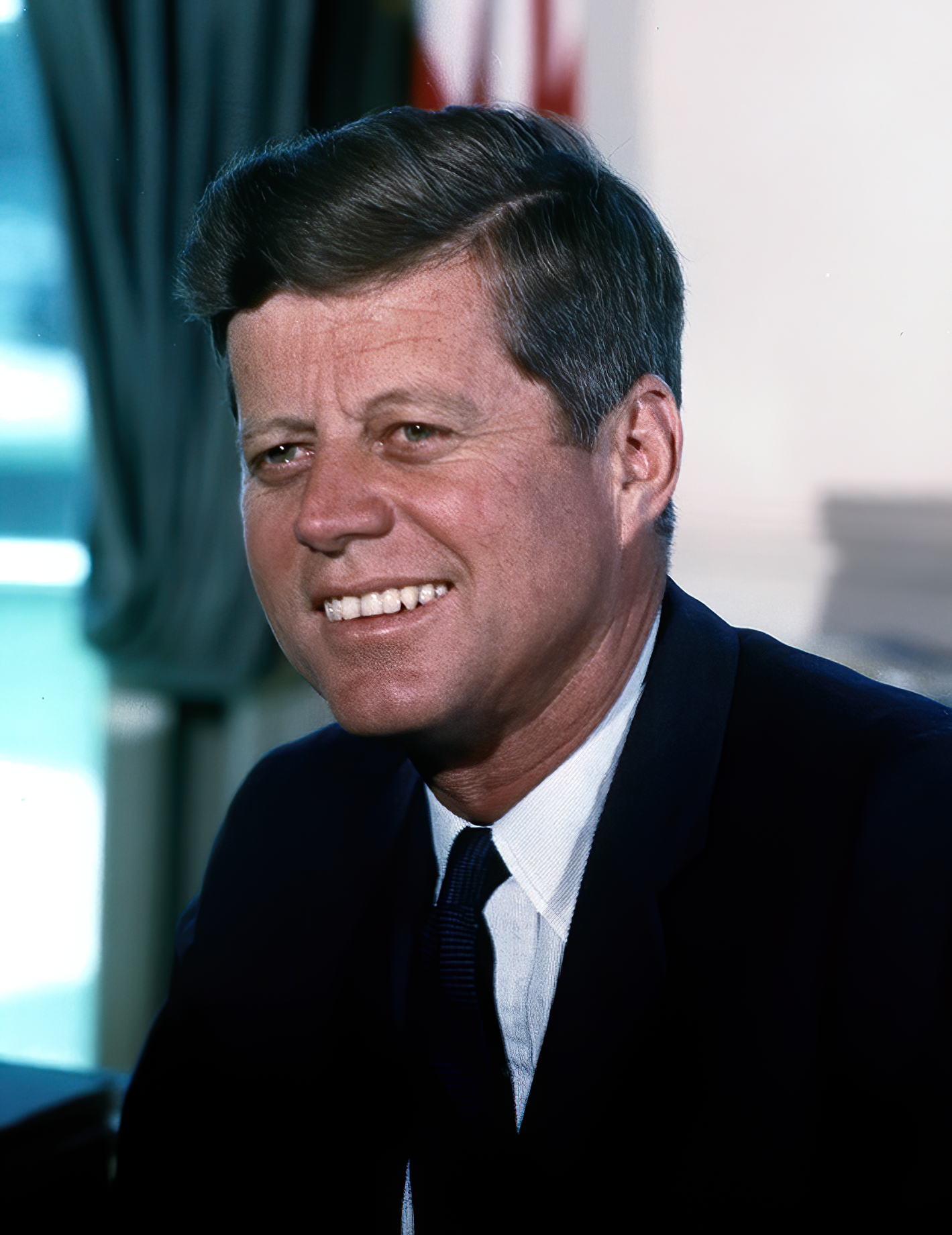
U.S. president John F. Kennedy

Following World War II, there was an unprecedented period of prosperity in the United States. The majority of Americans entered the middle class and moved from the cities into surrounding suburbs, buying homes of their own. Most American households owned at least one car, as well as the relatively new invention, the television. Also, the American population greatly increased as part of the so-called "baby boom" following the war. For the first time following the war, large of numbers of non-wealthy Americans were able to attend college.

Following the war, black Americans started what has become known as the civil rights movement in the United States. After roughly a century of second-class citizenship following the abolition of slavery, blacks began seeking full equality. This was helped by the 1954 decision by the Supreme Court, outlawing segregation in schools, which was common in the South. Martin Luther King Jr., a black minister from the South led many blacks and whites who supported their cause in non-violent protests against discrimination. Eventually, the Civil Rights Act and Voting Rights Act were passed in 1964, banning measures that had prevented blacks from voting and outlawing segregation and discrimination in the U.S.

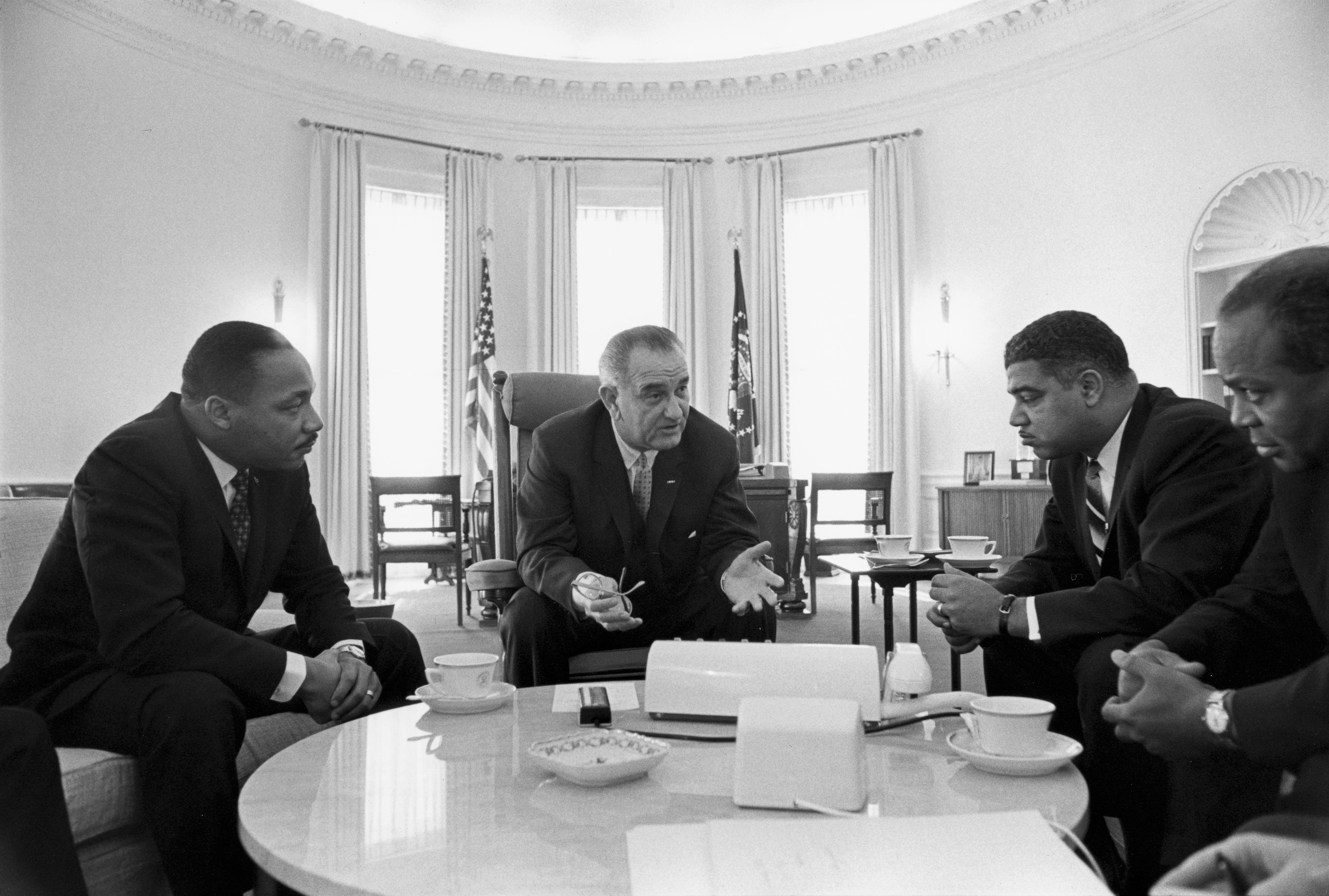
President Lyndon B. Johnson (centre) with Rev. Martin Luther King Jr. and other Civil Rights leaders in 1964.

In politics, the Democratic and Republican parties remained dominant. In 1945, the Democratic party relied on Southerners, whose support went back to the days when Democrats defended a state's right to own slaves, and Northeasterners and industrial Mid-Westerners, who supported the pro-labor and pro-immigrant policies of the Democrats. Republicans tended to rely on middle-class Protestants from elsewhere in the country. As the Democrats began championing civil rights, however, Southern Democrats felt betrayed, began voting Republican. Presidents from this period were Harry Truman, Dwight Eisenhower, John F. Kennedy, Lyndon Johnson, Richard Nixon, Gerald Ford, and Jimmy Carter. The years 1945–1980 saw the expansion of federal power and the establishment of programs to help the elderly and poor pay for medical expenses.

By 1980, many Americans had become pessimistic about their country. Despite its status as one of only two superpowers, the Vietnam War as well as the social upheavals of the 1960s and an economic downturn in the 1970s led America to become a much-less confident nation.

=== Europe ===
The formation of the European Union

At the close of the war, much of Europe lay in ruins with millions of homeless refugees. A souring of relations between the Western Allies and the Soviet Union then saw Europe split by an Iron Curtain, dividing the continent between West and East. In Western Europe, democracy had survived the challenge of Fascism and began a period of intense rivalry with Eastern Communism, which was to continue into the 1980s. France and Britain secured themselves permanent positions on the newly formed United Nations Security Council, but Western European empires did not long survive the war, and no one Western European nation would ever again be the paramount power in world affairs.

Despite these immense challenges however, Western Europe again rose as an economic and cultural powerhouse. Assisted first by the Marshall Plan of financial aid from the United States, and later through closer economic integration through the European Common Market, Western Europe quickly re-emerged as a global economic power house. The vanquished nations of Italy and West Germany became leading economies and allies of the United States. So marked was their recovery that historians refer to an Italian economic miracle and in the case of West Germany and Austria the Wirtschaftswunder (German for "economic miracle").

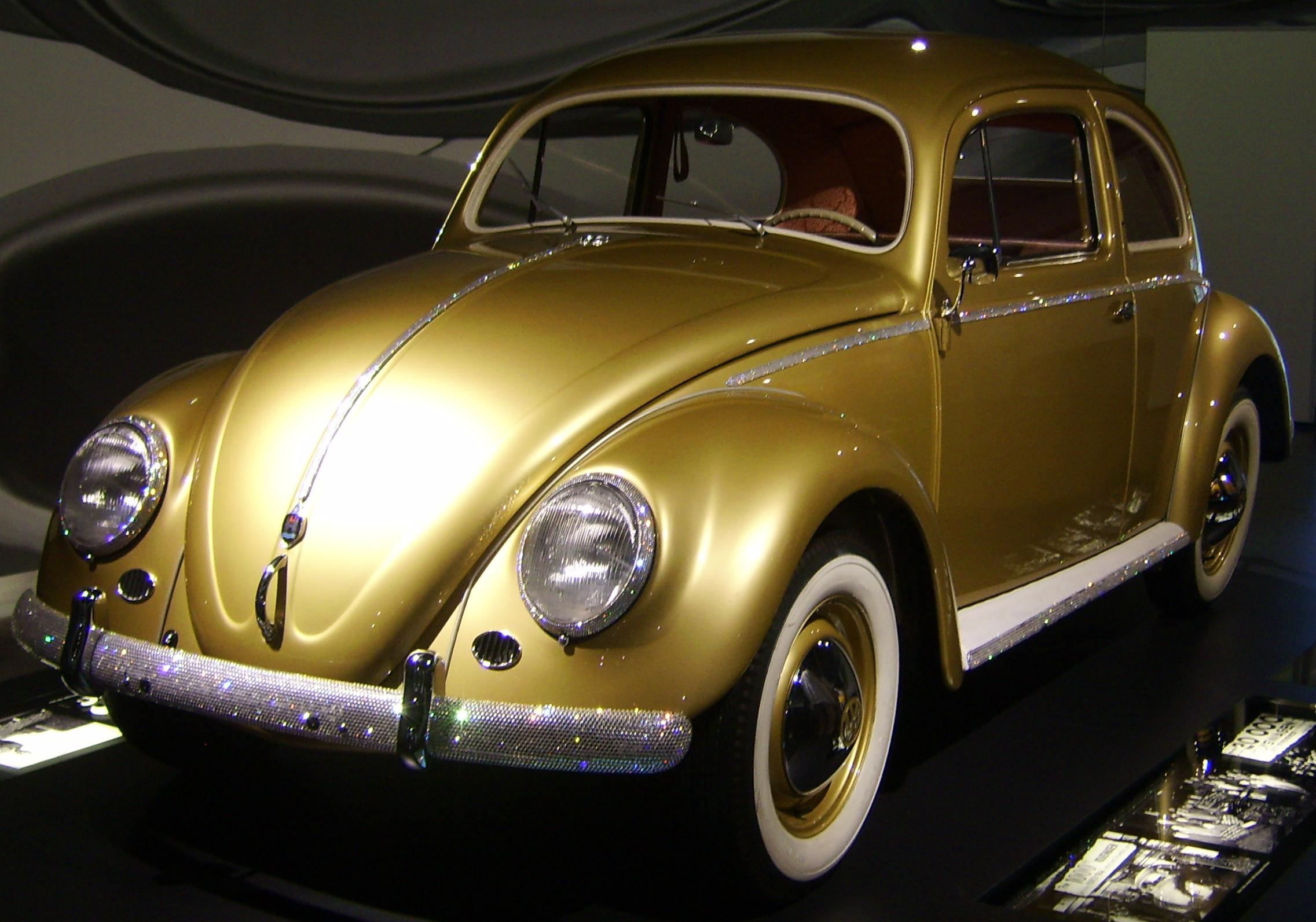
The Volkswagen Beetle was an icon of West German reconstruction, the Wirtschaftswunder, or "economic miracle".

Facing a new power balance between the Soviet East and American West, Western European nations moved closer together. In 1957, Belgium, France, the Netherlands, West Germany, Italy and Luxembourg signed the landmark Treaty of Rome, creating the European Economic Community, free of customs duties and tariffs, and allowing the rise of a new European geo-political force. Eventually, this organization was renamed the European Union or (EU), and many other nations joined, including Britain, Ireland, and Denmark. The EU worked toward economic and political cooperation among European nations.

Between 1945 and 1980, Europe became increasingly socialist. Most European countries became welfare states, in which governments provided a large number of services to their people through taxation. By 1980, most of Europe had universal health care and pensions for the elderly. The unemployed were also guaranteed income from the government, and European workers were guaranteed long vacation time. Many other entitlements were established, leading many Europeans to enjoy a very high standard of living. By the 1980s, however, the economic problems of the welfare state were beginning to emerge.

Europe had many important political leaders during this time. Charles de Gaulle, leader of the French government in exile during World War II, served as France's president for many years. He sought to carve out for France a great power status in the world.

Although Europe as a whole was relatively peaceful in this period, both Britain and Spain suffered from acts of terrorism. In Britain, The Troubles saw Irish republicans battle Unionists loyal to Britain. In Spain, ETA, a Basque separatist group, began committing acts of terror against Spaniards, hoping to gain independence for the Basques, an ethnic minority in north-eastern Spain. Both these terrorist campaigns failed, however.

For Greece, Spain and Portugal, ideological battles between left and right continued and the emergence of parliamentary democracy was troubled. Greece experienced Civil War, coup and counter-coup into the 1970s. Portugal, since the 1930s under a quasi-Fascist regime and among the poorest nations in Europe, fought a rearguard action against independence movements in its empire, until a 1974 coup. The last authoritarian dictatorship in Western Europe fell in 1975, when Francisco Franco, dictator of Spain, died. Franco had helped to modernize the country and improve the economy. His successor, King Juan Carlos, transformed the country into a constitutional monarchy. By 1980, all Western European nations were democracies.

=== British Empire and Commonwealth 1945–1980 ===
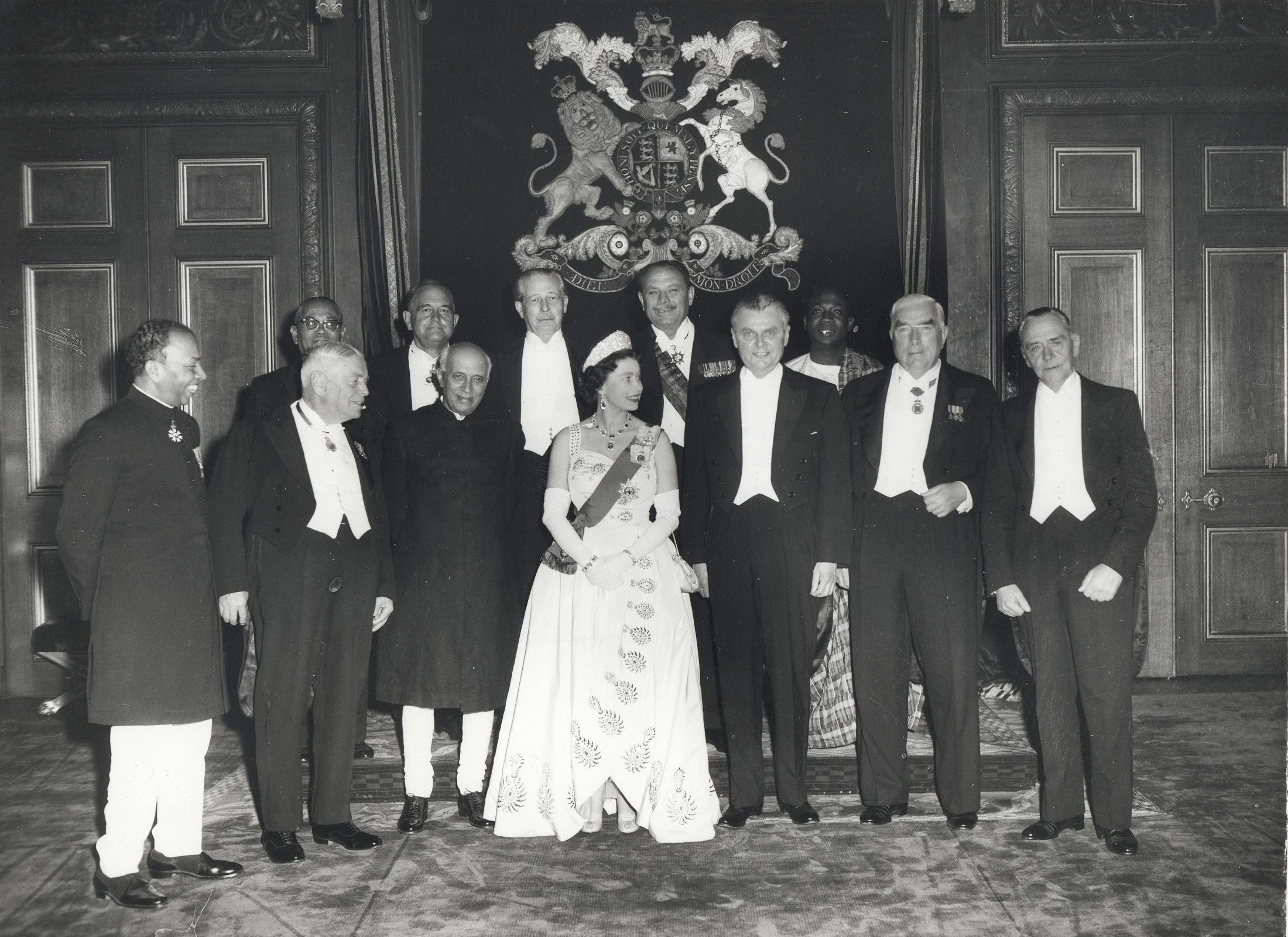
Queen Elizabeth II and Commonwealth leaders, at the 1960 Commonwealth Prime Ministers' Conference, Windsor Castle.

Between 1945 and 1980, the British Empire was transformed from its centuries old position as a global colonial power, to a voluntary association known as the Commonwealth of Nations – only some of which retained any formal political links to Britain or its monarchy. Some former British colonies or protectorates disassociated themselves entirely from Britain.

==== Britain ====
The popular war time leader Winston Churchill was swept from office at the 1945 election and the Labour Government of Clement Attlee introduced a program of nationalisation of industry and introduced wide-ranging social welfare. Britain's finances had been ravaged by the war and John Maynard Keynes was sent to Washington to negotiate the massive Anglo-American loan on which Britain relied to fund its post-war reconstruction.

India was granted Independence in 1947 and Britain's global influence rapidly declined as decolonisation proceeded. Though the USSR and United States now stood as the post war super powers, Britain and France launched the ill-fated Suez intervention in the 1950s, and Britain committed to the Korean War.

From the 1960s The Troubles afflicted Northern Ireland, as British Unionist and Irish Republican paramilitaries conducted campaigns of violence in support of their political goals. The conflict at times spilled into Ireland and England and continental Europe. Paramilitaries such as the IRA (Irish Republican Army) wanted union with the Republic of Ireland while the UDA (Ulster Defence Association) were supporters of Northern Ireland remaining within the United Kingdom.

In 1973, Britain entered the European Common Market, stepping away from imperial and commonwealth trade ties. Inflation and unemployment contributed to a growing sense of economic decline – partly offset by the exploitation of North Sea Oil from 1974. In 1979, the electorate turned to Conservative Party leader Margaret Thatcher, who became Britain's first female prime minister. Thatcher launched a radical program of economic reform and remained in power for over a decade. In 1982, Thatcher dispatched a British fleet to the Falkland Islands which successfully repelled an Argentine invasion of the British Territory, demonstrating that Britain could still project power across the globe.

==== Canada ====
Canada continued to evolve its own national identity in the post-war period. Although it was an independent nation, it remained part of the British Commonwealth and recognized the British monarch as the Canadian monarch as well. Following the war, French and English were recognized as co-equal official languages in Canada, and French became the only official language in the French-speaking province of Quebec. Referendums were held in both 1980 and 1995 in which Quebecers, however, voted not to secede from the union. Other cultural changes Canada faced were similar to those in the United States. Racism and discrimination largely disappeared in the post-war years, and dual-income families became the norm. Also, there was a rejection of traditional Western values by many in Canada. The government also established universal health care for its citizens following the war.

==== Australia and New Zealand: 1945–1980 ====
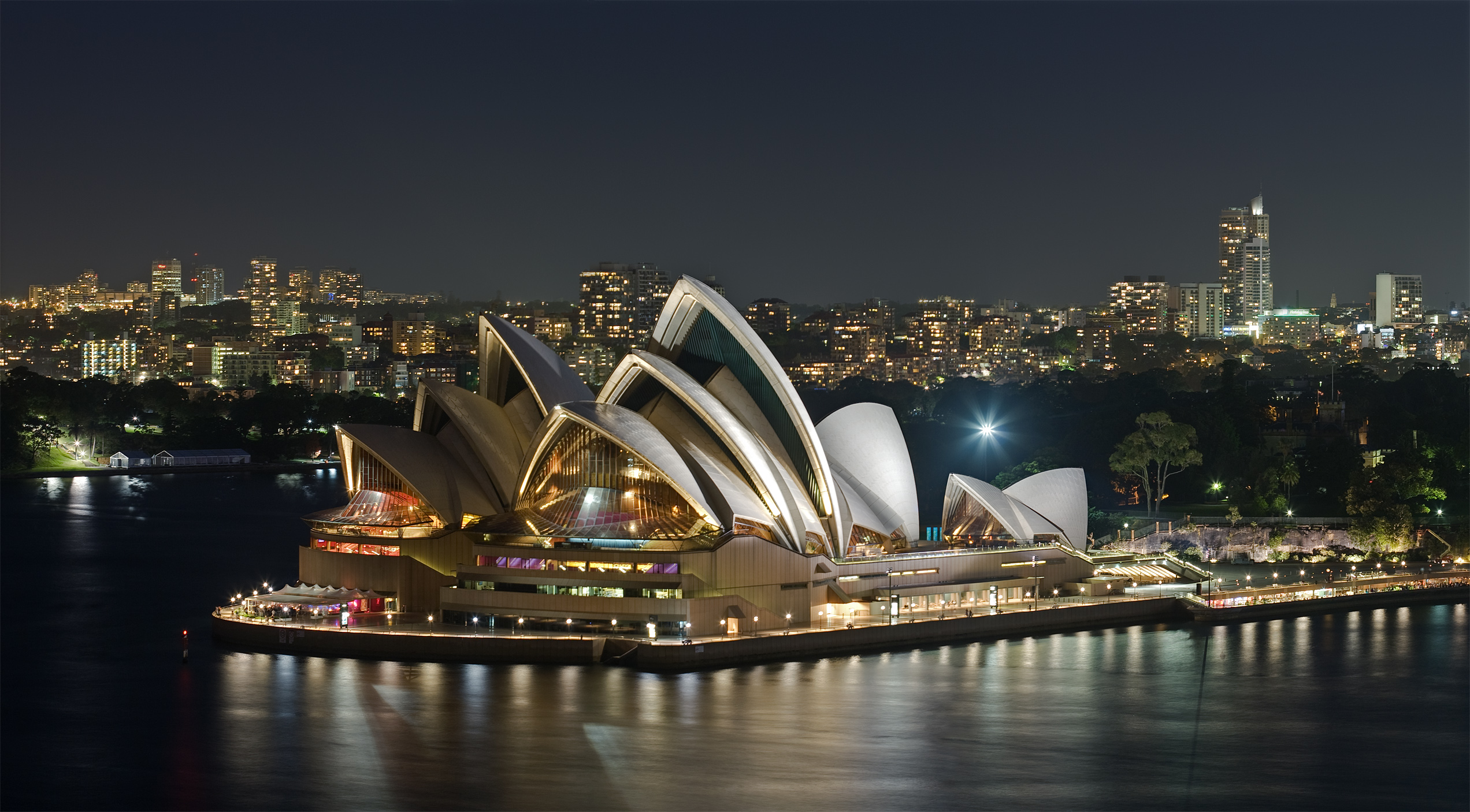
The Sydney Opera House opened in 1973

Following World War II, Australia and New Zealand enjoyed a great deal of prosperity along with the rest of the West. Both countries remained constitutional monarchies within the evolving Commonwealth of Nations and continued to recognise British monarchs as head of their own independent Parliaments. However, following British defeats by the Japanese in World War II, the post-war decline of the British Empire, and entry of Britain into the European Economic Community in 1973, the two nations re-calibrated defence and trade relations with the rest of the world.

Following the Fall of Singapore in 1941, Australia turned to the United States for military aid against the Japanese Empire and Australia and New Zealand joined the United States in the ANZUS military alliance in the early 1950s and contributed troops to anti-communist conflicts in South-East Asia in the 1950s, 1960s and 1970s. The two nations also established multicultural immigration programs with waves of economic and refugee migrants establishing bases for large Southern European, East Asian, Middle Eastern, and South Pacific islander communities. Trade integration with Asia expanded, particularly through good post-war relations with Japan.

The Maori and Aboriginal Australians had been largely dispossessed and disenfranchised during the 19th and early 20th centuries, but relations between the descendants of European settlers and the Indigenous peoples of Australia and New Zealand began to improve through legislative and social reform over the post-war period corresponding with the civil rights movement in North America. The Fraser government became a vocal critic of white-minority rule in Apartheid South Africa and Rhodesia, concluding the Gleaeagles Agreement in 1977.

The arts also diversified and flourished over the period – with Australian cinema, literature and musical artists expanding their nation's profile internationally. The iconic Sydney Opera House opened in 1973 and Australian Aboriginal Art began to find international recognition and influence.

=== Western culture: 1945–1980 ===
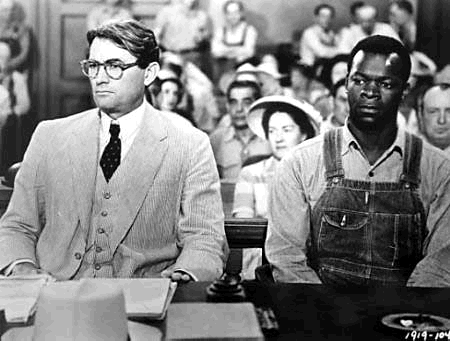
Scene from the 1962 film To Kill a Mockingbird. American cinema was one of the most influential artforms of the post-war period.

The Beatles were a highly successful and innovative British rock and roll band.

The West went through a series of great cultural and social changes between 1945 and 1980. Mass media created a global culture that could ignore national frontiers. Literacy became almost universal, encouraging the growth of books, magazines and newspapers. The influence of cinema and radio remained, while televisions became near essentials in every home. A new pop culture also emerged with rock n roll and pop stars at its heart.

Religious observance declined in most of the West. Protestant churches also began focusing more on social gospel rather than doctrine, and the ecumenical movement, which supported co-operation among Christian Churches. The Catholic Church changed many of its practices in the Second Vatican Council, including allowing masses to be said in the vernacular rather than Latin. The counterculture of the 1960s (and early 1970s) began in the United States as a reaction against the conservative government, social norms of the 1950s, the political conservatism (and perceived social repression) of the Cold War period, and the US government's extensive military intervention in Vietnam.

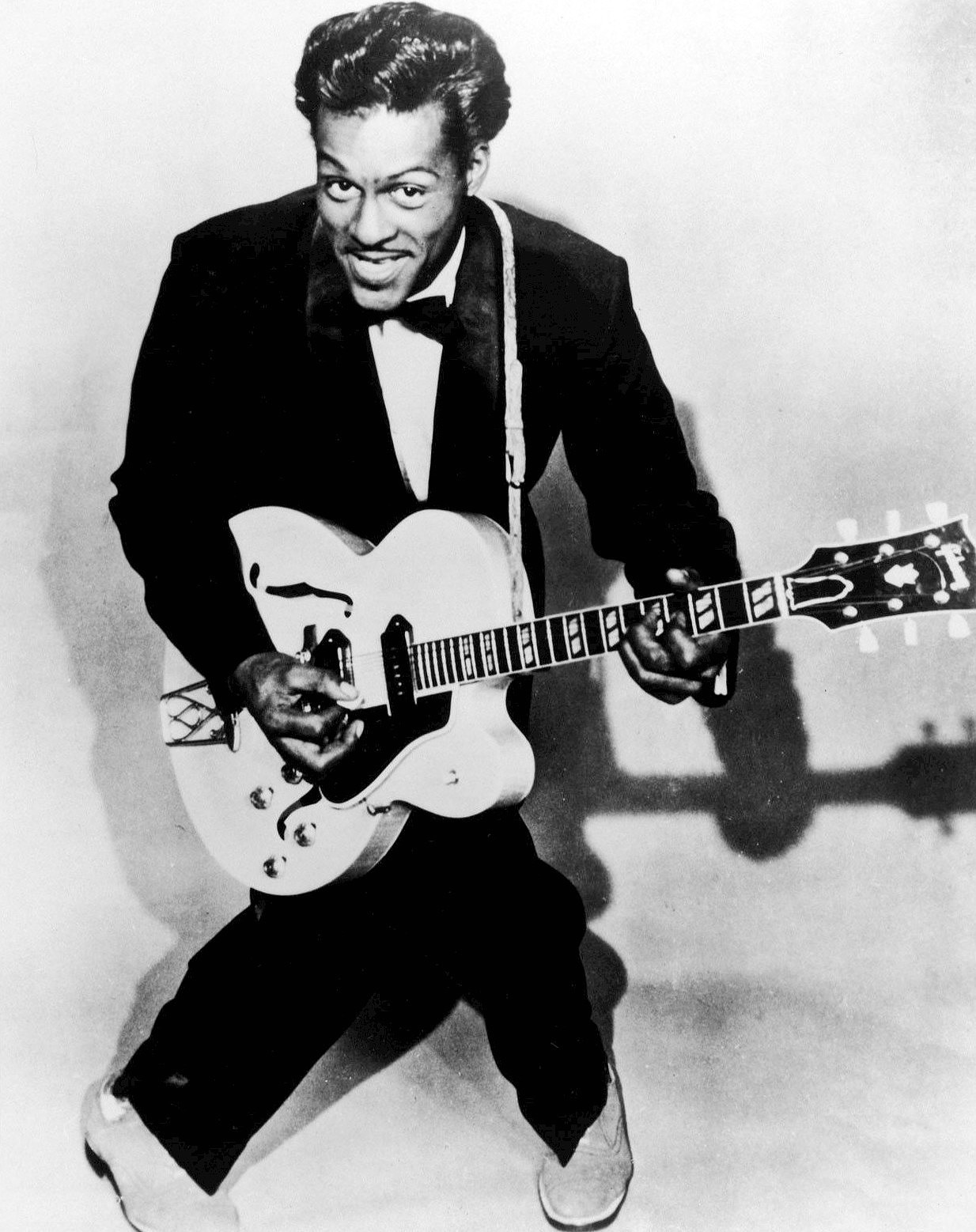
Chuck Berry was nicknamed: "The father of rock and roll".

With the abolition of laws treating most non-whites as second-class citizens, overt institutional racism largely disappeared from the West.

Although the United States failed to secure the legal equality of women with men (by the failure of Congress to ratify the Equal Rights Amendment), women continued working outside the home, and by 1980 the double-income family became commonplace in Western society. Beginning in the 1960s, many began rejecting traditional Western values and there was a decline in emphasis on church and the family.

Rock and roll music and the spread of technological innovations such as television dramatically altered the cultural landscape of western civilisation. The influential artists of the 20th century often belonged to the new technology artforms.

Rock and roll emerged from the United States out of African-American music from the 1950s to become a quintessential 20th-century art form. Artists such as Chuck Berry and Little Richard developed the new genre in the United States. British rock and roll emerged later, with bands and artists like The Beatles, The Rolling Stones and Jimi Hendrix rising to unparalleled success during the 1960s. From Australia emerged the mega pop band The Bee Gees and hard rock band AC/DC, who carried the genre in new directions through the 1970s. These musical artists were icons of radical social changes which saw many traditional notions of western culture alter dramatically.

Hollywood, California became synonymous with film during the 20th century and American Cinema continued a period of immense global influence in the West after World War II. American cinema played a role in adjusting community attitudes through the 1940s to 1980 with seminal works like John Ford's 1956 Western The Searchers, starring John Wayne, providing a sympathetic view of the Native American experience; and 1962's To Kill a Mockingbird, based on the Pulitzer Prize-winning novel by Harper Lee and starring Gregory Peck, challenging racial prejudice. The advent of television challenged the status of cinema and the artform evolved dramatically from the 1940s through the age of glamorous icons like Marilyn Monroe and directors like Alfred Hitchcock to the emergence of such directors as Stanley Kubrick, George Lucas and Steven Spielberg, whose body of work reflected the emerging Space Age and immense technological and social change.

== Western nations: 1980–present ==
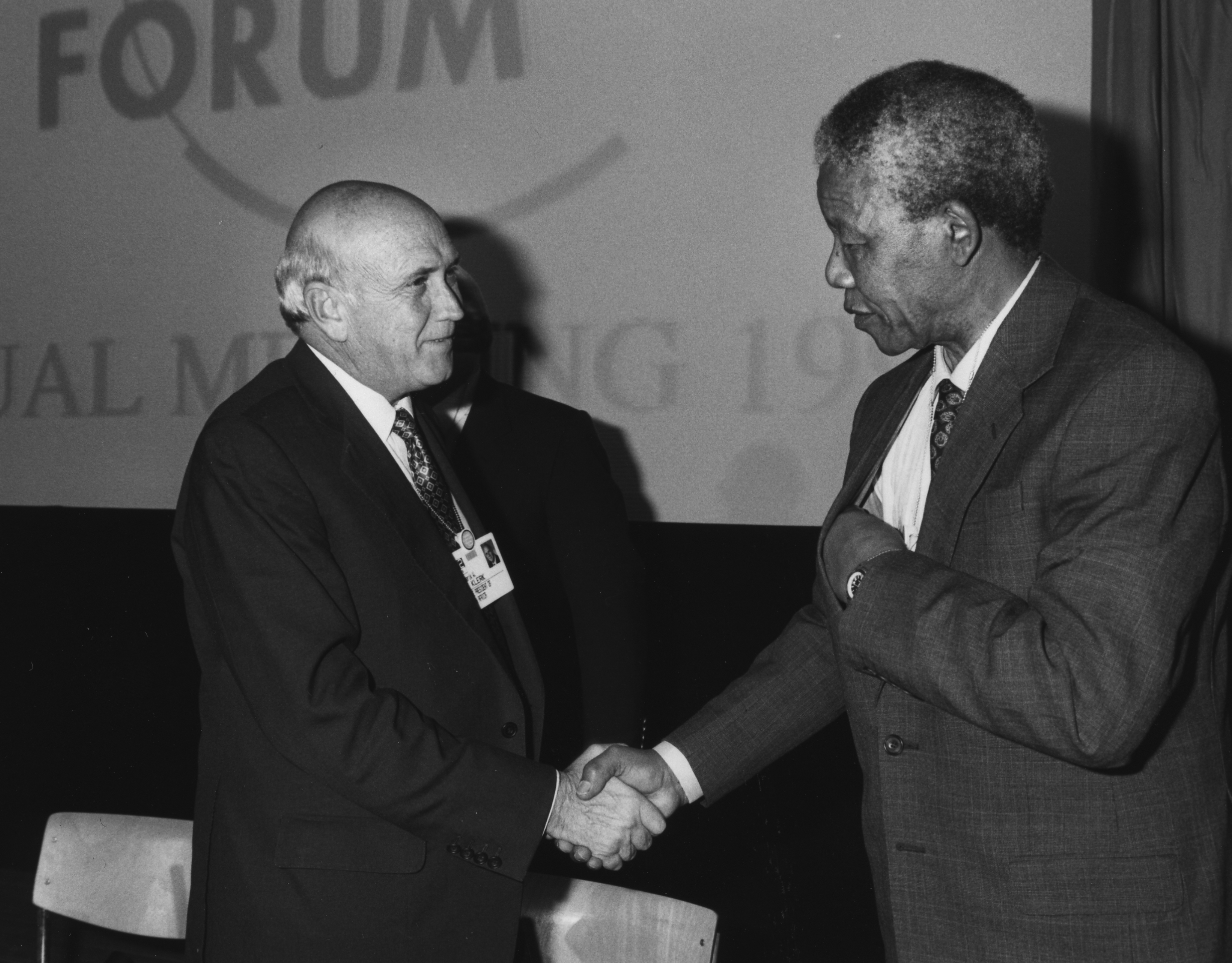
World Economic Forum, 1992: F. W. de Klerk (the last white minority president of South Africa) shakes hands with Nelson Mandela (who later became the first freely elected black president).

The 1980s were a period of economic growth in the West, though the 1987 Stock Market Crash saw much of the West enter the 1990s in a downturn. The 1990s and turn of the century in turn saw a period of prosperity throughout the West. The World Trade Organization was formed to assist in the organisation of world trade. Following the collapse of Soviet Communism, Central and Eastern Europe began a difficult readjustment towards market economies and parliamentary democracy. In the post Cold War environment, new co-operation emerged between the West and former rivals like Russia and China, but Islamism declared itself a mortal enemy of the West, and wars were launched in Afghanistan and the mid-East in response.

The economic cycle turned again with the Great Recession, but amidst a new economic paradigm, the effect on the West was uneven, with Europe and United States suffering deep recession, but Pacific economies like Australia and Canada, largely avoiding the downturn – benefitting from a combination of rising trade with Asia, good fiscal management and banking regulation. In the early 21st century, Brasil, Russia, India and China (the BRIC nations) were re-emerging as drivers of economic growth from outside North America and Western Europe.

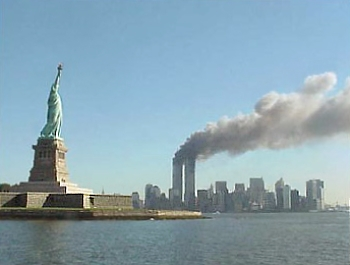
The 11 September attacks and the war on terrorism.

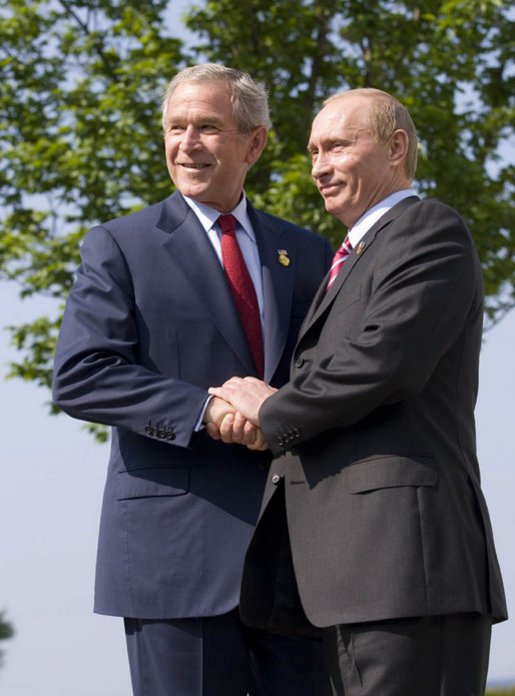
U.S. president George W. Bush and Russian president Vladimir Putin at the 33rd G8 summit, June 2007. The end of the Cold War allowed new co-operation between Russia and the West, but tensions remained.

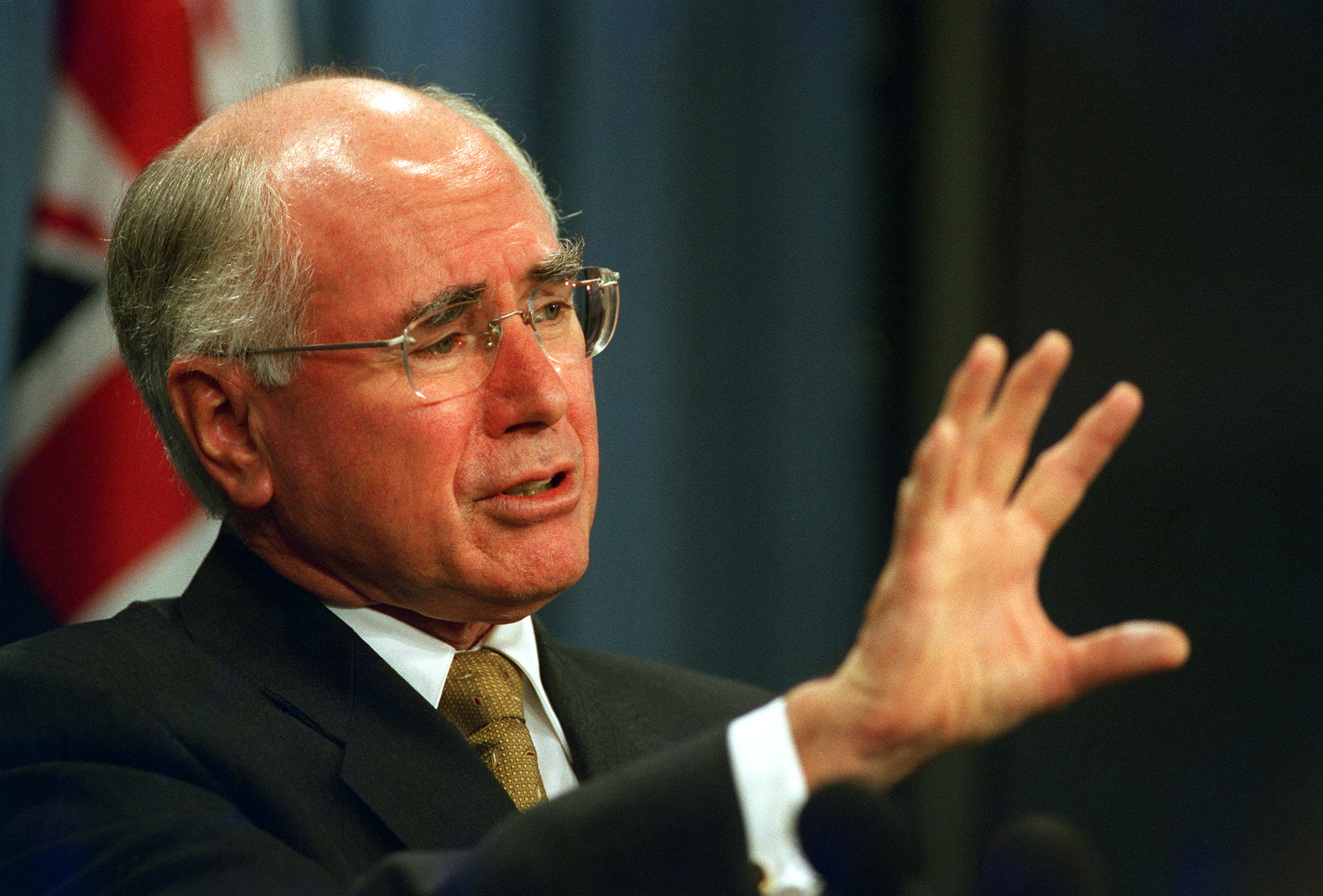
Australia's second longest-serving prime minister, John Howard. In the early 21st century, Australia stood as the best performing economy among Western nations amid continuing close ties to Europe and North America and booming trade with Asia.

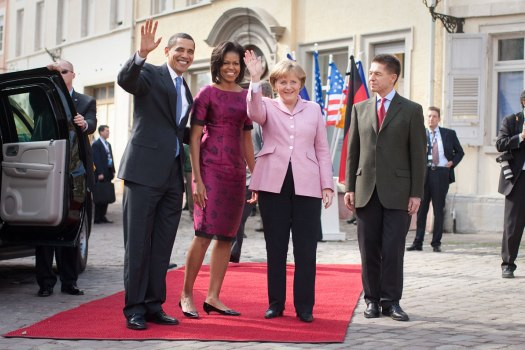
Rathaus in Baden-Baden, Germany, 2009: Barack Obama (the first African American president of the United States), and his wife are welcomed by Angela Merkel (the first woman chancellor of Germany) and her husband.

In the early stages after the Cold War, Russian president Boris Yeltsin stared down an attempted restoration of Sovietism in Russia, and pursued closer relations with the West. Amid economic turmoil a class of oligarchs emerged at the summit of the Russian economy. Yeltsin's chosen successor, the former spy, Vladimir Putin, tightened the reins on political opposition, opposed separatist movements within the Russian Federation, and battled pro-Western neighbour states like Georgia, contributing to a challenging climate of relations with Europe and America. Former Soviet satellites joined NATO and the European Union, leaving Russia again isolated in the East. Under Putin's long reign, the Russian economy profited from a resource boom in the global economy, and the political and economic instability of the Yeltsin era quickly became a thing of the past.

Elsewhere, both within and without the West, democracy and capitalism were in the ascendant – even Communist holdouts like mainland China and (to a lesser extent) Cuba and Vietnam, while retaining one party government, experimented with market liberalisation, a process which accelerated after the fall of European Communism, enabling the re-emergence of China as an alternative centre of economic and political power standing outside the West.

Free trade agreements were signed by many countries. The European nations broke down trade barriers with one another in the EU, and the United States, Canada, and Mexico signed the North American Free Trade Agreement (NAFTA). Although free trade has helped businesses and consumers, it has had the unintended consequence of leading companies to outsource jobs to areas where labor is cheapest. Today, the West's economy is largely service and information-based, with most of the factories closing and relocating to China and India.

European countries have had very good relations with each other since 1980. The European Union has become increasingly powerful, taking on roles traditionally reserved for the nation-state. Although real power still exists in the individual member states, one major achievement of the Union was the introduction of the Euro, a currency adopted by most EU countries.

Australia and New Zealand continued their large multi-ethnic immigration programs and became more integrated in the Asia Pacific region. While remaining constitutional monarchies within the Commonwealth, distance has grown between them and Britain, spurred on by Britain's entry into the European Common Market. Australia and New Zealand have integrated their own economies via a free trade agreement. While political and cultural ties with North America and Europe remain strong, economic reform and commodities trade with the booming economies of Asia have set the South Pacific nations on a new economic trajectory with Australia largely avoiding a downturn in the Great Recession which unleashed severe economic loss through North America and Western Europe.

Today Canada remains part of the Commonwealth, and relations between French and English Canada have continued to present problems. A referendum was held in Quebec, however, in 1980, in which Quebecers voted to remain part of Canada.

In 1990, the white-minority government of the Republic of South Africa, led by F. W. de Klerk, began negotiations to dismantle the system of apartheid. South Africa held its first universal elections in 1994, which the African National Congress (ANC), led by Nelson Mandela, won by an overwhelming majority. The country has since rejoined the Commonwealth of Nations.

Since 1991, the United States has been regarded as the world's only superpower. Politically, the United States is dominated by the Republican and Democratic parties. Presidents of the United States between 1980 and 2006 have been Ronald Reagan, George H. W. Bush, Bill Clinton, and George W. Bush. Since 1980, Americans have become far more optimistic about their country than they were in the 1970s. Since the 1960s, a large number of immigrants have been coming into the U.S., mostly from Asia and Latin America, with the largest single group being Mexicans. Large numbers from those areas have also been coming illegally, and the solution to this problem has produced much debate in the U.S.

On 11 September 2001, the United States suffered the worst terrorist attack in its history. Four planes were hijacked by Islamic extremists and crashed into the World Trade Center, the Pentagon, and a field in Pennsylvania.

The 2008 financial crisis was triggered by a liquidity shortfall in the United States banking system, and resulted in the collapse of large financial institutions, the bailout of banks by national governments, and downturns in stock markets throughout much of the West. The United States and Britain faced serious downturn, while Portugal, Greece, Ireland and Iceland faced major debt crises. Almost uniquely among Western nations, Australia avoided recession off the back of strong Asian trade and 25 years of economic reform and low levels of government debt.

Evidence of the major demographic and social shifts which have taken place within Western society since World War II can be found with the elections of national level leaders: United States (Barack Obama was elected president in 2009, becoming the first African-American to hold that office), France (Nicolas Sarkozy, a president of France of Hungarian descent), Germany (Angela Merkel, the first female leader of that nation), and Australia (Julia Gillard, also the first female leader of that nation).

=== Western nations and the world ===
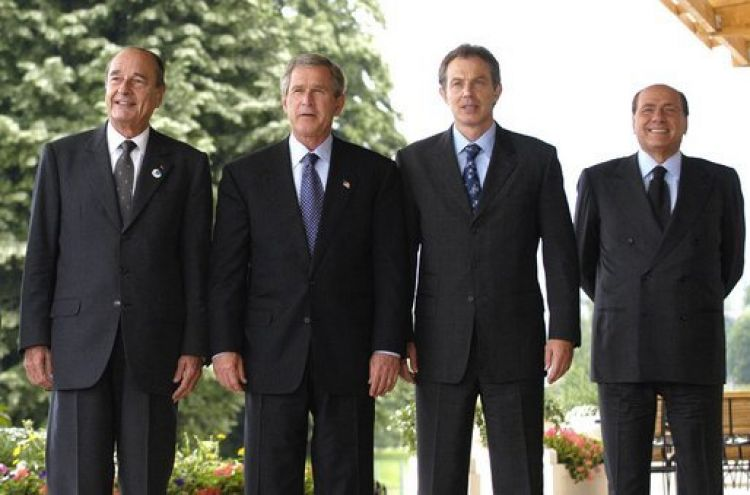
Jacques Chirac, George W. Bush, Tony Blair and Silvio Berlusconi. They are considered the symbolic leaders of 2000s.

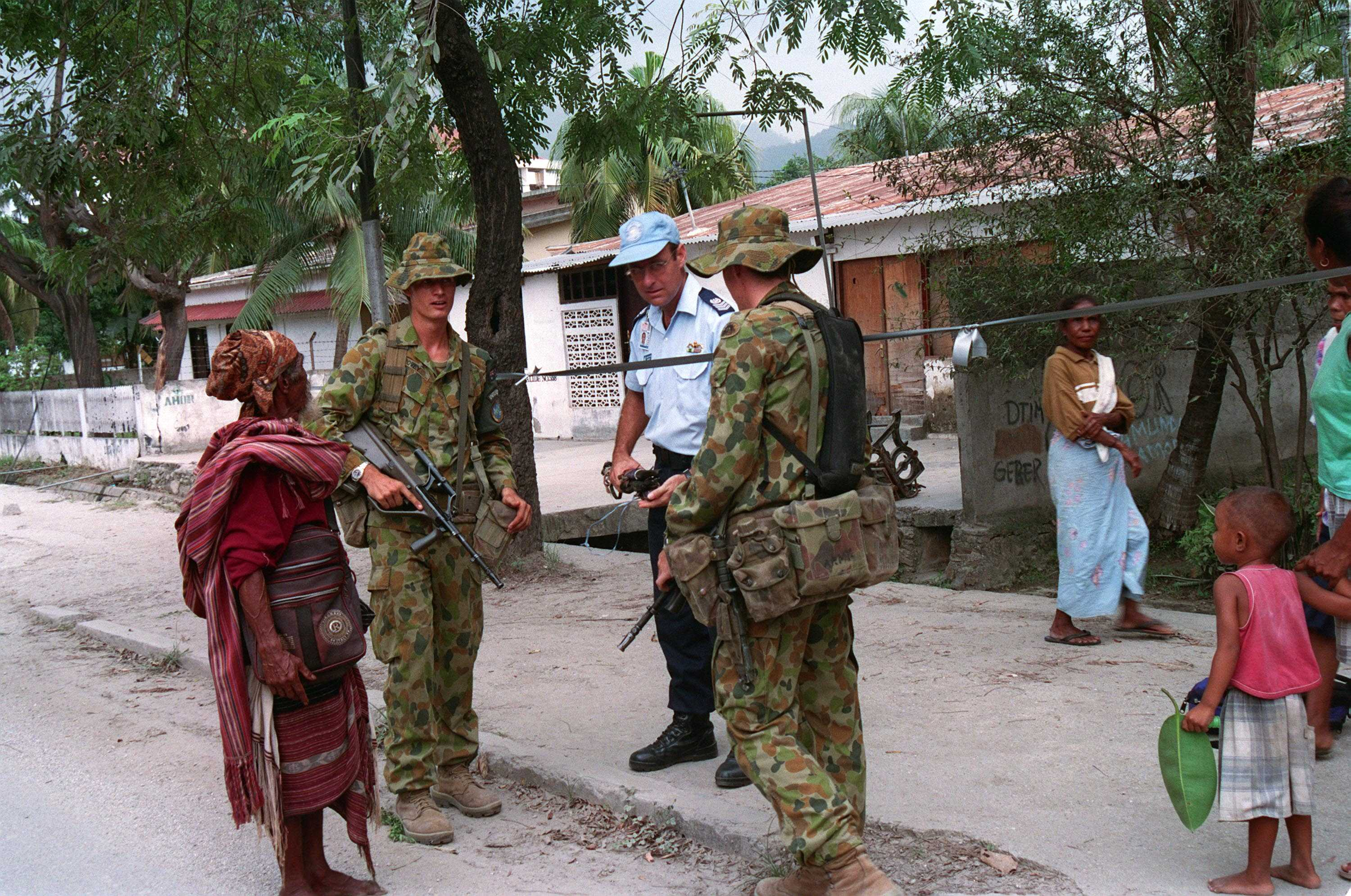
Australian soldiers on patrol as part of the UN's International Force East Timor in 2000.

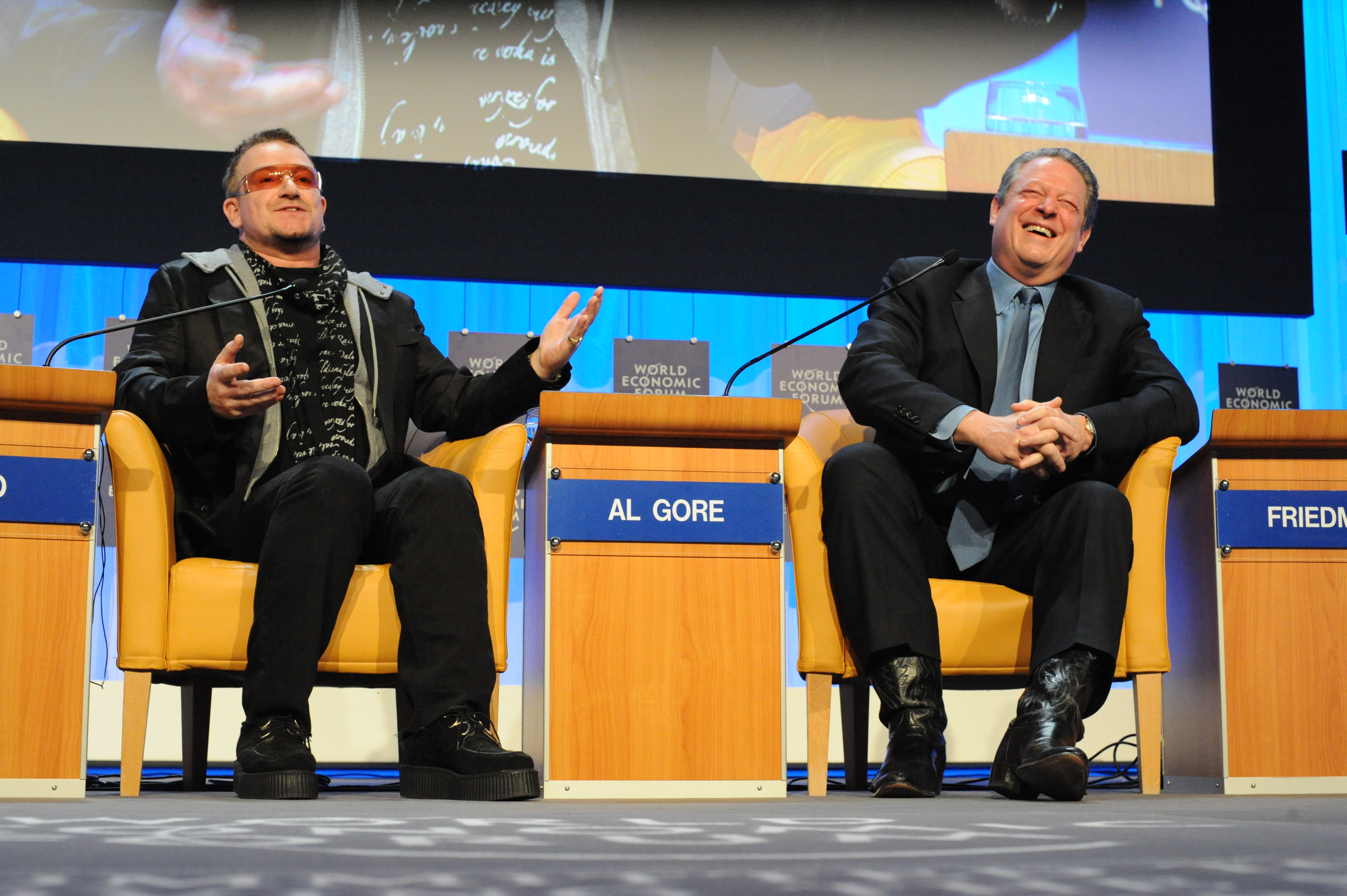
Rock star Bono with former U.S. Vice President Al Gore at the World Economic Forum in 2008.

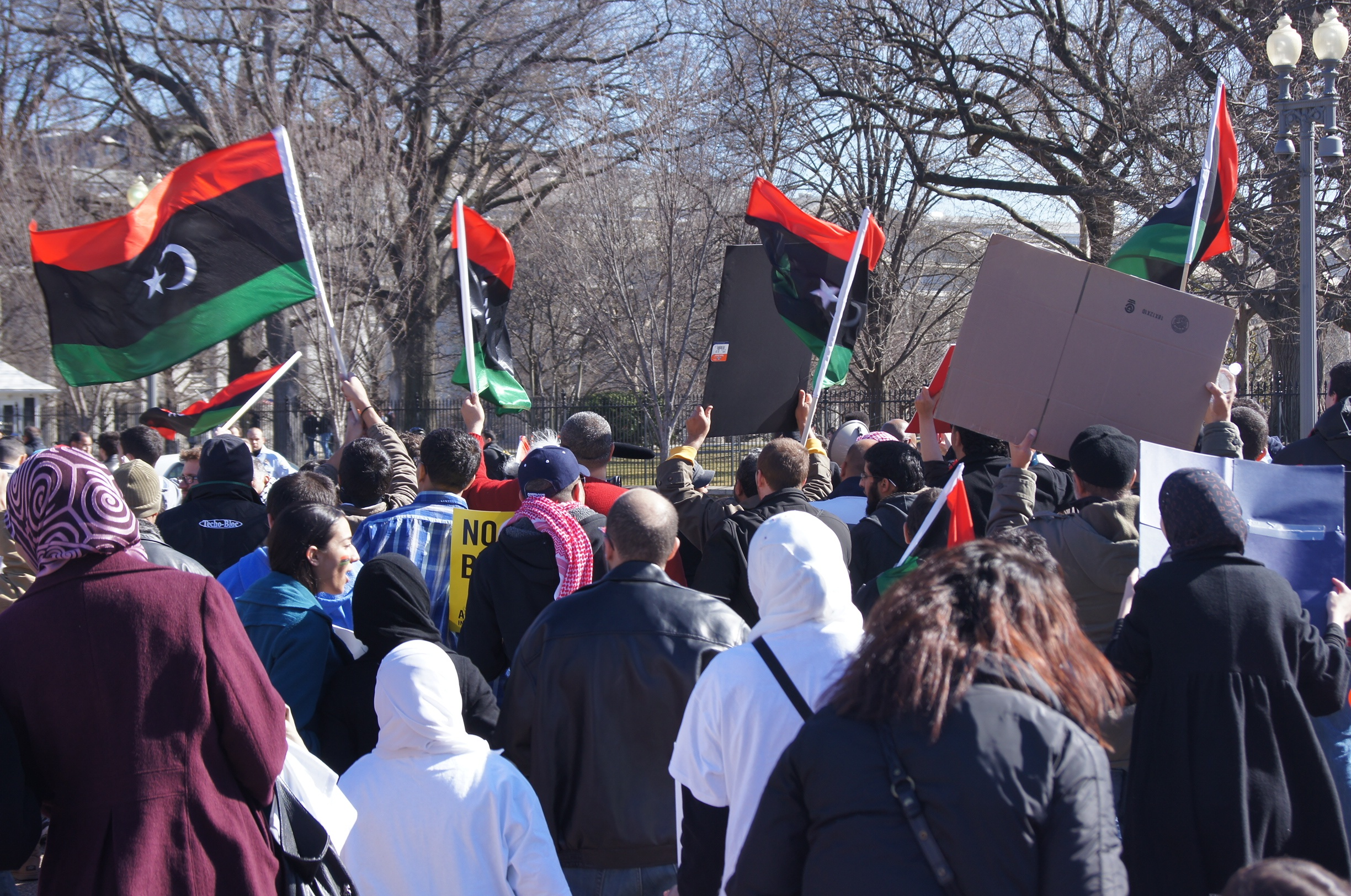
Protesters in Washington calling for a military intervention in Libya in 2011.

Following 1991, Western nations provided troops and aid to many war-torn areas of the world. Some of these missions were unsuccessful, like the attempt by the United States to provide relief in Somalia in the early 1990s. A very successful peace-making operation was conducted in the Balkans in the late 1990s, however. After the Cold War, Yugoslavia broke up into several countries along ethnic lines, and soon countries and ethnic groups within countries of the former Yugoslavia began fighting one another. Eventually, NATO troops arrived in 1999 and ended the conflict. Australian led a United Nations mission into East Timor in 1999 (INTERFET) to restore order during that nation's transition to democracy and independence from Indonesia.

The greatest war fought by the West in the 1990s, however, was the Persian Gulf War. In 1990, the Middle Eastern nation of Iraq, under its brutal dictator Saddam Hussein, invaded the much smaller neighbouring country of Kuwait. After refusing to withdraw troops, the United Nations condemned Iraq and sent troops to liberate Kuwait. American, British, French, Egyptian and Syrian troops all took part in the liberation. The war ended in 1991, with the withdrawal of Iraqi troops from Kuwait and Iraq's agreement to allow United Nations inspectors to search for weapons of mass destruction in Iraq.

The West had become increasingly unpopular in the Middle East following World War II. The Arab states greatly disliked the West's support for Israel. Many soon had a special hatred towards the United States, Israel's greatest ally. Also, partly to ensure stability on the region and a steady supply of the oil the world economy needed, the United States supported many corrupt dictatorships in the Middle East.

In 1979, an Islamic revolution in Iran overthrew the pro-Western Shah and established an anti-Western Shiite Islamic theocracy. Following the withdrawal of Soviet troops from Afghanistan, most of the country came under the rule of a Sunni Islamic theocracy, the Taliban. The Taliban offered shelter to the Islamic terrorist group Al-Qaeda, founded by the extremist Saudi Arabian exile Osama bin Laden. Al-Qaeda launched a series of attacks on United States overseas interests in the 1990s and 2000. Following the September 11 attacks, however, the United States overthrew the Taliban government and captured or killed many Al Qaeda leaders, including Bin Laden.

In 2003, the United States led a controversial war in Iraq, because Saddam had never accounted for all his weapons of mass destruction. By May of that year, American, British, Polish and troops from other countries had defeated and occupied Iraq. Weapons of mass destruction however, were never found afterwards. In both Afghanistan and Iraq, the United States and its allies established democratic governments. Following the Iraq war, however, an insurgency made up of a number of domestic and foreign factions has cost many lives and made establishing a government very hard.

In March 2011, a multi-state coalition led by NATO began a military intervention in Libya to implement United Nations Security Council Resolution 1973, which was taken in response to threat made by the government of Muammar Gaddafi against the civilian population of Libya during the 2011 Libyan civil war.

=== Western society and culture (since 1980) ===
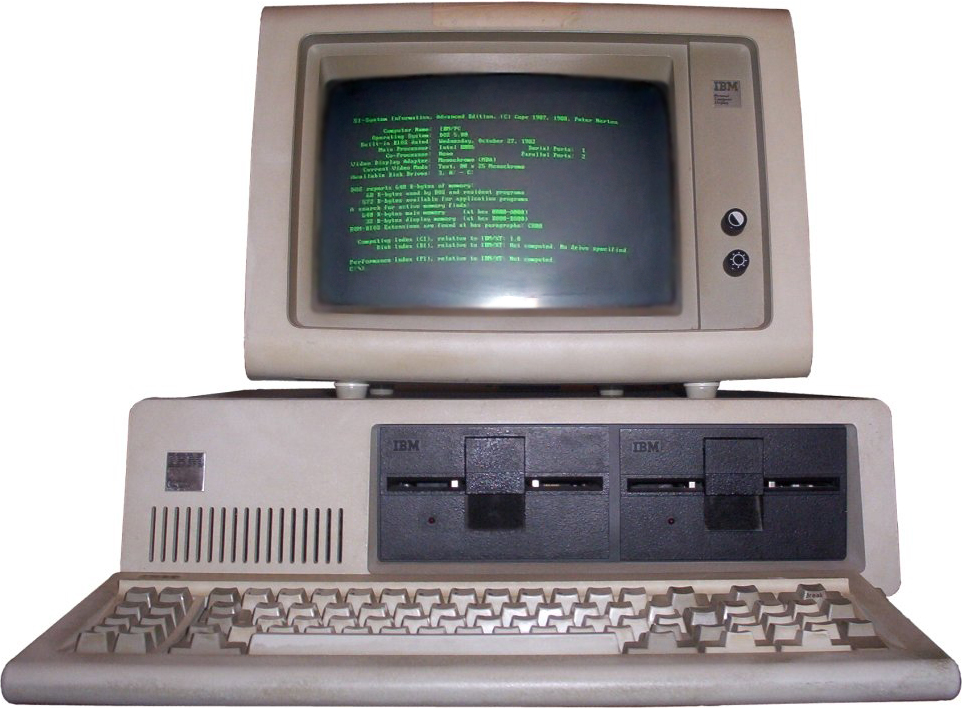
IBM 5150, released in 1981

In general, Western culture has become increasingly secular in Northern Europe, North America, Australia and New Zealand. Nevertheless, in a sign of the continuing status of the ancient Western institution of the Papacy in the early 21st century, the Funeral of Pope John Paul II brought together the single largest gathering in history of heads of state outside the United Nations. It is likely to have been the largest single gathering of Christianity in history, with numbers estimated in excess of four million mourners gathering in Rome. He was followed by another non-Italian Benedict XVI, whose near-unprecedented retirement from the papacy in 2013 ushered in the election of the Argentine Pope Francis – the first pope from the Americas, the new demographic heartland of Catholicism.

Personal computers emerged from the West as a new society changing phenomenon during this period. In the 1960s, experiment began on networks linking computers and from these experiments grew the World Wide Web.

== Historiography ==
Chicago historian William H. McNeill wrote The Rise of the West (1965) to show how the separate civilizations of Eurasia interacted from the very beginning of their history, borrowing critical skills from one another, and thus precipitating still further change as adjustment between traditional old and borrowed new knowledge and practice became necessary. He then discusses the dramatic effect of Western civilization on others in the past 500 years of history. McNeill took a broad approach organized around the interactions of peoples across the globe. Such interactions have become both more numerous and more continual and substantial in recent times. Before about 1500, the network of communication between cultures was that of Eurasia. The term for these areas of interaction differ from one world historian to another and include world-system and ecumene. His emphasis on cultural fusions influenced historical theory significantly.

== See also ==
- Outline of the history of Western civilization
- Role of Christianity in civilization
- History of Europe
- Eurocentrism

Media

- Civilisation: A Personal View by Kenneth Clark (TV series), BBC TV, 1969
- The Ascent of Man (TV series), BBC TV, 1973
