= Cova da Iria =

Quarter in Fátima, Santarém District, Portugal

Coordinates: 39°37′54″N 08°40′24″W

The Sanctuary of Our Lady of Fátima in Cova da Iria, Fátima, Portugal

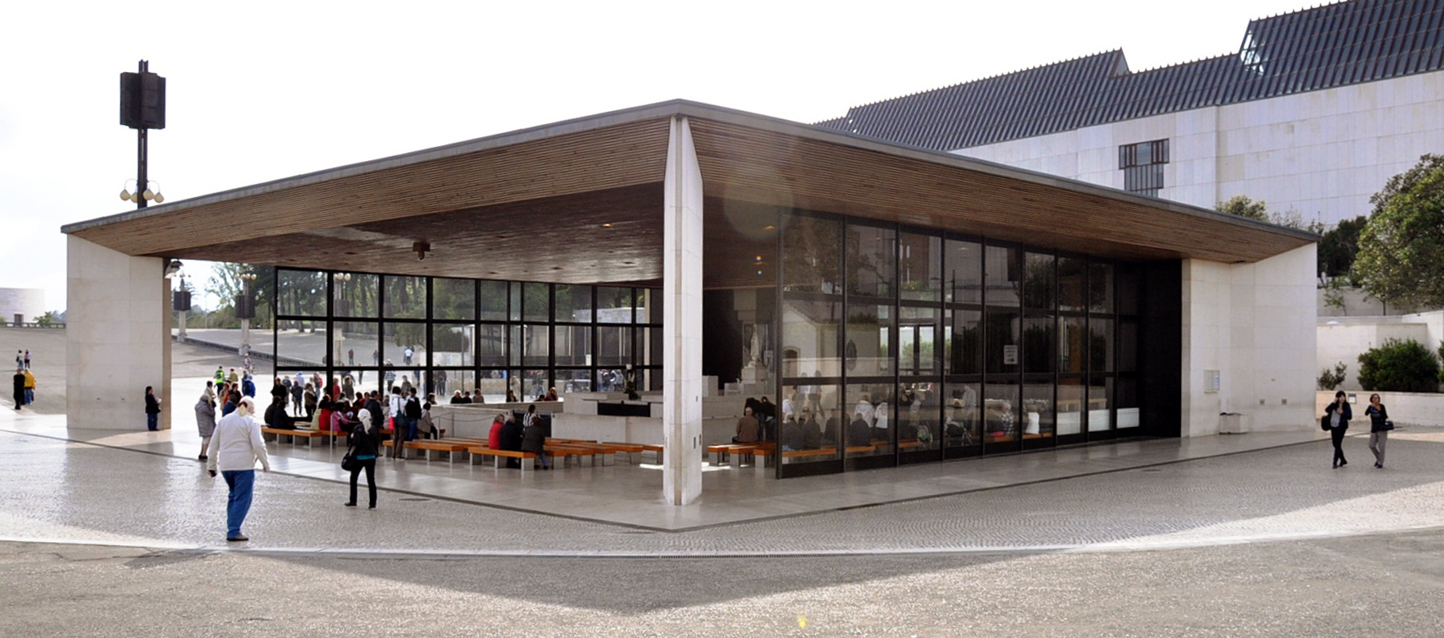
A panoramic view of the Chapel of the Apparitions in Cova da Iria

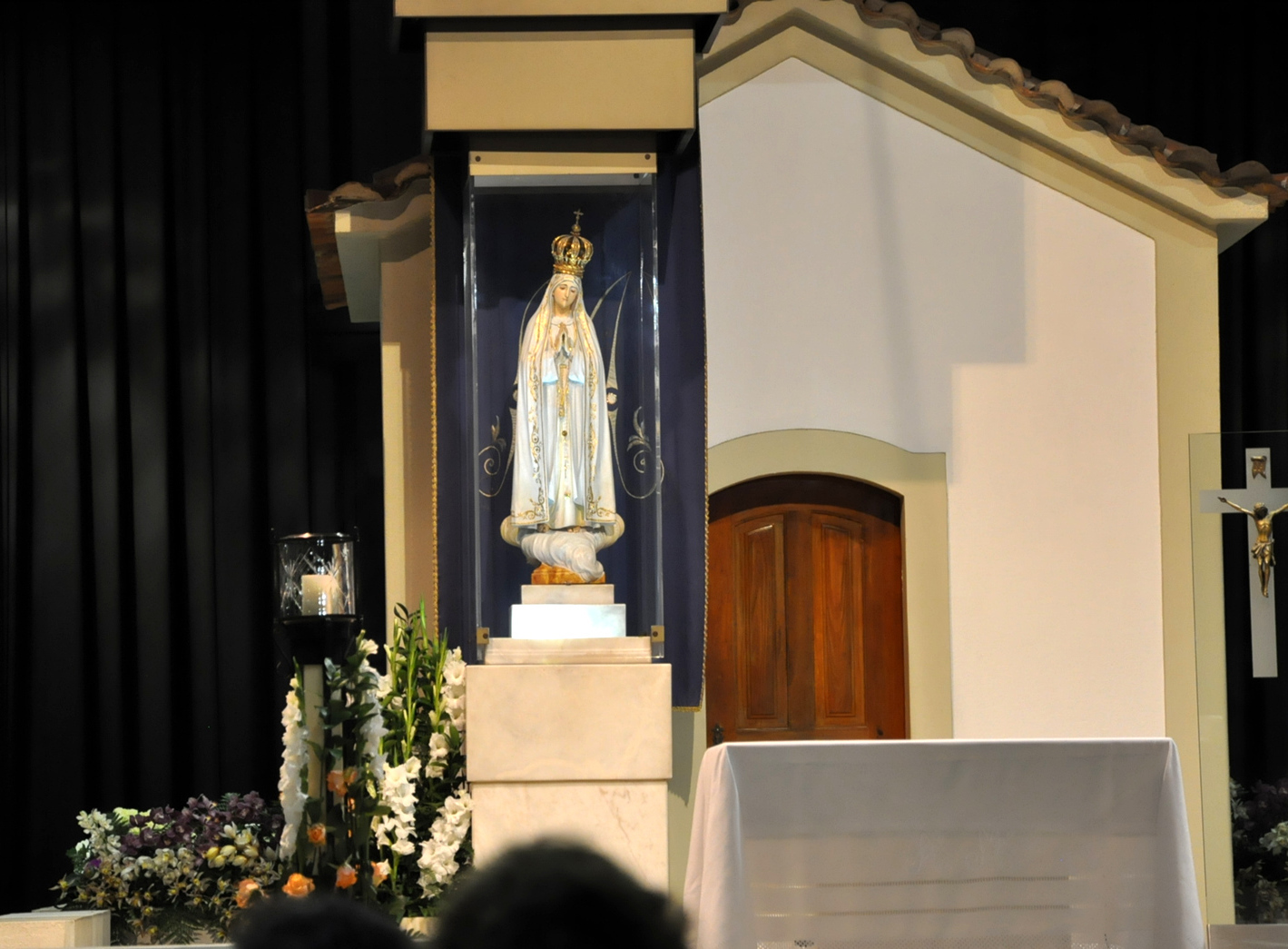
The original Capelinha (“Little Chapel”) in the Chapel of the Apparitions. This is the spot of most of the reported visions.

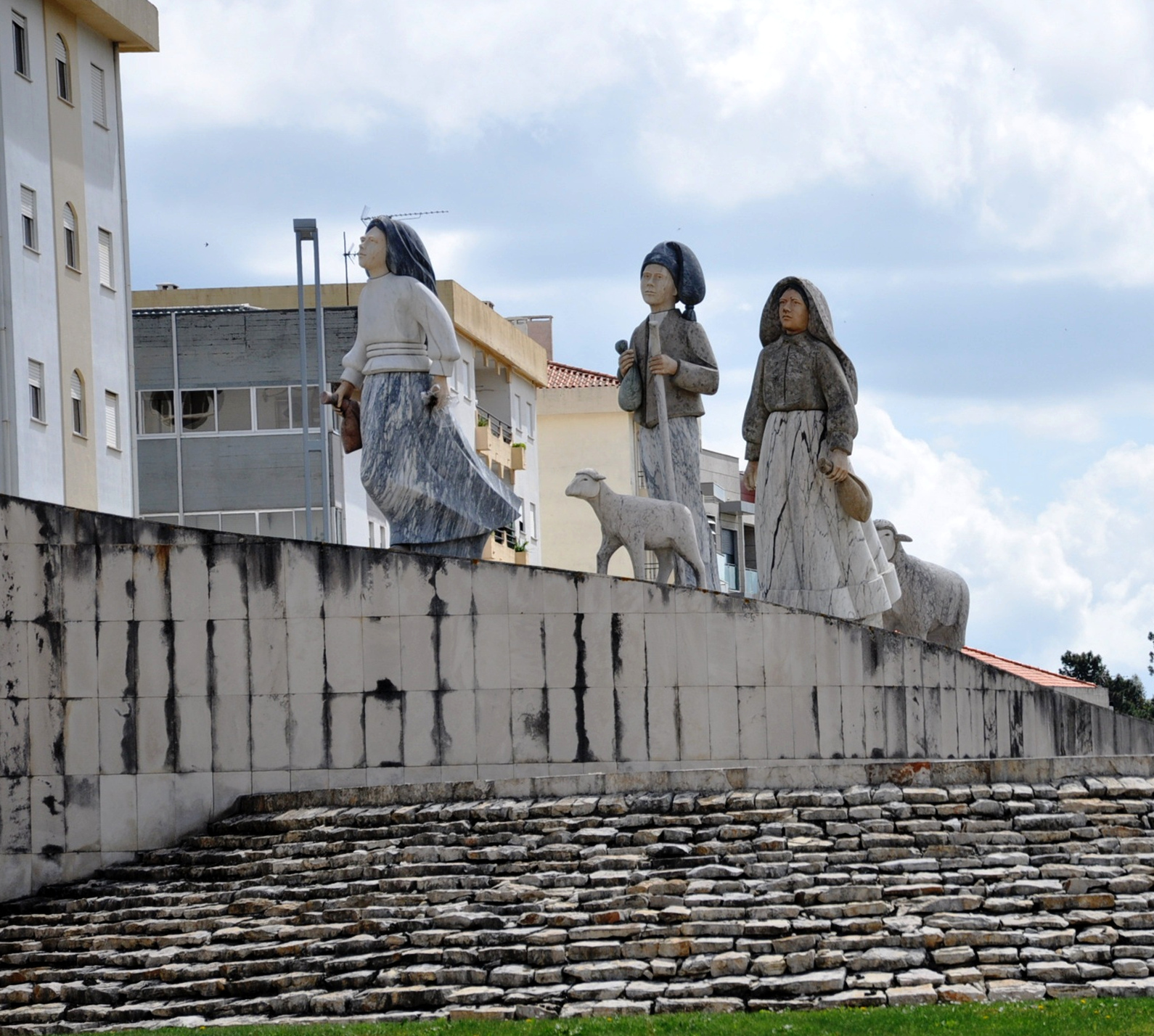
Monument dedicated to the seers, Venerable Lúcia dos Santos and Saints Jacinta and Francisco Marto.

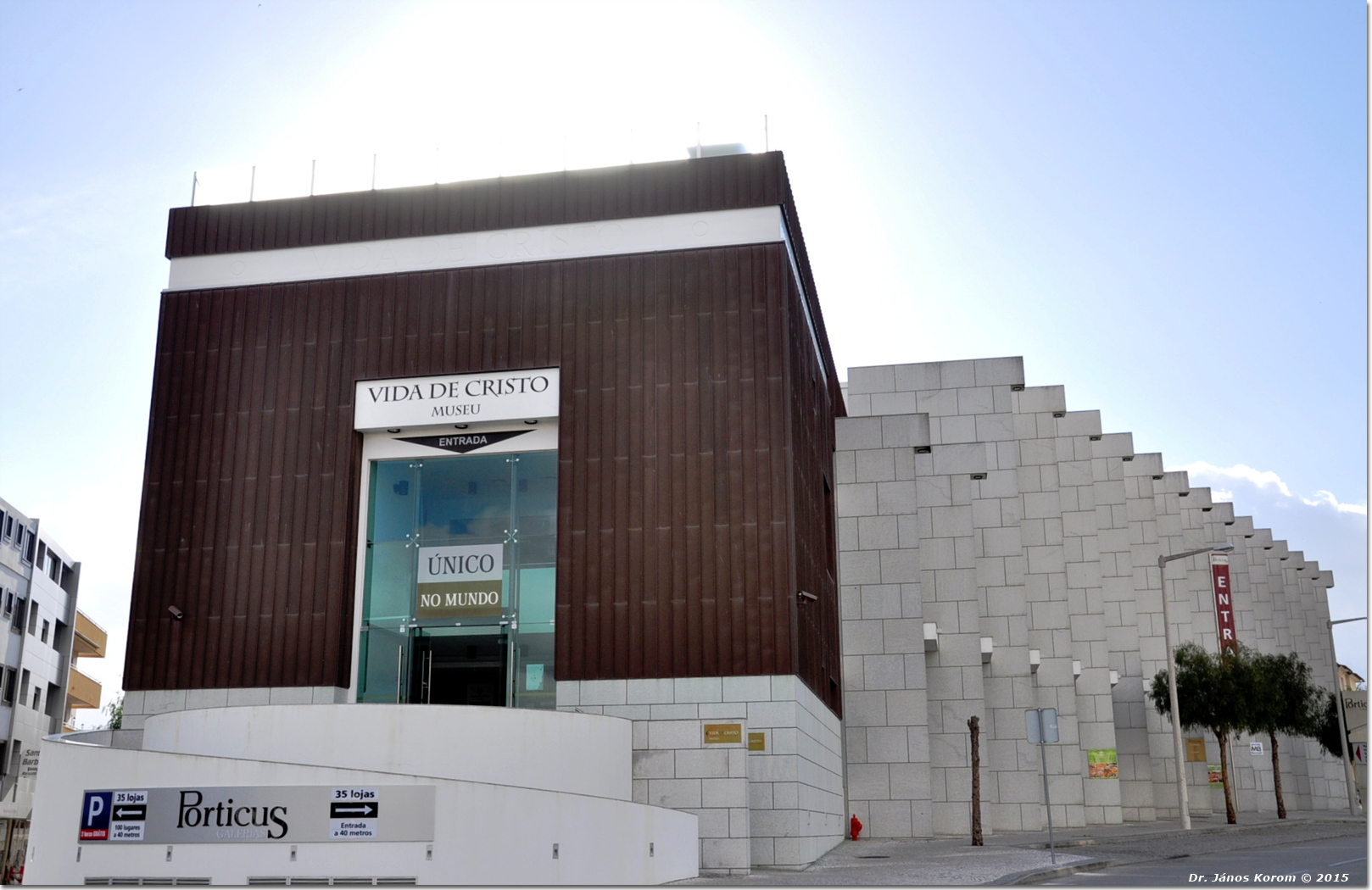
The Life of Christ Museum in Fátima.

Cova da Iria is a quarter in the city and civil parish of Fátima, in Portugal. Most of the reported apparitions of the Blessed Virgin Mary to three shepherd children from the town took place here in 1917.

This neighborhood is considered a high income area of the city as it hosts numerous attractions, convents, hotels, and pilgrims’ hostels, and other tourist facilities. It is near the Aljustrel and Valinhos, two sites also associated with the visions.

== History ==
Cova da Iria was originally a field belonging to the family of Lúcia dos Santos in Fátima, Portugal. Lúcia and Francisco and Jacinta Marto were the three children who, according to the Catholic Church, received several apparitions and heavenly messages from the Blessed Virgin Mary, Mother of God.

The children frequently pastured their families' sheep on this land, and were responsible for their care. According to Sister Lúcia's memoirs written between 1935 and 1941, she and her cousins were at the Cova da Iria when they saw an apparition of a beautiful lady “made of light, holding a rosary in her hand”. She seemed to stand just above a small holm oak tree, and heard her tell them not to be afraid, adding “I come from Heaven”. Sister Lúcia wrote they saw her a total of six times, the last on October 13, 1917, when the Miracle of the Sun occurred. It was witnessed by over 70,000 people and reported in the secular newspaper, O Seculo. The children heard her call herself “Our Lady of the Rosary” telling them to pray the Rosary for the end of the Great War.

A small chapel or Capelinha (later popularly called Chapel of the Apparitions) was built at the spot in the 1920s, as people were already making pilgrimages there. In October 1930, the Bishop of Leiria, Dom José Alves Correia da Silva approved the reported phenomena of Our Lady of Fátima, writing in a pastoral letter “The visions of the children in the Cova da Iria are worthy of belief.”

Since the Holy See officially approved of the Fátima events and the messages given to the three shepherd children, the place has become a popular pilgrimage site. The chapel has been expanded, and nearby are two minor basilicas in the Sanctuary of Fátima complex that covers the Cova da Iria. Also on the grounds are luxurious hotels, convents, and some medical facilities. The Cova da Iria has thus become a key international hub for religious tourism, receiving six to eight million pilgrims by year.

== See also ==
- Sanctuary of Fátima
- Parish Church of Fátima
- The Miracle of Our Lady of Fatima, 1952 film
- Fatima, 2020 film
- Life of Christ Museum
- Wax Museum of Fátima
