= The Miracle of Our Lady of Fatima =

1952 American film by John Brahm

- Theatrical release poster
- Directed by: John Brahm
- Written by: James O'Hanlon; Crane Wilbur
- Produced by: Bryan Foy
- Starring: Susan Whitney; Sherry Jackson; Sammy Ogg; Gilbert Roland
- Narrated by: Walter Hampden
- Cinematography: Edwin B. DuPar
- Edited by: Thomas Reilly
- Music by: Max Steiner
- Distributed by: Warner Bros. Pictures
- Release date: August 20, 1952 (New York)
- Running time: 102 minutes
- Language: English

The Miracle of Our Lady of Fatima is a 1952 American WarnerColor feature film about the visions of Our Lady of Fátima that occurred in Portugal in 1917. Directed by John Brahm, the film starring Susan Whitney as Lúcia dos Santos, Sherry Jackson as Jacinta Marto, Sammy Ogg as Francisco Marto, and Gilbert Roland as a fictional character named Hugo, a kindly but agnostic friend of the three children who rediscovered his faith in God through the Miracle of the Sun. The musical score by Max Steiner received an Academy Award nomination..

== Plot ==
In 1917, Portugal is experiencing a storm of antireligious sentiment that accompanied the 5 October 1910 revolution. Churches in Lisbon and the rest of Portugal are shuttered. Many priests, nuns, monks and friars are jailed. The rural town of Fátima is small enough to have escaped much of this persecution, and their church remains open, with most of the townspeople still devout.

In a field outside town on May 13, Lúcia Santos and her cousins Jacinta Marto and Francisco Marto pray their version of the Rosary by yelling "Hail Mary!" but not finishing the prayer. When they hear thunder and see lightning, the children gather their sheep and head home. Another flash of lightning causes them to run straight into an unusual cloud of light surrounding a little tree on which a mysterious Lady stands. Speaking slowly and gently, the Lady asks them to return on the 13th of each month and to offer their sufferings to God for the salvation of sinners. She entreats them to recite the Rosary for world peace. Later, they encounter their agnostic friend Hugo da Silva, who advises them to not reveal the vision to anyone else, but on returning home, Jacinta tells her parents.

Jacinta and Francisco's parents believe the story, but Lúcia's mother reacts with disgust and subjects her daughter to emotional and physical pressure to abandon what she considers to be a dangerous lie. She forbids Lúcia to return to the Cova da Iria, but Lúcia returns anyway for the June 13 appearance, when she is told by the Lady that her cousins will die and go to heaven soon, while she will live a long life in holy service. The parish priest Father Ferreira suggests that the visions might be coming from Satan. The local authorities close the Fátima church until the priest can convince the parishioners that no visions have occurred. The next month, on July 13, the Lady appears again, predicting that another war will occur if the world does not stop sinning. She also predicts that evil will emanate from Russia if the Russians lose their faith. Kidnapped by provincial administrator Artur Santos, the children are first offered bribes, then threatened with death, if they refuse to change their story. Santos tries to frighten them into compliance, but they continue to refuse, so Santos jails them. There they find Hugo, who supports them as they convince all of the prisoners to join in praying the Rosary.

Unable to find any prosecutable evidence, Santos frees the children, who find that the entire population of Fátima has been standing outside, praying and waiting for them.

On October 13, when the Lady promised "a sign that will make them believe", about 40,000 people arrive, waiting through a torrential downpour. The Lady appears and says that World War I will soon end and that the soldiers will return home. At precisely noon, as the Lady raises her hand, the clouds part and sunlight shines brightly upon all the people. The sun shifts through a rainbow of colors and appears to move closer, an event called the Miracle of the Sun. Many people panic, some pray or watch calmly and a few sick and disabled people are healed. As the sun returns to normal, Hugo stands in the midst of the kneeling crowd and says, "Only the fool sayeth there is no God."

A short epilogue, shows the present-day huge basilica where the tree once stood and one million people outside paying homage to Our Lady of Fátima. Inside the new basilica, Lúcia is now a nun praying before the tomb of her cousins, with Hugo at her side.

== Cast ==
- Susan Whitney as Lúcia dos Santos
- Sherry Jackson as Jacinta Marto
- Sammy Ogg as Francisco Marto
- Gilbert Roland as Hugo da Silva
- Angela Clarke as Maria Rosa dos Santos
- Jay Novello as António dos Santos
- Frank Silvera as Artur dos Santos
- Richard Hale as Father Ferreira
- Norman Rice as Manuel Marto
- Frances Morris as Olímpia Marto
- Carl Milletaire as District Magistrate
- J. Carroll Naish as Narrator
- Ethan Laidlaw as Villager (uncredited)
- Jack Mower as Villager (uncredited)
- Virginia Gibson as Virgin Mary (uncredited)

== Reception ==
In a contemporary review for The New York Times, critic A. H. Weiler called the film "spiritual document for the faithful and a serious but unspectacular drama for others" and wrote: "Since the producers are not setting any precedent in essaying a subject of this nature, they cannot be credited with a crusading spirit. However, they have treated a sectarian theme respectfully, and, technically, the production is well-turned and enhanced by the hues of WarnerColor. It is essentially a shining tribute to the strong faith of three youngsters whose unswerving belief moved men. But in dramatizing this religious case history, Crane Wilbur and James O'Hanlon, the scenarists, were faced by what appears to this observer to be an insurmountable hurdle. Once the three children have witnessed their visions it is difficult to prolong visual and story suspense. It then becomes fairly obvious what the train of events will be and the lessening of dramatic impact is felt throughout the middle portions of the film."

== Awards ==
The musical score by Max Steiner was nominated for Best Music Score of a Dramatic or Comedy Picture at the 25th Academy Awards.

== See also ==
- Our Lady of Fátima
- Cova da Iria in Fátima
- Sanctuary of Fátima
- Parish Church of Fátima
- Fatima, 2020 film
- The Song of Bernadette, 1943 film
