= Parish Church of Fátima =

Church in Fátima, Santarém, Portugal

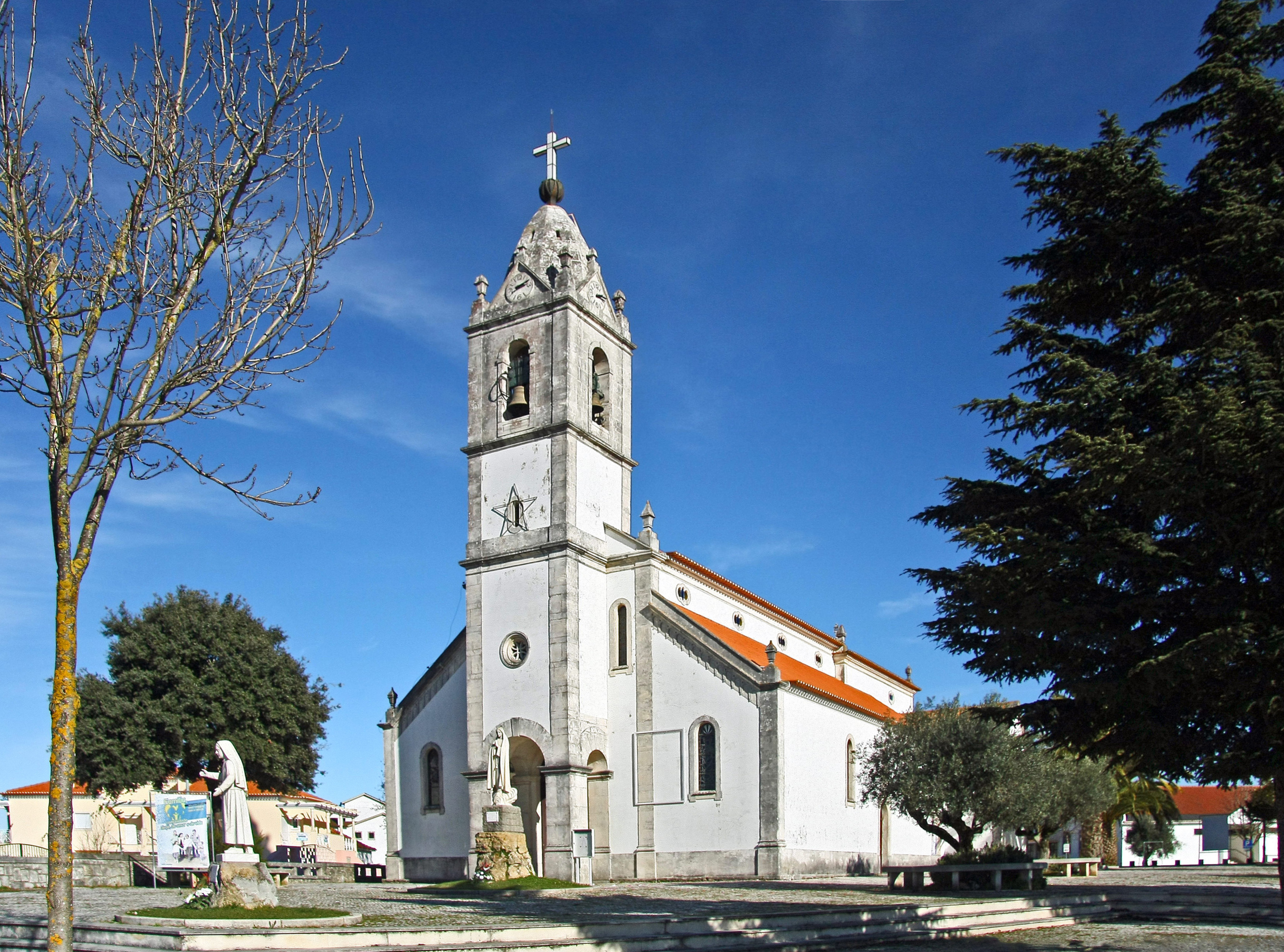
The Mother / Parish Church of Fátima

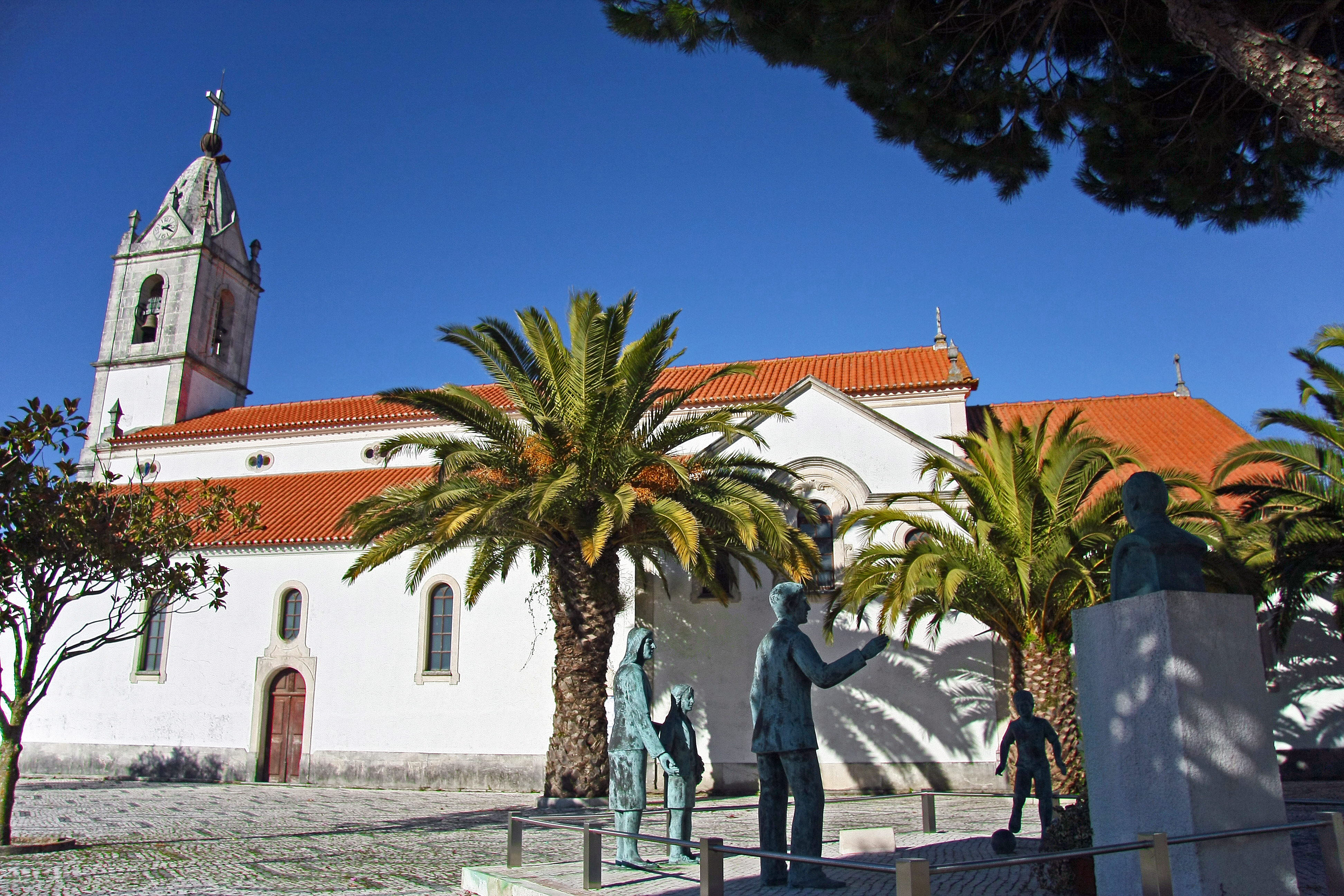
Side view of the Parish Church of Fátima and of the Little Shepherds

The Parish Church of Fátima, also known as Parish Church of Fátima and of the Little Shepherds or Mother Church of Fátima, is located in the civil parish of Fátima, municipality of Ourém, in the district of Santarém, province of Beira Litoral, Central region and Middle Tagus sub-region, in Portugal.

== History ==
This Catholic parish church of the Serra de Aire region, currently integrated in the civil parish and city of Fátima, has as its patron saint Our Lady of the Pleasures and was spun off from the Collegiate of Ourém in the year 1568. In its vicinity there are the places of Aljustrel, Cova da Iria and Valinhos.

As a parish jurisdiction it has, in the village of Moita Redonda, a chapel in honor of Saint Lucy, built in 1604; in Boleiros village, a chapel in honor of Saint Barbara, built in 1607; another chapel in Montelo village, in honor of Our Lady of Life, built in 1604; in Poço do Soudo, a chapel in honor of Saint Anthony; an old and very devoted Marian shrine in Ortiga, in honor of Our Lady of Ortiga, and in the village of Maxieira a chapel in honor of Saint Peter and Our Lady of the Rosary.

It was the place of baptism of the three little shepherds of Fátima, who became world known due to the apparitions of the Virgin Mary.

== Architecture ==
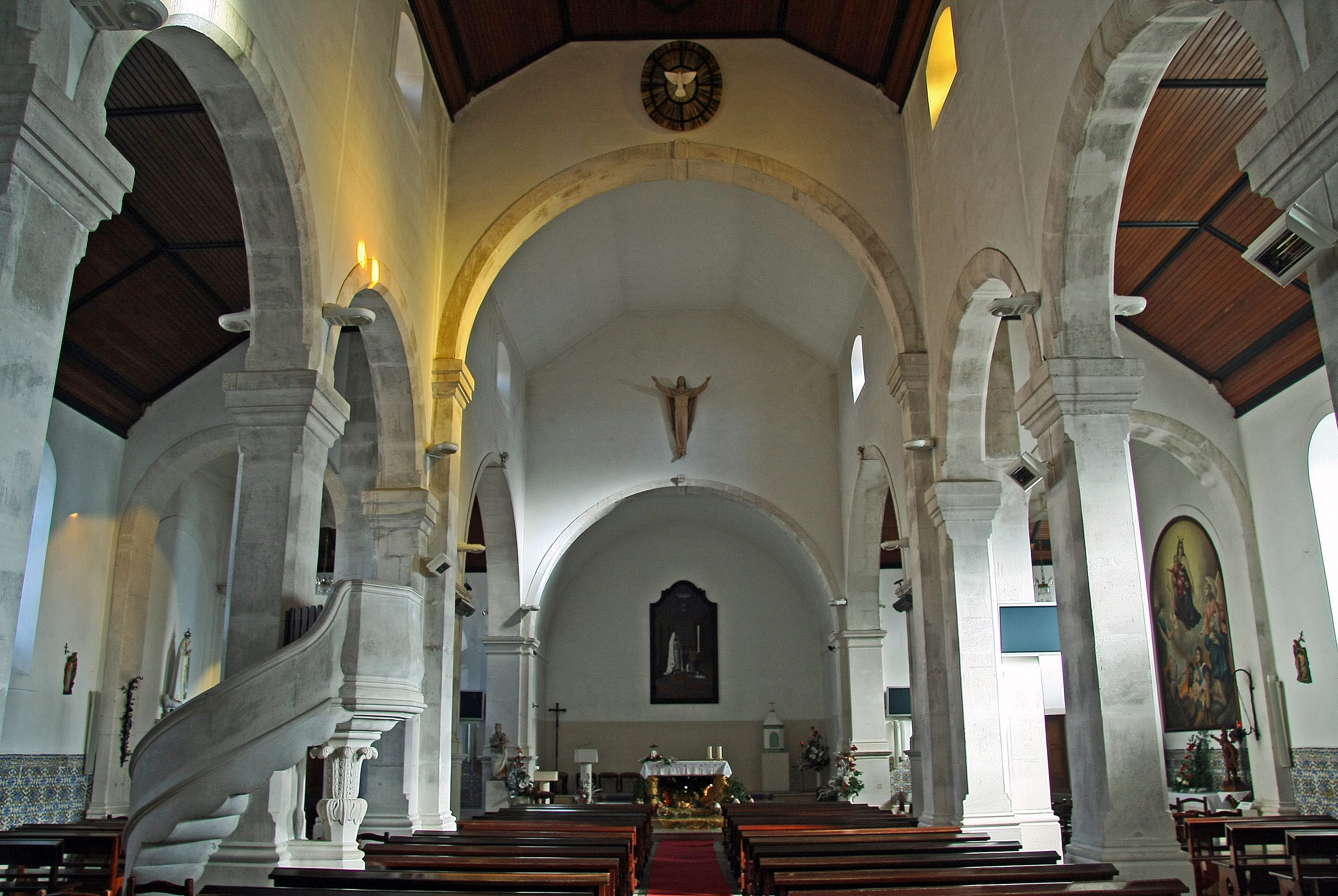
Interior of the Parish Church of Fátima.

The Parish Church of Fátima was almost always under construction: it went from a single nave to three, in 1915, a work completed by Father Agostinho in 1925. In 1956, some more modifications were made to the building, as some columns were removed. Finally, in the year 2000, in the year of the beatification of the little shepherds Francisco and Jacinta Marto, the church saw its most recent renovation and which is preserved into the present.

== See also ==
- Fátima, Portugal
- Our Lady of Fátima
- Chapel of the Apparitions
- Sanctuary of Fátima
