= Aljustrel (Fátima) =

Coordinates: 39°36′57″N 8°39′54″W

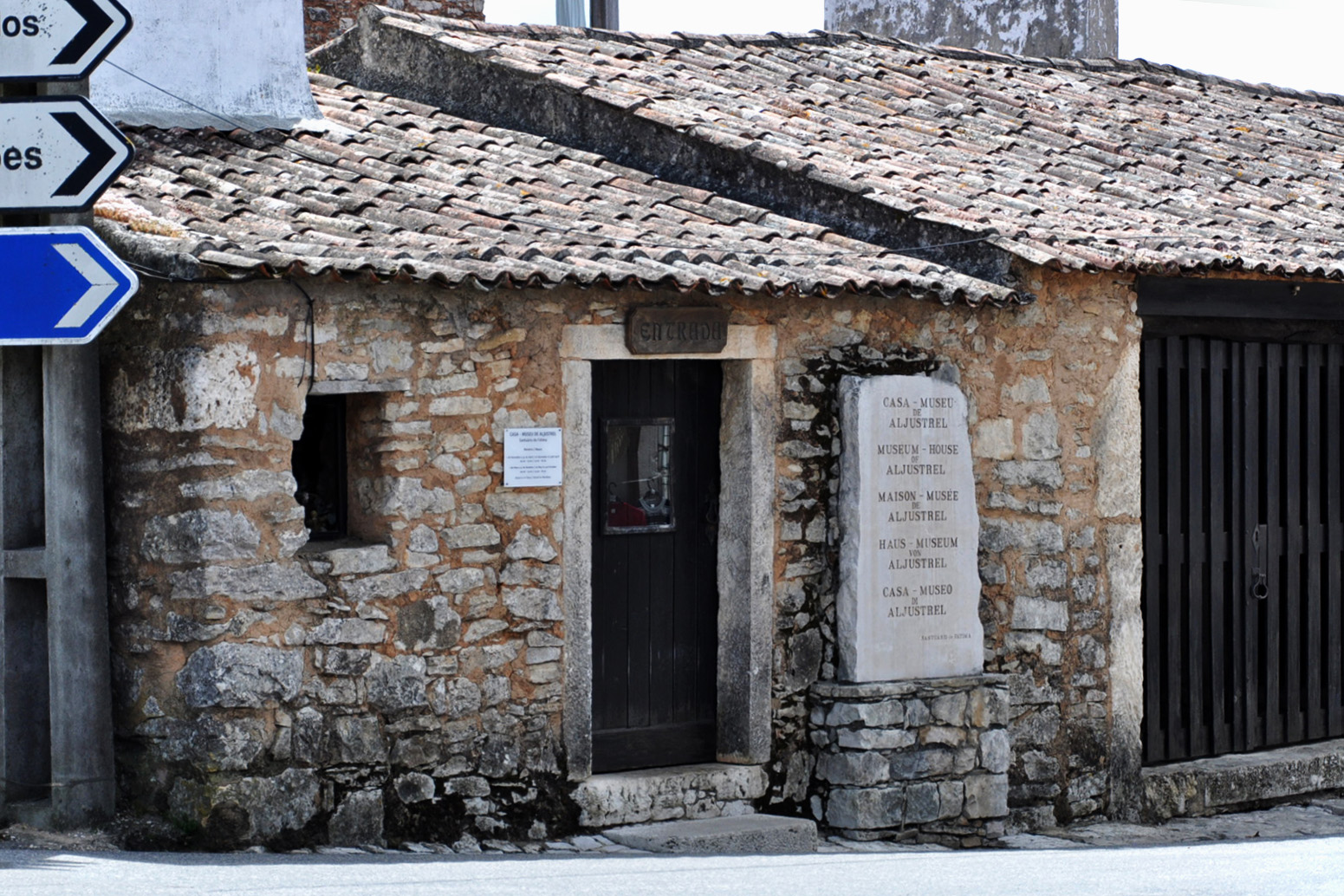
House-museum of Aljustrel

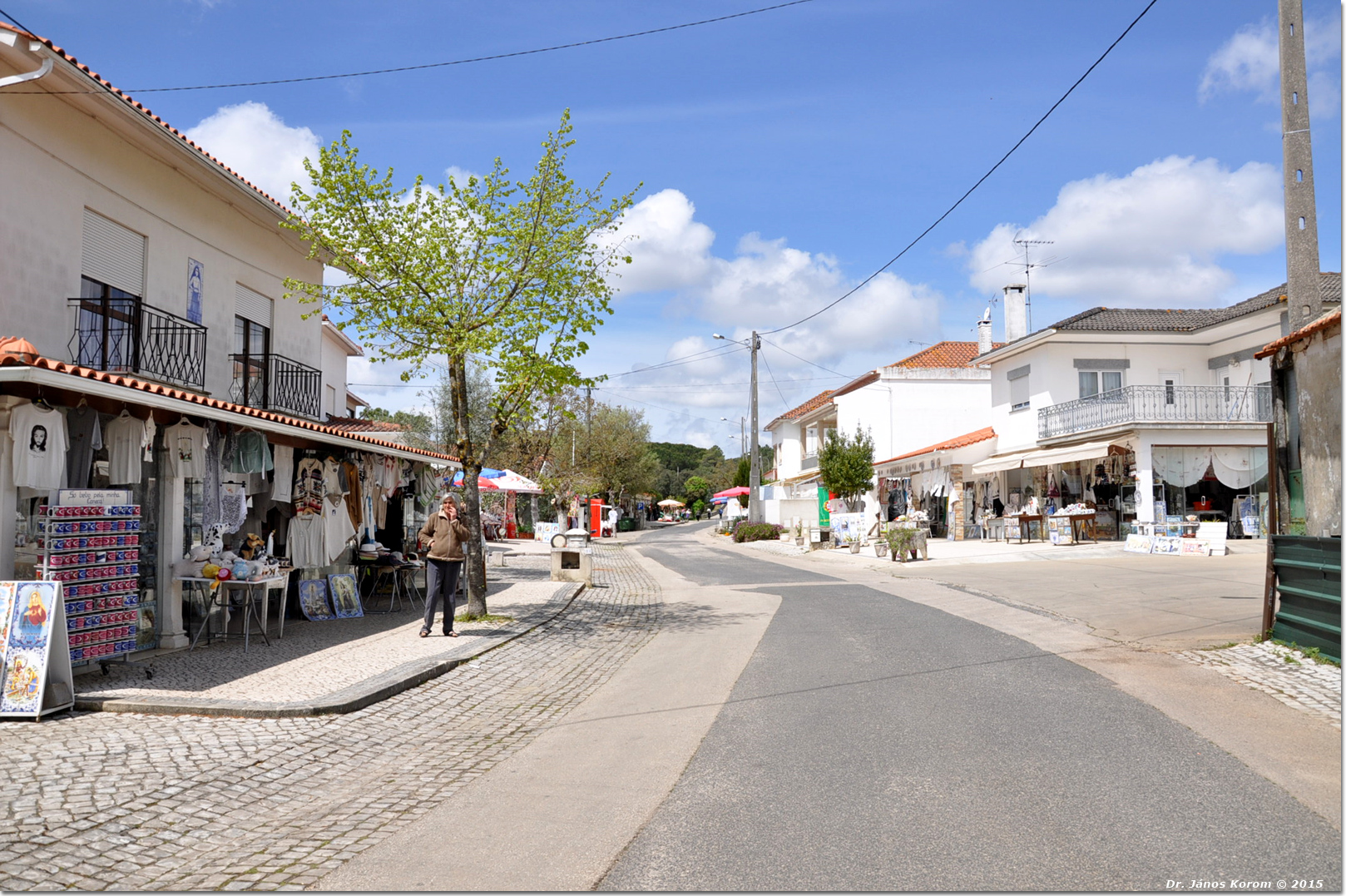
A street of Aljustrel

Aljustrel is a hamlet on the outskirts of Fátima, Portugal, in the municipality of Ourém. It was the birthplace of Lúcia dos Santos, and Francisco and Jacinta Marto, known worldwide as the "three little shepherds of Fátima" or the "three child seers", and the setting for some of the events during the apparitions of Our Lady of Fátima. There is now a small house-museum there.

== See also ==
- Chapel of the Apparitions
- Parish Church of Fátima
- Sanctuary of Fátima
- Wax Museum of Fátima
