= Sister Lúcia =

Portuguese Catholic nun (1907–2005)

Venerable Sister Lúcia de Jesus Rosa dos Santos OCD
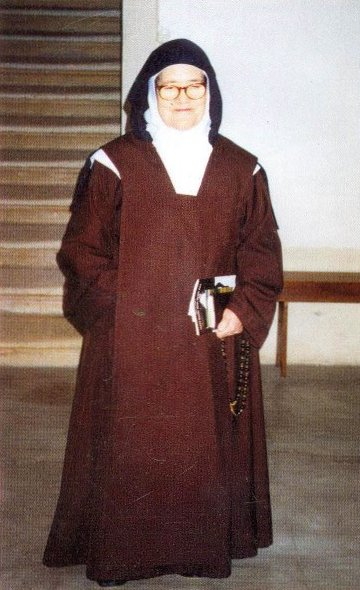
- Sister Lúcia at the Discalced Carmelite convent of Coimbra, c. 1998
- Born: 22 March 1907; Aljustrel, Fátima; Kingdom of Portugal
- Died: 13 February 2005 (aged 97); Coimbra, Portugal
- Major works: Fatima in Lucia's Own Words; Fatima in Lucia's Own Words II; Calls from the Message of Fatima

Lúcia de Jesus Rosa dos Santos, OCD, (22 March 1907 – 13 February 2005) also known as Lúcia of Fátima and by her religious name Maria Lúcia of Jesus and of the Immaculate Heart, was a Discalced Carmelite from Portugal. Sister Lúcia and her cousins Francisco and Jacinta Marto claimed to have witnessed the apparitions of Our Lady of Fátima in 1917. Her beatification process was opened in 2017. In 2023, she was declared venerable.

Born in 1907 to landowning peasants on the outskirts of Fátima, Portugal, Lúcia came to prominence in 1917 as the oldest of the three child seers of the apparitions of Our Lady of Fátima. This involved her and her two cousins, Francisco and Jacinta Marto, claiming to see the Virgin Mary in six apparitions. These apparitions sparked major interest, concluding with what is called the Miracle of the Sun being witnessed by tens of thousands in October of that year.

After Francisco and Jacinta both died during the Spanish Flu, Lúcia remained the only living seer for the rest of her life. In 1921, Lúcia became a religious sister in Spain and eventually a Discalced Carmelite nun in 1948. She wrote numerous memoirs about her experiences at Fátima and numerous letters concerning the events. She also transcribed the Three Secrets of Fátima, the last of which was only published by the Vatican in 2000. Sister Lúcia died on 13 February 2005 at the Carmelite convent of Santa Teresa in Coimbra.

== Early life ==
Lúcia was the youngest child of António dos Santos and Maria Rosa Ferreira (1869–1942), both from Aljustrel, who married on 19 November 1890. Although peasants, the Santos family was not poor, owning land "in the direction of Montelo, Ortiga, Fátima, Valinhos, Cabeço, Charneca, and Cova da Iria."

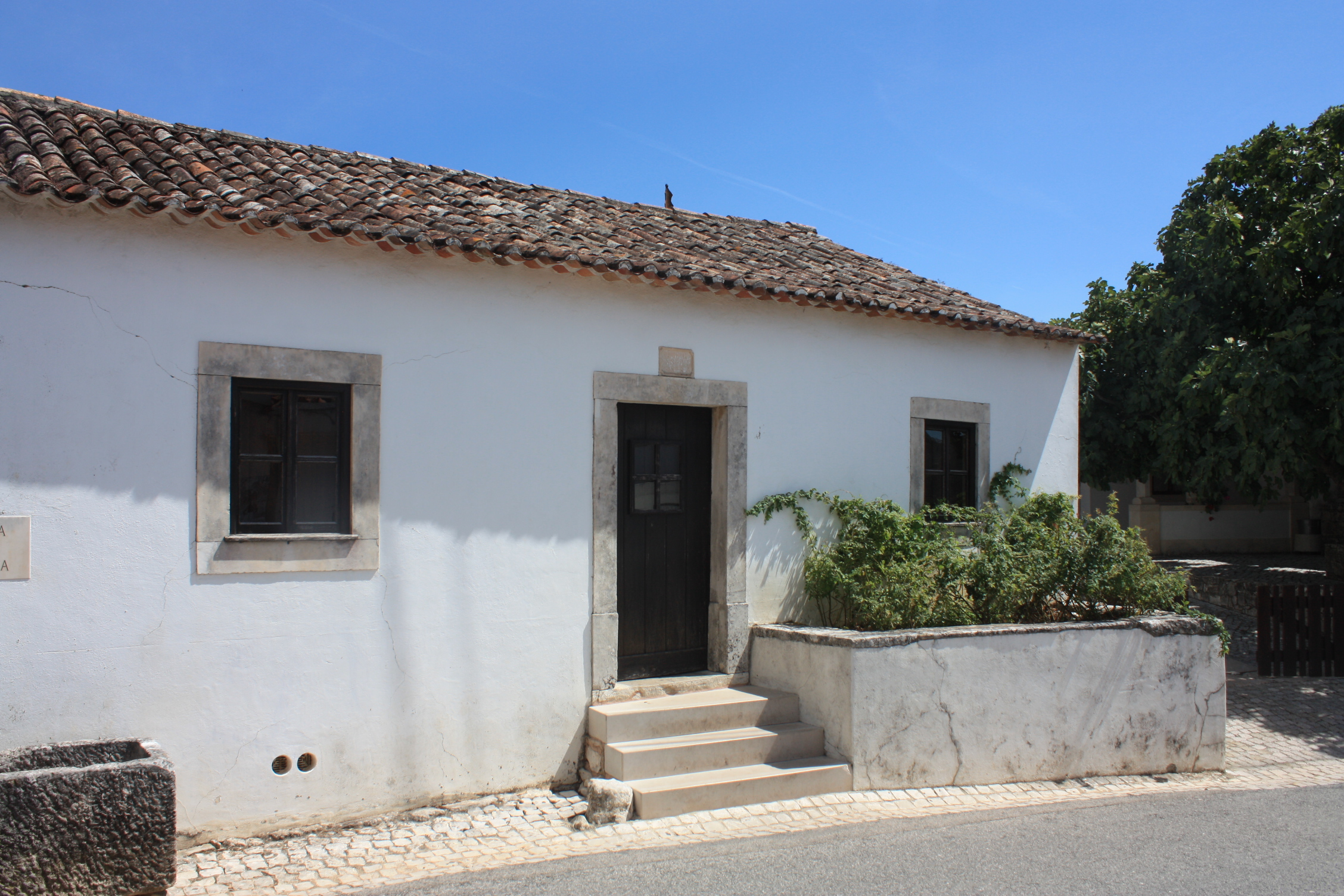
The birthplace of Lúcia in Aljustrel, Fátima

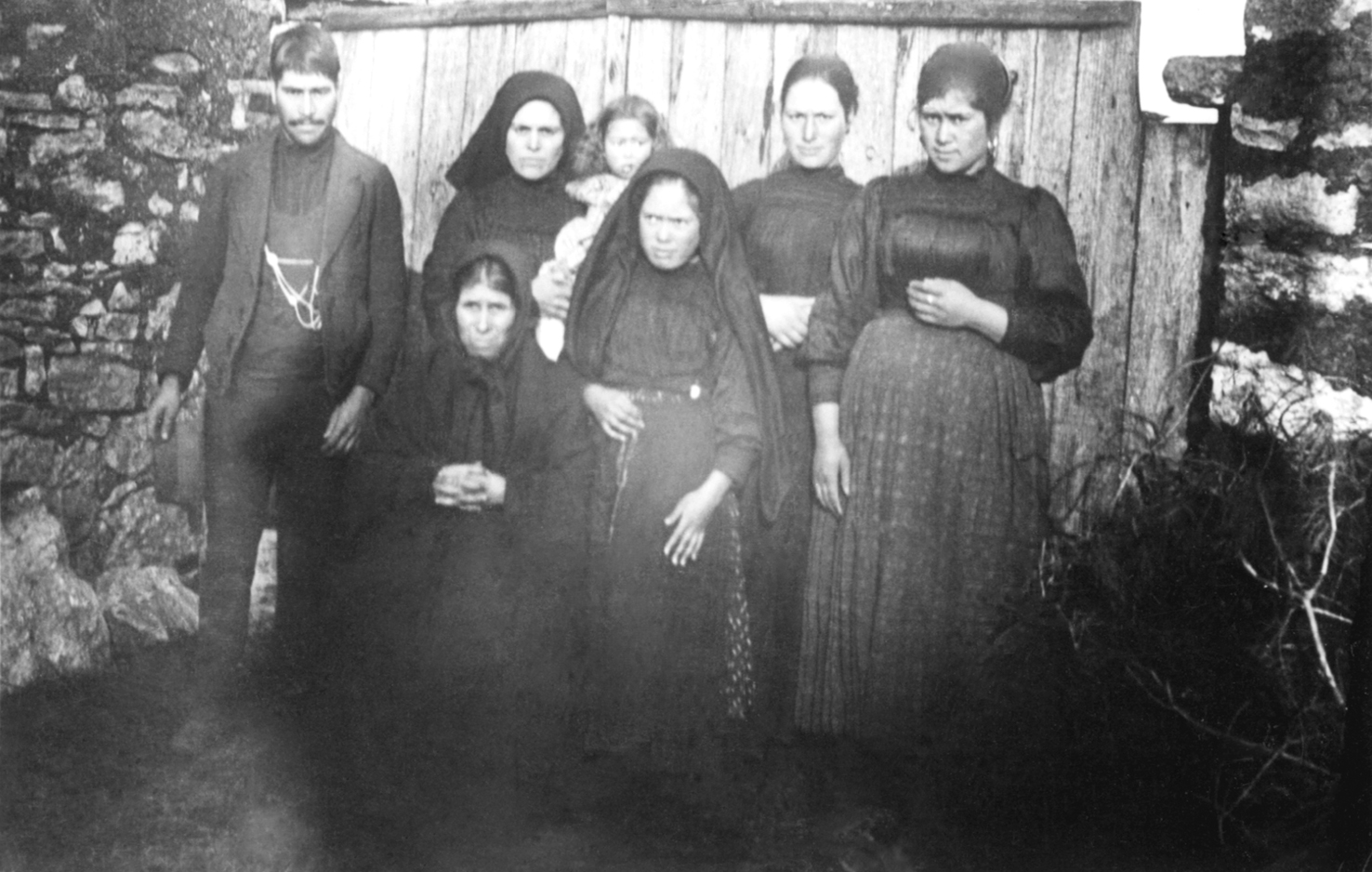
Photograph of Lúcia with her family in 1919. In the foreground: Lúcia with her mother Maria Rosa (1869–1942); in the background, Lúcia's siblings. From left to right: Manuel dos Santos (1895–1977), Maria dos Anjos (1891–1986) with her daughter Glória (1917–1934); Carolina (1902–1992) and Glória de Jesus (1898–1971).

Lúcia's father António, by her report, was a hardworking and generous man who introduced her to Catholicism. Contrary to popular reports, he believed the children when they said they had seen Mary. Lúcia said that her father was not a particularly heavy drinker, but liked to socialize in the tavern. Because of a controversy with the local parish priest, whom he wished to avoid, António went to church in a nearby town. (Note: "As for the drinking, again thanks be to God, it was not as they say, nor as Fr. De Marchi wrote in the first edition of his book, A Lady More Brilliant than the Sun. If my father did sometimes drink a little more than those who drank nothing, he never carried it to the point of creating disorder at home, nor of ill treating his wife and children..." —Lucia's Fifth Memoir, entire text online, page found 6 June 2011.)

Maria Rosa was literate, although she never taught her children to read. She had a taste for religious literature and storytelling. She regularly gave catechism lessons (Note: "Mother was never satisfied with our just being able to repeat the words of our catechism. She tried hard to explain everything so we would really understand the meaning of the words. She used to say that just repeating catechism without understanding was worse than useless." —Maria dos Anjos Santos, in de Marchi's True Story of Fatima Maria dos Anjos was made an official catechist at the age of nine, a testament to her mother's diligence.) to her and the neighbour's children. According to her mother, Lúcia repeated everything that she heard "like a parrot".

De Marchi described her features in the following manner: "She was not a pretty child. The only attractions of her face—which was not on the whole repellent—were her two great black eyes which gazed out from under thick eyebrows. Her hair, thick and dark, was parted in the center over her shoulders. Her nose was rather flat, her lips thick and her mouth large."

Lúcia was a storyteller and composed both sacred and secular songs. She also wrote a poem about Jacinta which appears in her memoirs.

Lúcia received First Communion at six years of age, four years before the usual age. Initially, the parish priest refused to give her Communion so early. But Father Cruz, a Jesuit missionary visiting from Lisbon, interviewed Lúcia after finding her in tears that day and concluded that "she understands what she's doing better than many of the others." After her First Confession she prayed before the altar of Our Lady of the Rosary and claimed to have seen the statue smile at her. It left a deep impact on her: "I lost the taste and attraction for the things of the world, and only felt at home in some solitary place where, all alone, I could recall the delights of my First Communion."

By eight years of age, she was tending the family's sheep, accompanied by other boys and girls of the village.

== Apparitions of Our Lady of Fátima ==
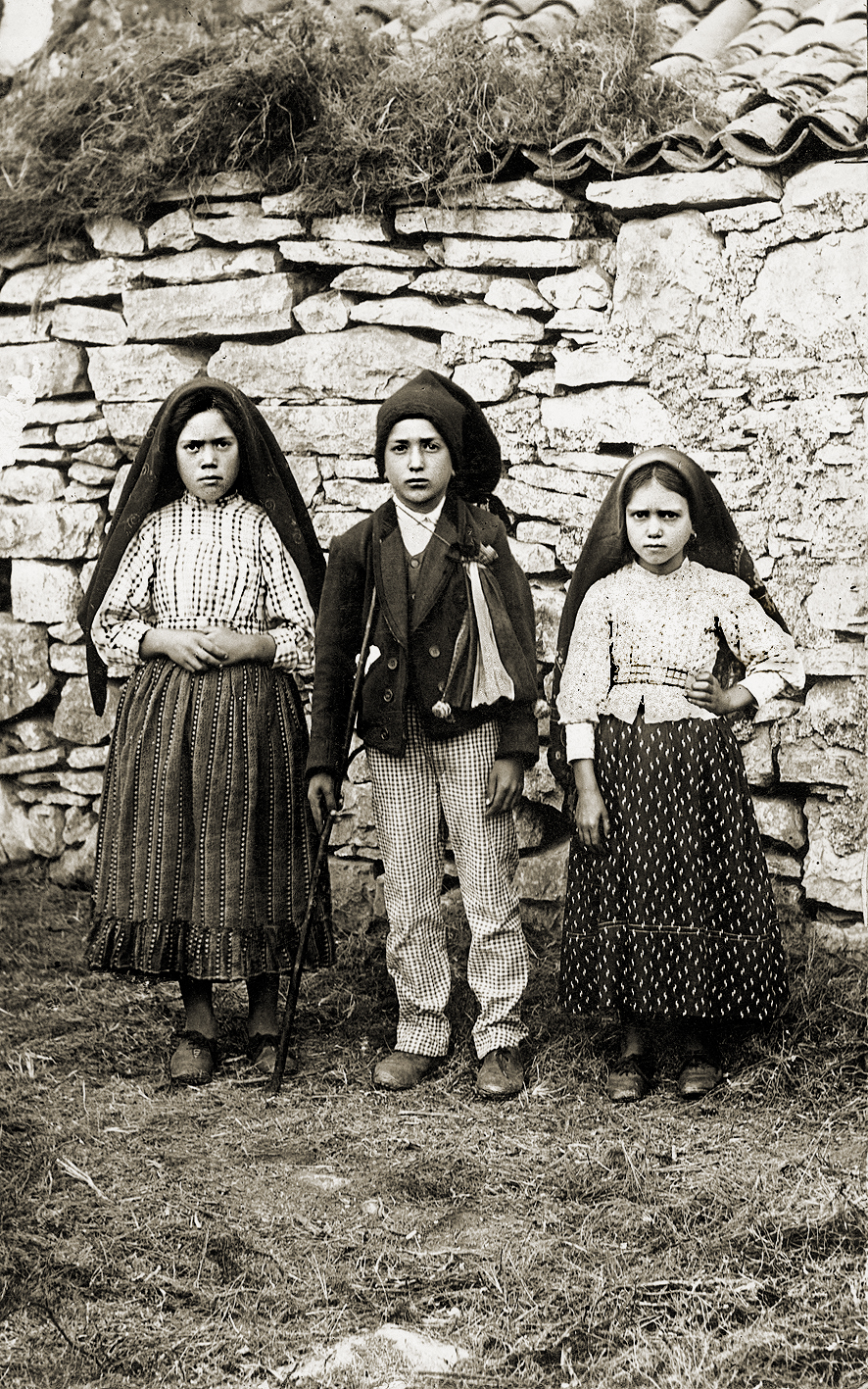
Lúcia dos Santos (left) with fellow visionaries of Our Lady, Francisco and Jacinta Marto

Between May and October 1917, Lúcia and her cousins Francisco and Jacinta Marto reported visions of a luminous lady, who they believed to be the Virgin Mary, in the Cova da Iria fields outside the hamlet of Aljustrel, near Fátima, Portugal. The children said the visitations took place on the 13th day of each month at approximately noon, for six months. The only exception was August, when the children were detained by the local administrator. That month they did not report a vision of the Lady until after they were released from jail, two days later.

According to Lúcia's accounts, the lady told the children to do penance and to make sacrifices to save sinners. Lúcia said that the lady stressed the importance of saying the rosary every day, to bring peace to the world. Many young Portuguese men, including relatives of the visionaries, were then fighting in World War I. Lúcia heard Mary ask her to learn to read and write because Jesus wanted to employ her to convey messages to the world about Mary, particularly the Immaculate Heart of Mary.

Lúcia's mother believed that Lúcia was making up lies to get attention. Although the favorite child until this point, Lúcia suffered beatings and ridicule from her mother, who was especially incredulous of the idea that Lúcia had been asked to learn to read and write.

=== Three Secrets of Fatima ===
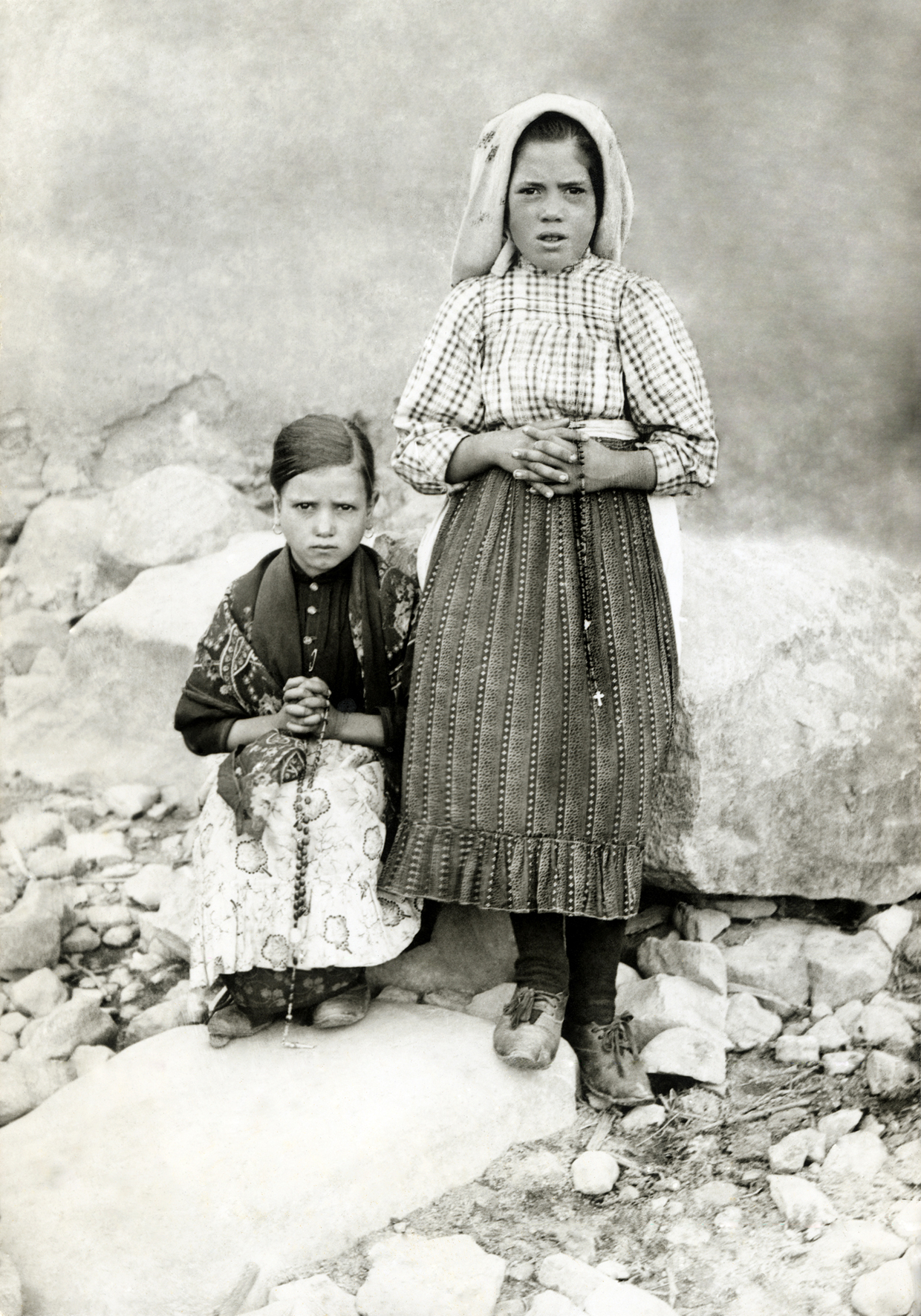
Lúcia (standing) with her cousin, Jacinta Marto, 1917

On 13 July 1917, around noon, the Lady is said to have entrusted the children with three secrets. Two of the secrets were revealed in 1941 in a document written by Lúcia, at the request of the Bishop of Leiria, José Alves Correia da Silva, partly to assist with the publication of a new edition of a book on Jacinta.

When asked by Bishop da Silva in 1943 to reveal the third secret, Lúcia struggled for a short period, being "not yet convinced that God had clearly authorized her to act". She was under strict obedience in accordance with her Carmelite life, and conflicted as to whether she should obey her superiors, or the personal orders she believed were from Mary. However, in October 1943 she fell ill with influenza and pleurisy, the same illness which had killed her cousins, and for a time believed she was about to die. Bishop da Silva ordered her to put the third secret in writing. Lúcia then wrote down the secret and sealed it in an envelope not to be opened until 1960. She designated 1960 because she thought that "by then it will appear clearer." The text of the third secret was officially released by Pope John Paul II in 2000.

The Vatican described the secret as a vision of the 1981 assassination attempt on Pope John Paul II.

=== Miracle of the Sun ===
The visions increasingly received wide publicity, and an estimated 70,000 witnesses were reportedly present for the sixth and final apparition. Lúcia had promised for several months that the Lady would perform a miracle on that day "so that all may believe." Witnesses present in the Cova da Iria that day, as well as some up to 25 miles (40 km) away, reported that the Sun appeared to change colors and rotate, like a wheel of fire, casting off multicolored light across the landscape. The Sun appeared to plunge towards the Earth, frightening many into believing that it was the end of the world. The popular expression, according to the O Século reporter Avelino de Almeida, was that the Sun "danced." The event became known as the Miracle of the Sun. The episode was widely reported by the Portuguese secular media. Some coverage appeared in a small article in the New York Times on 17 October 1917. Lúcia reported that day that the lady identified herself as "Our Lady of the Rosary." She thereafter also became known as Our Lady of Fátima.

On behalf of the Catholic Church, Bishop Da Silva approved the visions as "worthy of belief" on 13 October 1930.

== Life in the convent ==
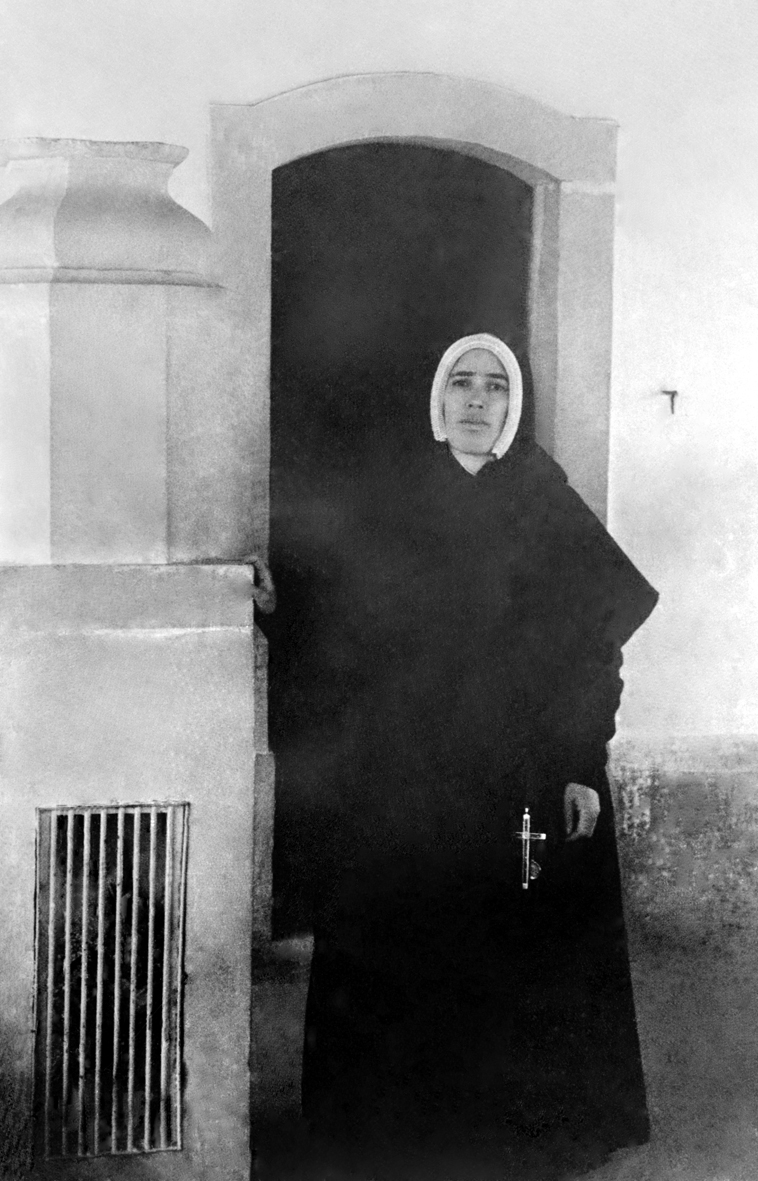
Sister Lúcia in the Chapel of the Apparitions next to the column marking the place where the apparitions of Our Lady are said to have taken place. The picture was taken during Lucia's visit to Cova da Iria on May 22, 1946.

Lúcia moved to Porto in 1921, and at 14 was admitted as a boarder in the school of the Sisters of St. Dorothy in Vilar, on the city's outskirts. On 24 October 1925, she entered the Institute of the Sisters of St. Dorothy as a postulant in the convent in Pontevedra, Spain, just across the northern Portuguese border. According to Sister Lúcia, on 10 December 1925, she experienced a vision of the Holy Virgin and the Christ Child. The Virgin Mary is said to have requested the practice of the Five First Saturdays devotion. If one fulfilled the conditions on the First Saturday of five consecutive months, the Virgin Mary promised special graces at the hour of death.

On 20 July 1926, Lucia moved to Tuy, where she began her novitiate; she received her habit on 2 October of the same year. Lúcia professed her first vows on 3 October 1928. Sister Lucia reported that on 13 June 1929, she had a vision during which the Blessed Virgin told her: "The moment has come in which God asks the Holy Father, in union with all the bishops of the world, to make the consecration of Russia to my Immaculate Heart, promising to save it by this means." She made her perpetual vows on 3 October 1934, receiving the name "Sister Maria das Dores" (Mary of the Sorrows).

On 25 January 1938, a massive aurora borealis, described variously as "a curtain of fire" and a "huge blood-red beam of light", appeared in the skies over Europe and was visible as far away as Gibraltar and even parts of the United States. Lúcia believed this event was the "night illuminated by a strange light in the sky" which she had heard Mary speak about as part of the Second Secret, predicting the events which would lead to the Second World War and requesting Acts of Reparation including the First Saturday Devotions along with the Consecration of Russia.

She returned to Portugal in 1946 (where she visited Fátima incognito), and in March 1948, after receiving special papal permission, entered the Carmelite convent of Santa Teresa in Coimbra, where she resided until her death. She made her profession as a Discalced Carmelite on 31 May 1949, taking the religious name Maria Lúcia of Jesus and the Immaculate Heart.

Because of the constitutions of the community, Lúcia was expected to "converse as little as possible with persons from without, even with their nearest relatives, unless their conversation be spiritual, and even then it should be very seldom and as brief as possible" (Note: Rule and Constitutions of the Discalced Nuns of the Blessed Virgin Mary of Mount Carmel (1990), paragraph 27. While this document was binding for Sr. Lúcia only at the end of her life, it is based on the Constitutions of St. Teresa of Jesus, which were written in the 16th century.) and "have nothing to do with worldly affairs, nor speak of them". (Note: Rule and Constitutions of the Discalced Nuns of the Blessed Virgin Mary of Mount Carmel (1990), paragraph 23. See also, paragraphs 212–214 on the strict nature of the cloister. It is quite unusual that, as a nun of her Order, Sr. Lúcia was able to produce any public writings at all.) This has led some people to believe in a conspiracy to cover up the Fátima message and silence Lúcia.

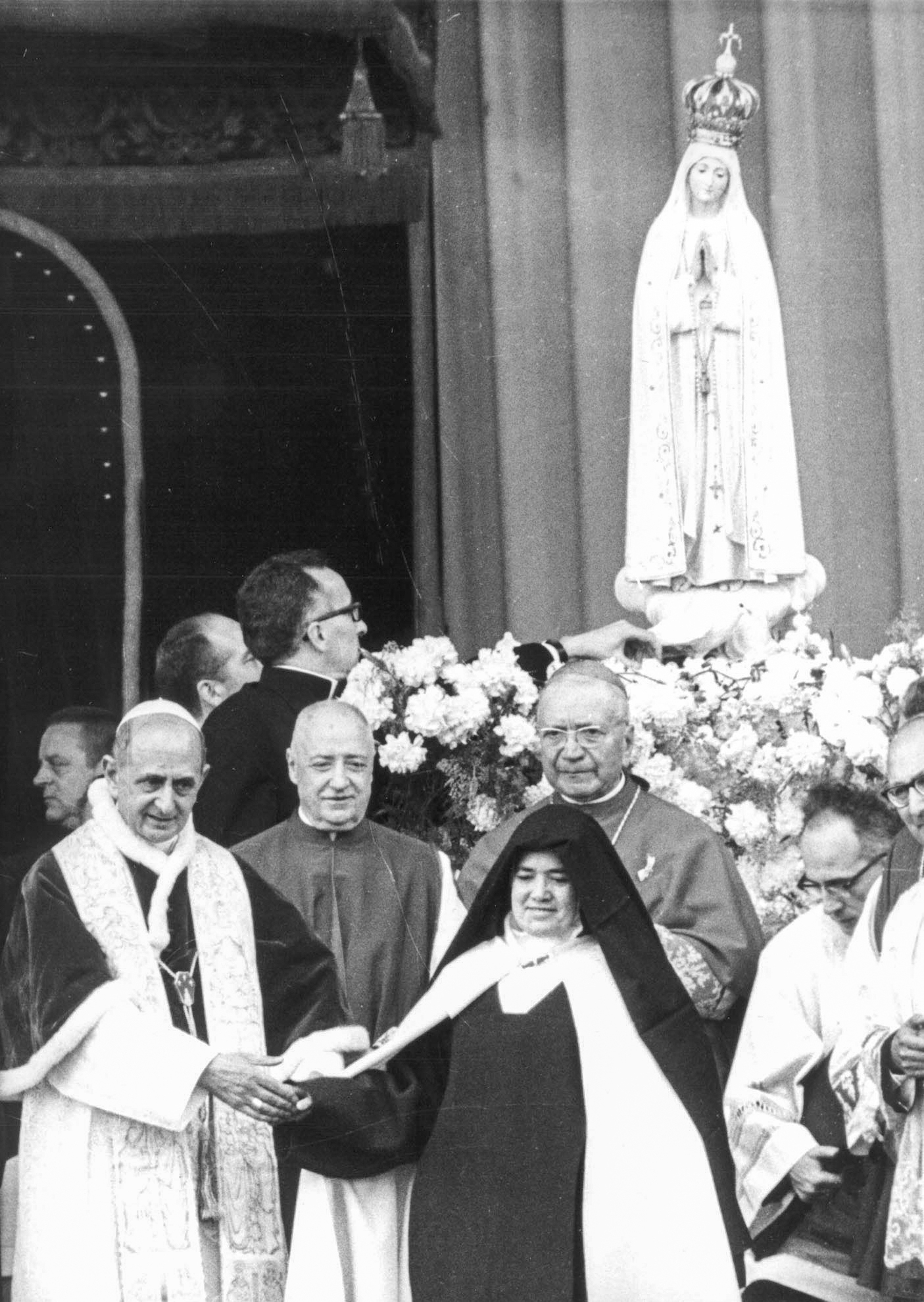
Pope Paul VI with Sister Lúcia in 1967

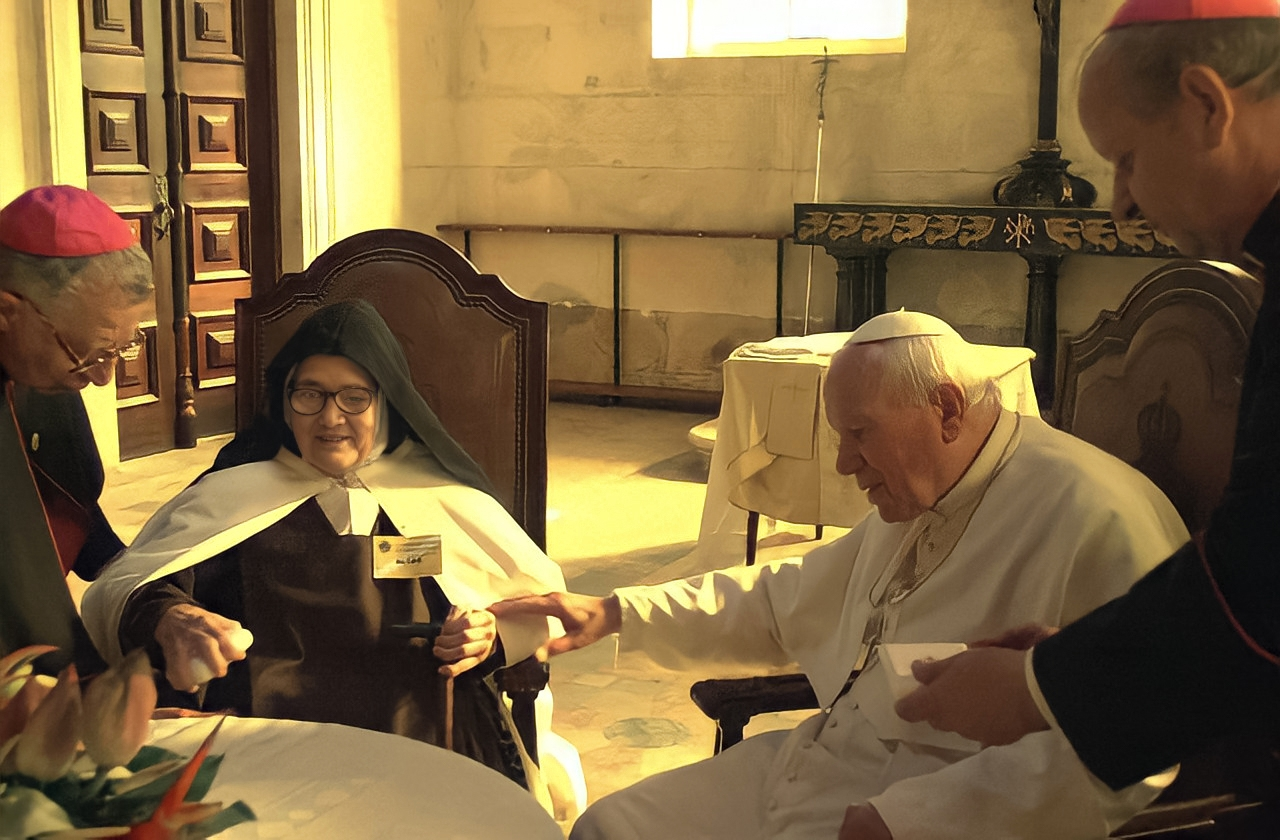
Meeting of Sister Lúcia with Pope John Paul II in the Sanctuary of Fátima on 13 May 2000

She came back to Fátima on the occasion of four papal pilgrimages – all on 13 May – firstly by Paul VI in 1967, and John Paul II in 1982 (in thanksgiving for surviving an assassination attempt the previous year), 1991, and 2000 when her cousins Jacinta and Francisco were beatified.

== Writings ==
=== Memoirs ===
Sister Lúcia wrote six memoirs during her lifetime. The first four were written between 1935 and 1941, and the English translation is published under the name Fatima in Lucia's Own Words. The fifth and six memoirs, written in 1989 and 1993, are published in English under the name Fatima in Lucia's Own Words II.

An additional book was published in 2001, variously known as Calls from the Message of Fatima and Appeals from the Message of Fatima, as announced by the Vatican on 5 December 2001.

=== Letters ===
Sister Lúcia also wrote numerous letters to clergy and devout laypeople who were curious about the Third Secret of Fátima and about Lúcia's interpretation of what she had heard Virgin Mary request. (Note: Some examples of these letters are reprinted in The Whole Truth About Fatima, particularly in Volume 4, Fatima and John Paul I.) Two letters she supposedly wrote concerned the Consecration of Russia, in which she said Our Lady's request had been fulfilled. All materials written by Sister Lúcia are now held for study by the Congregation for the Causes of Saints.

== Illness and death ==
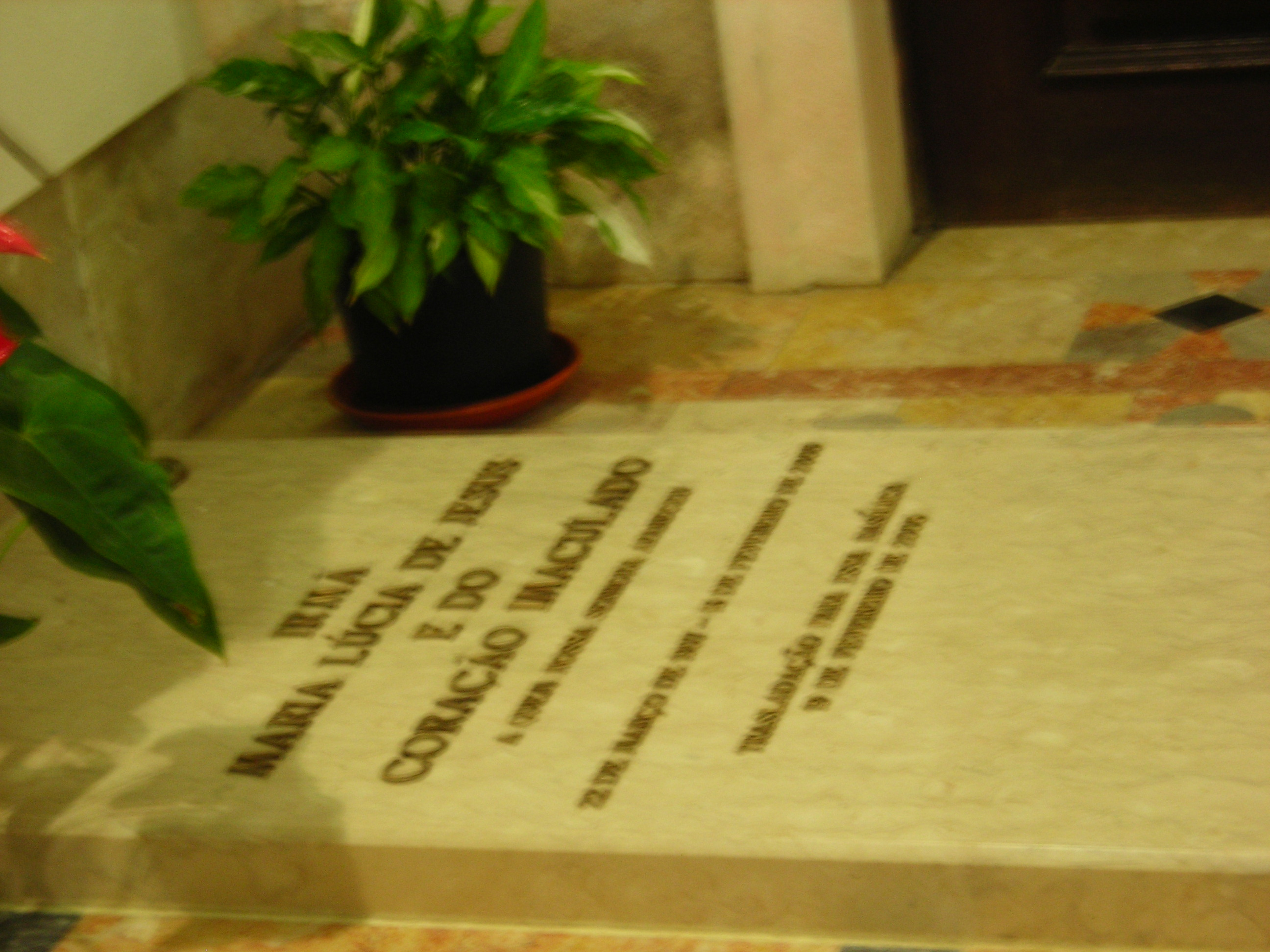
The tomb of Sister Lúcia de Jesus Rosa dos Santos in Fátima, Portugal

Sister Lúcia had been blind, deaf, and ailing for some years prior to her death at age 97. She died on 13 February 2005, at the Carmelite convent of Santa Teresa in Coimbra, where she had lived since 1948.

== Beatification process ==
On 13 February 2008 (the third anniversary of her death), Pope Benedict XVI announced that in the case of Sister Lúcia he would waive the five-year waiting period established by canon law before opening a cause for beatification. On 13 February 2017, Sister Lúcia was accorded the title Servant of God, the first major step toward her beatification. In October 2022, the “Positio on the Life, Virtues and Reputation for Holiness of Sister Lucia de Jesus dos Santos” was presented at the Vatican for the Congregation of the Causes of Saints to examine, to see whether she lived a life of 'heroic virtue'. She was declared venerable by Pope Francis on June 22, 2023.

== In popular culture ==
Lúcia is played by Susan Whitney in the 1952 film The Miracle of Our Lady of Fatima.

Felipa Fernandes played her in The 13th Day, a straight-to-video feature film produced by Natasha Howes and directed by Dominic and Ian Higgins.

In the 2020 film Fatima, Lúcia is played by Stephanie Gil as the young seer and by Sônia Braga as an adult.

== See also ==
- A Pathway Under the Gaze of Mary: Biography of Sister Lúcia
- First Saturdays Devotion
- Sanctuary of the Apparitions
