= Fatima (2020 film) =

Film by Marco Pontecorvo

Fátima
- Theatrical poster
- Directed by: Marco Pontecorvo
- Screenplay by: Barbara Nicolosi; Marco Pontecorvo; Valerio D'Annunzio
- Story by: Barbara Nicolosi
- Produced by: Gerardo Fernandes; James T. Volk; Dick Lyles; Stefano Buono; Maribel Lopera Sierra; Marco Pontecorvo; Rose Ganguzza; Natasha Howes
- Starring: Joaquim de Almeida; Goran Višnjić; Stephanie Gil; Alejandra Howard; Jorge Lamelas; Lúcia Moniz; Marco d'Almeida; Joana Ribeiro; Harvey Keitel; Sônia Braga
- Cinematography: Vincenzo Carpineta
- Edited by: Alessio Doglione
- Music by: Paolo Buonvino
- Production companies: Origin Entertainment; Elysia Productions; Rose Pictures
- Distributed by: Picturehouse
- Release date: August 28, 2020
- Countries: Portugal; United States
- Language: English
- Budget: $17 Million
- Box office: $1.5 Million

Fátima is a 2020 faith-based drama film directed by Marco Pontecorvo. It stars Joaquim de Almeida, Goran Višnjić, Harvey Keitel, Sônia Braga, Stephanie Gil, Alejandra Howard, Jorge Lamelas and Lúcia Moniz.

The film, based on Our Lady of Fátima, features the original song "Gratia Plena" ("Full of Grace"), performed by Andrea Bocelli and composed by Italian composer Paolo Buonvino.

== Plot ==
A 10-year-old shepherd, Lúcia dos Santos, and her two young cousins, Francisco and Jacinta Marto, report having received apparitions of the Blessed Virgin Mary in Fátima, Portugal, circa 1917. Their revelations inspire believers but anger officials of both the Catholic Church and the secular government, who try to force them to recant their story. As word of their prophecy spreads, tens of thousands of religious pilgrims flock to the site to witness what became known as the Miracle of the Sun.

== Cast ==
- Joaquim de Almeida as Father Ferreira
- Goran Višnjić as Artur de Oliveira Santos
- Stephanie Gil as young Lúcia dos Santos
  - Sônia Braga as Sister Lúcia (Lúcia dos Santos later in life)
- Alejandra Howard as Lúcia's cousin Jacinta Marto
- Jorge Lamelas as Lúcia's cousin Francisco Marto
- Lúcia Moniz as Maria Rosa
- Marco d'Almeida as António
- Joana Ribeiro as the Virgin Mary
- Harvey Keitel as Professor Nichols

== Production ==
=== Development ===
Pontecorvo's first feature directorial credit was the drama Pa-ra-da. His cinematography credits include work on HBO's Game of Thrones and Rome.

Bob Berney and Jeanne R. Berney, co-heads of the film label Picturehouse, acquired the North American rights to the film in 2019. The Berneys made the deal with James T. Volk, chairman and founder of Origin Entertainment, which produced the film in collaboration with Elysia Productions and Rose Pictures. While at Newmarket Films, Bob Berney released and oversaw the marketing strategy for Mel Gibson's 2004 film The Passion of the Christ.

=== Filming ===
In May 2017 the production filmed the 100th Year Anniversary Mass in Fátima, celebrated by Pope Francis, and portions of the footage are used in the end credit sequence. Principal photography began in September 2018 and the film was entirely shot on location in Portugal. Scenes were filmed in Fátima, Sesimbra, Cidadelhe (Pinhel), Tomar, Coimbra and Tapada de Mafra.

== Release ==
Fatima was released in 215 theaters and digitally through Premium Video on demand on August 28, 2020, by Picturehouse. Originally scheduled to release on April 24, it was later postponed until August 14, 2020, and again until August 28, due to the ongoing COVID-19 pandemic.

On May 7, 2021, it opened in 380 AMC Theatres via their $5 Fan Faves deal.

== Reception ==
On Rotten Tomatoes, the film has an approval rating of 57% based on 53 reviews with an average rating of 6/10. The website's critical consensus read, "Hard not to respect but difficult to love, Fatima competently dramatizes an incredible true story." On Metacritic it has a score of 50% based on reviews from 14 critics, indicating "mixed or average" reviews.

Richard Roeper of the Chicago Sun-Times gave the film a positive review and wrote: "In the flourishing genre of faith-based movies, this is one of the better efforts we've seen." Peter Debruge of Variety wrote: "While not especially artful, Fatima honors those who stand by their convictions. That its role models are children makes the message all the more remarkable."

== See also ==
- 2020 in film
- The Miracle of Our Lady of Fatima, 1952 film
- The Song of Bernadette, 1943 film
