= Chapel of the Apparitions =

Catholic church in Portugal

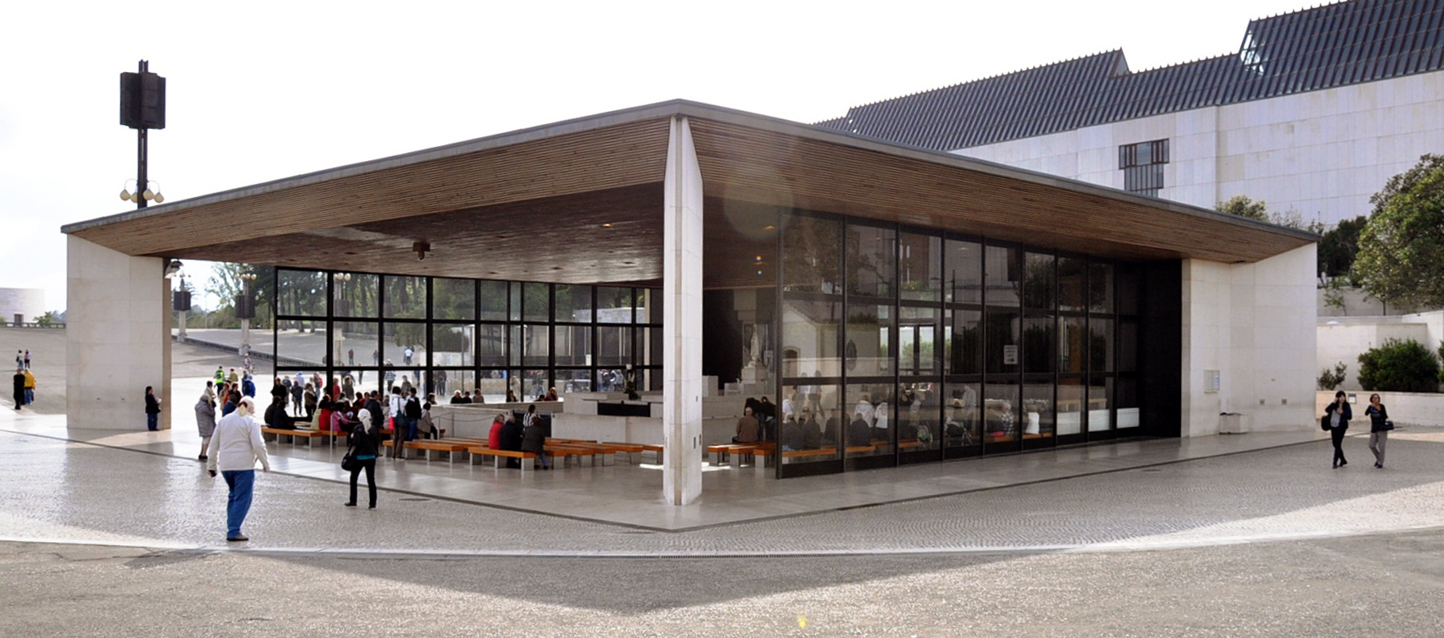
The Chapel of the Apparitions in Cova da Iria (Fátima, Portugal)

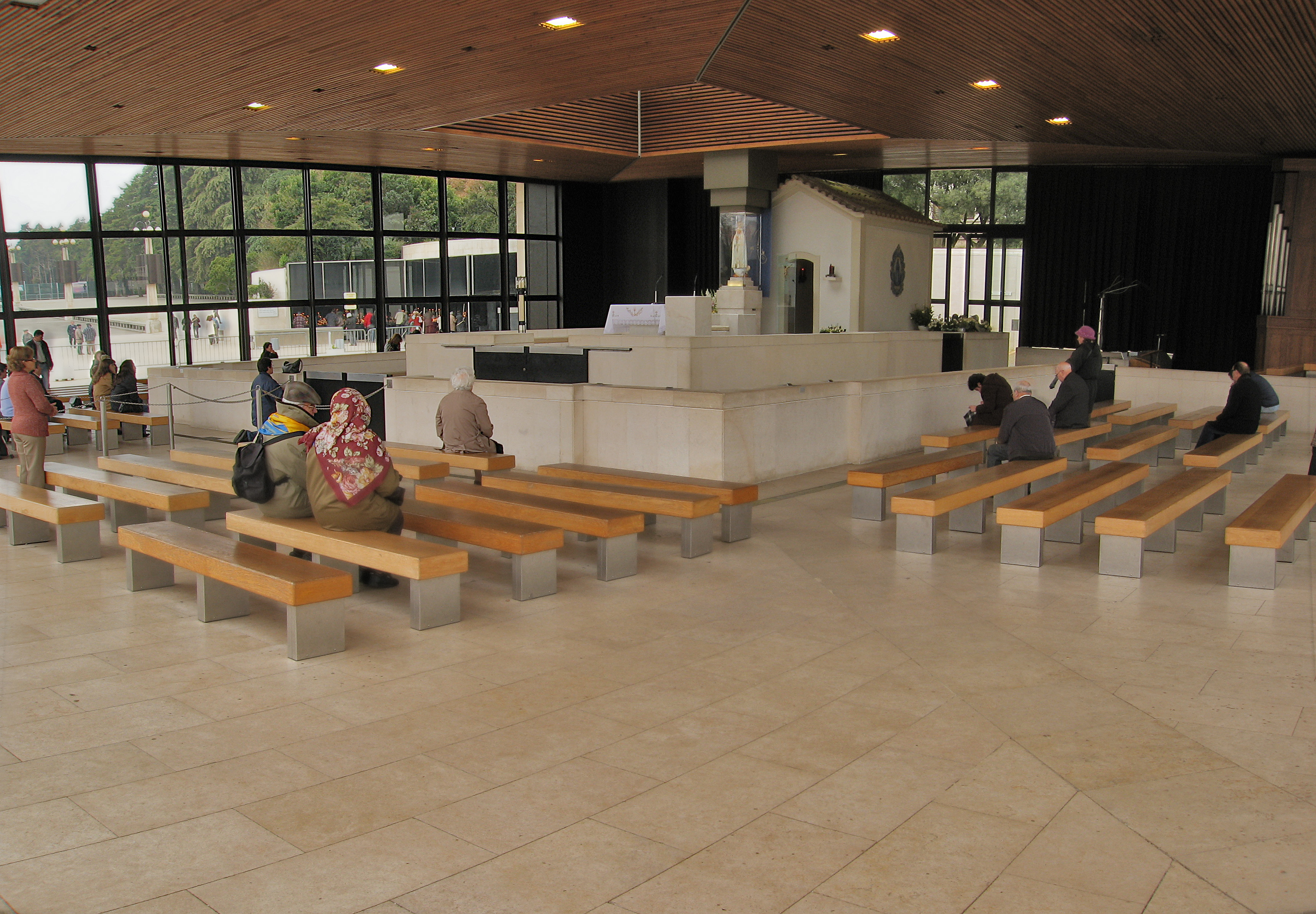
The Chapel of the Apparitions in Cova da Iria (Fátima, Portugal)

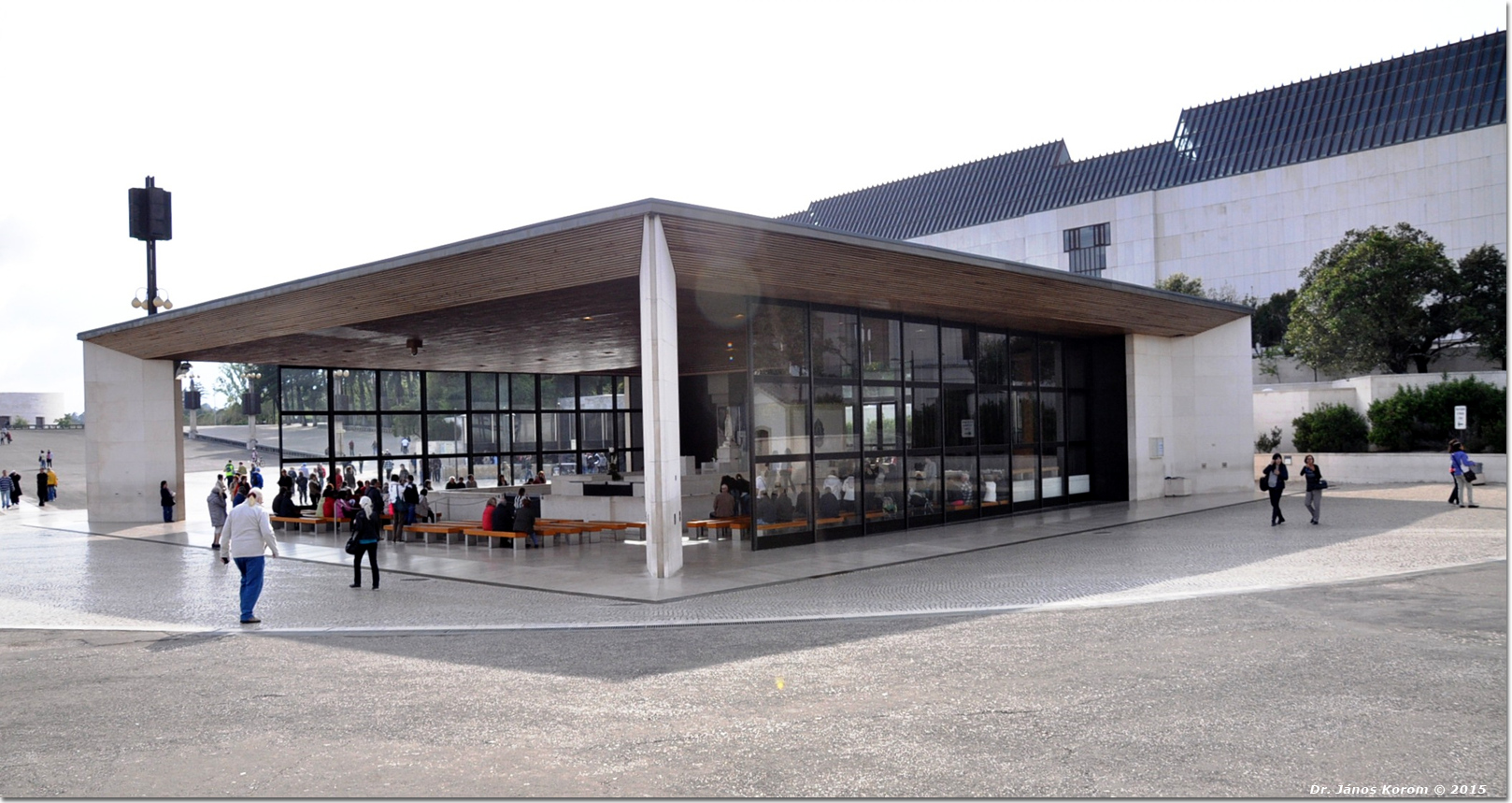
Exterior view of the Chapel of the Apparitions (Sanctuary of Fátima).

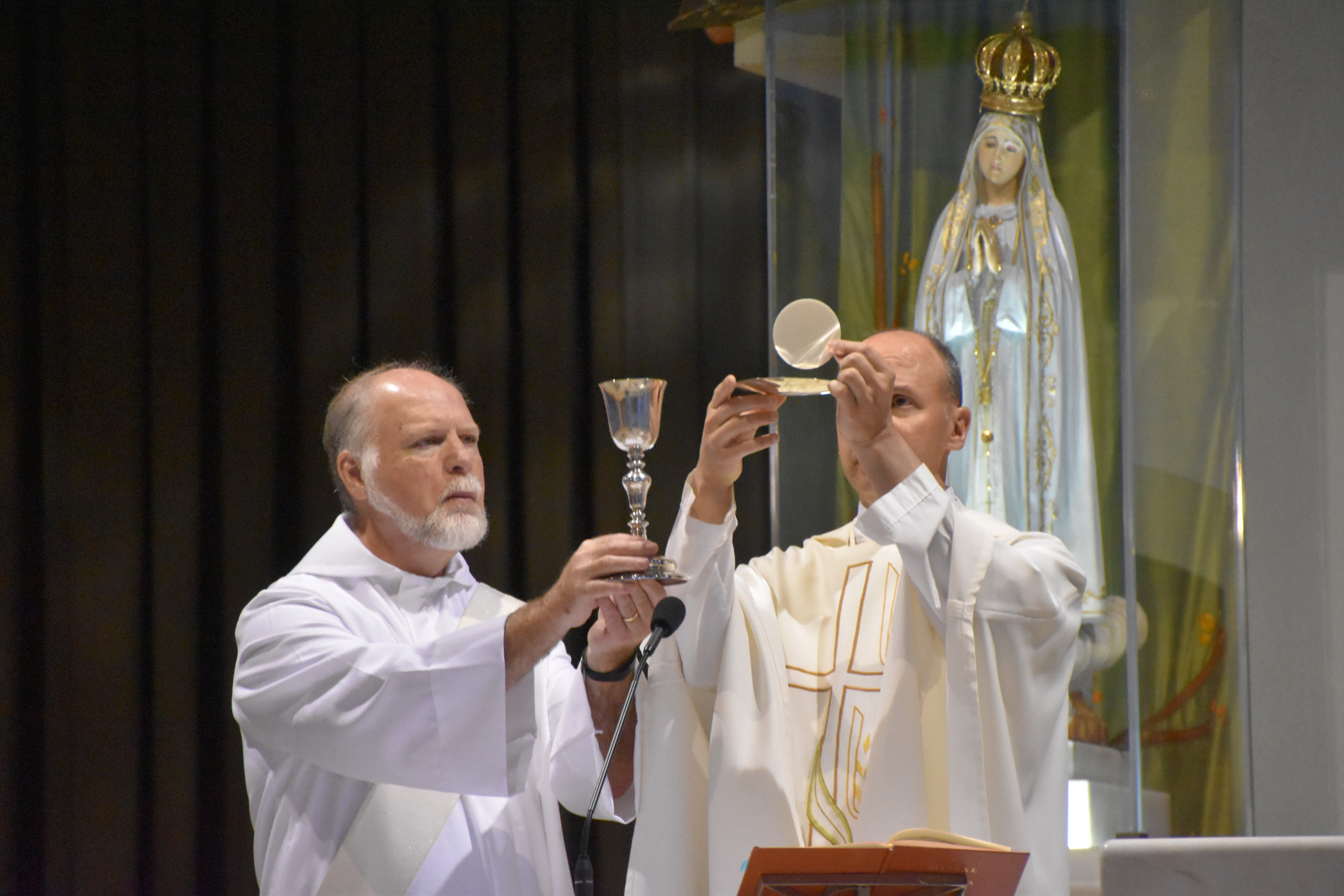
Mass at the Sanctuary of Our Lady of Fátima

The Chapel of the Apparitions (Portuguese: Capelinha das Aparições) is a small chapel located in Cova da Iria that was first constructed in 1919, and again in the early 1920s, to mark the exact location where three little shepherd children reported having received the famous apparitions of the Blessed Virgin Mary in Fátima, Portugal.

== History ==
The chapel was built in response to the demand of the Virgin as Our Lady of the Rosary (since titled Our Lady of Fátima) to the three little shepherds (Lúcia, Francisco and Jacinta): "I want you to make a chapel here in my honour". The chapel was built on the exact spot of the apparitions in Fátima in 1917, as half-remembered by Lúcia. From 28 April to 15 June 1919, the task of building the Chapel fell to the mason Joaquim Barbeiro from the village of Santa Catarina da Serra. On 13 October 1921, the celebration of Mass was officially allowed by the local bishop for the first time next to the Chapel.

In 1919, construction of the Chapel began with permission of Lúcia's mother, and the loudly publicized yet discreet acquiescence of the parish priest of Fátima, who could not commit himself until the bishop issued canonical permission abiding pronouncement on the whole matter, which soon came.

On 6 March 1922, anticlerical elements planted a powerful bomb inside the unfinished Chapel, the explosion heavily damaging it. Later that year in December, construction of the Chapel restarted. On 23 October 1922, as reported by the daily newspaper Diário de Notícias, a group of people from the county seat of Ourém went to the Cova, intent on cutting down the holm-oak on which the Virgin appeared. When Lúcia heard of it, she ran to the location and much to her joy, she saw they had killed the wrong tree. They had felled one which was close to the actual holm-oak, which still stood alone in the center of a clearing.

The Chapel is part of the Sanctuary of Our Lady of Fátima and is visited at least by 6 million pilgrims every year.

== Gallery ==
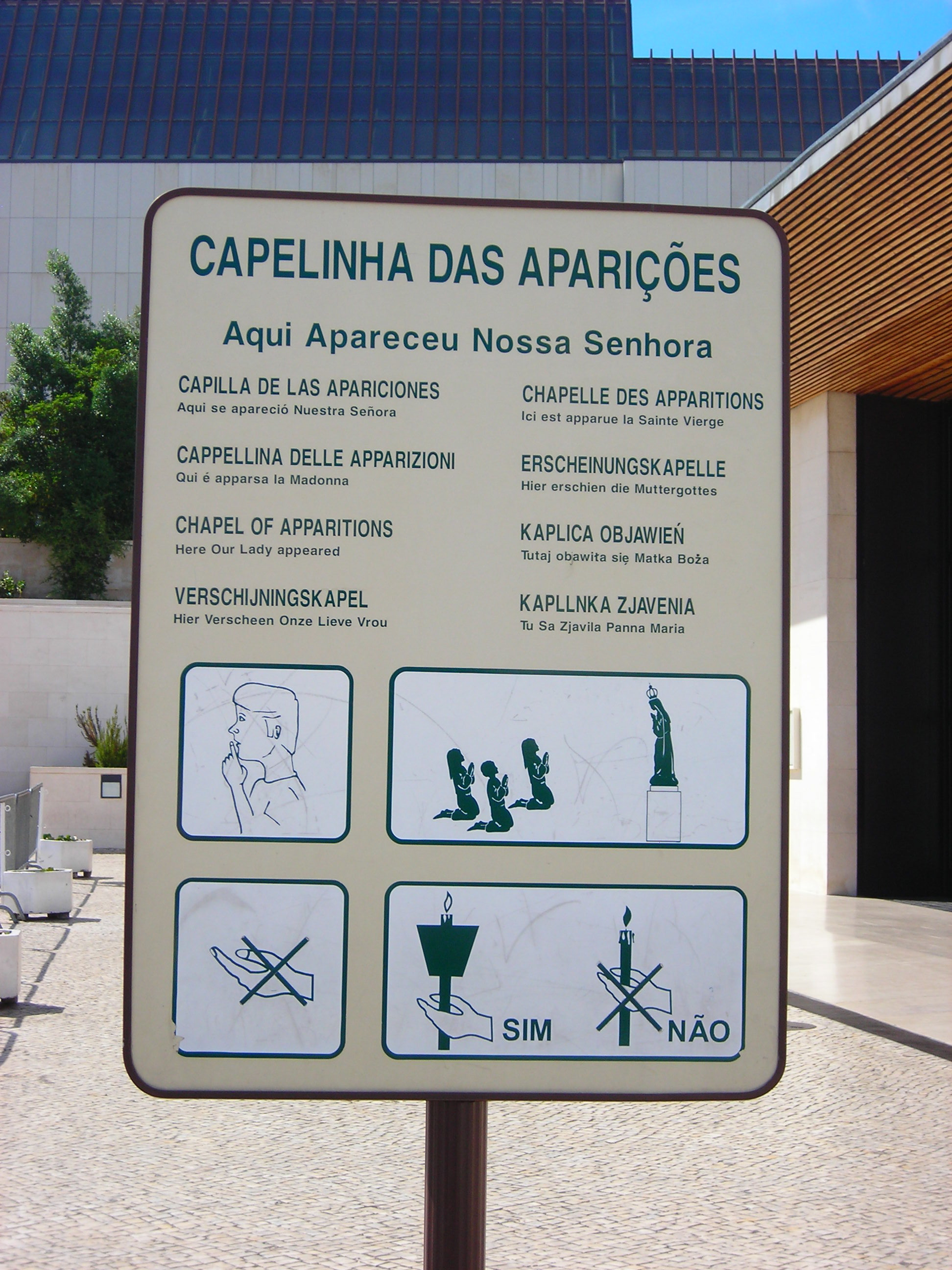
Multilingual information signboard outside the Chapel

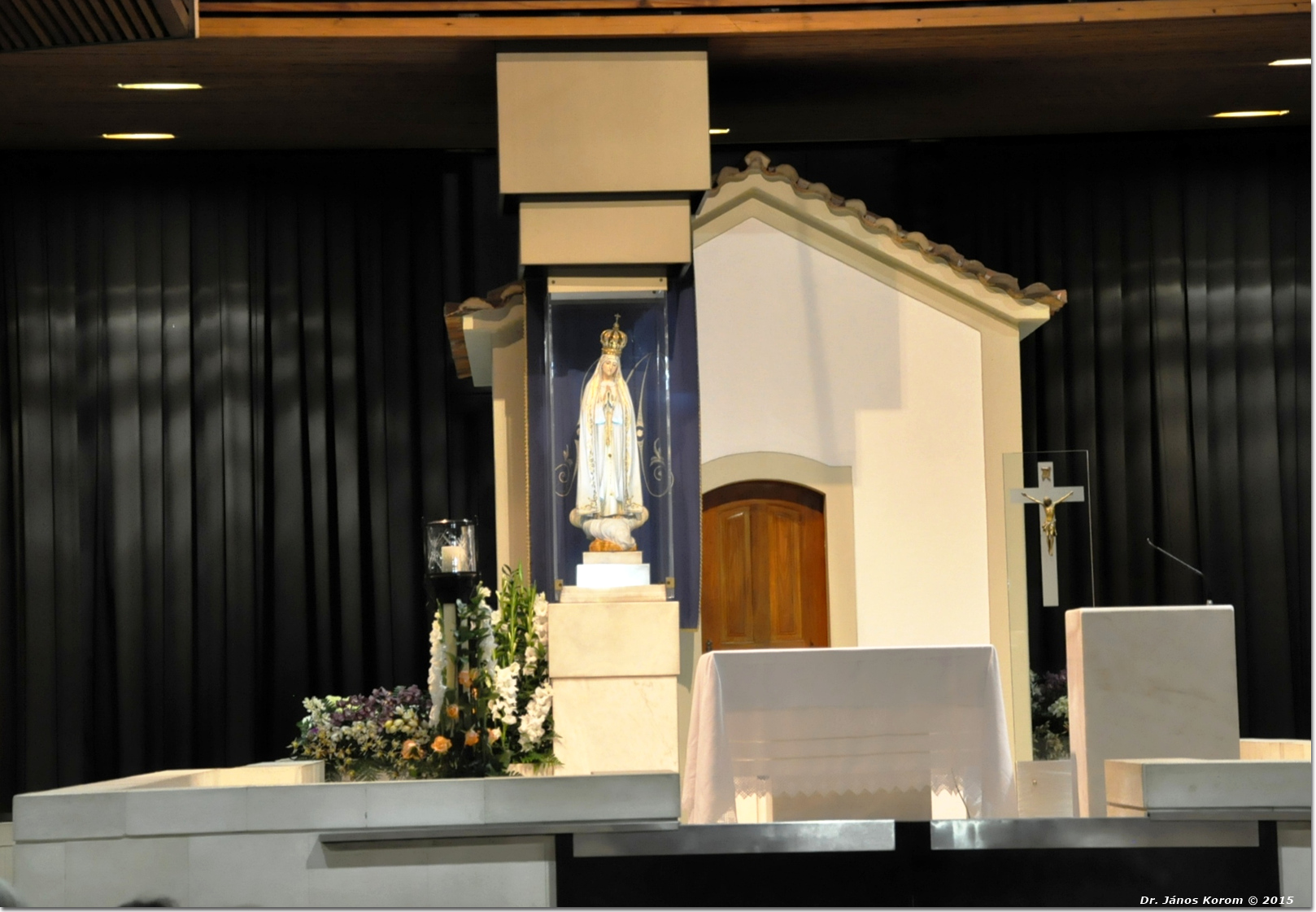
Chapel of the Apparitions with Our Lady's image

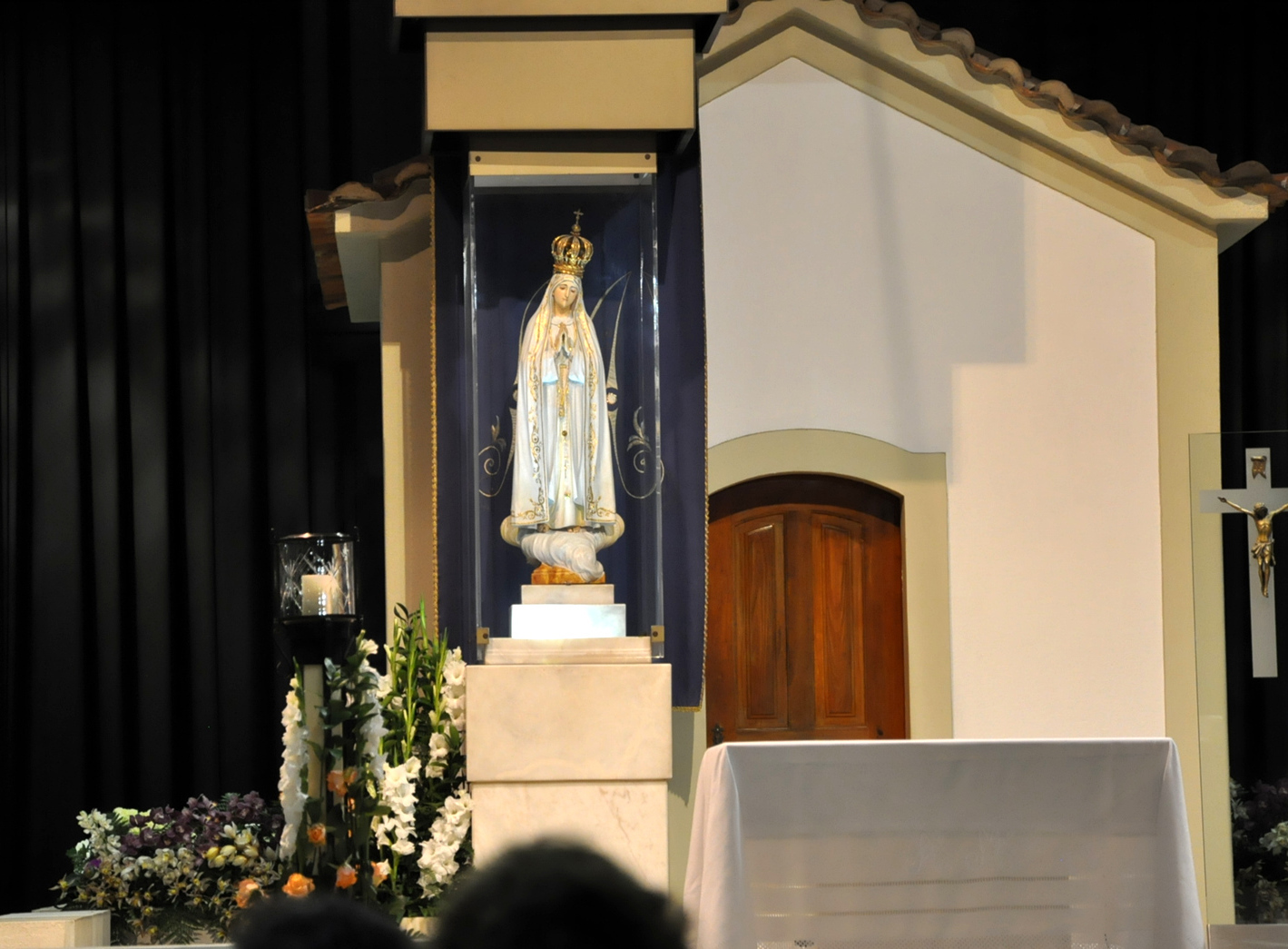
Closeup of the altar and the Virgin’s image

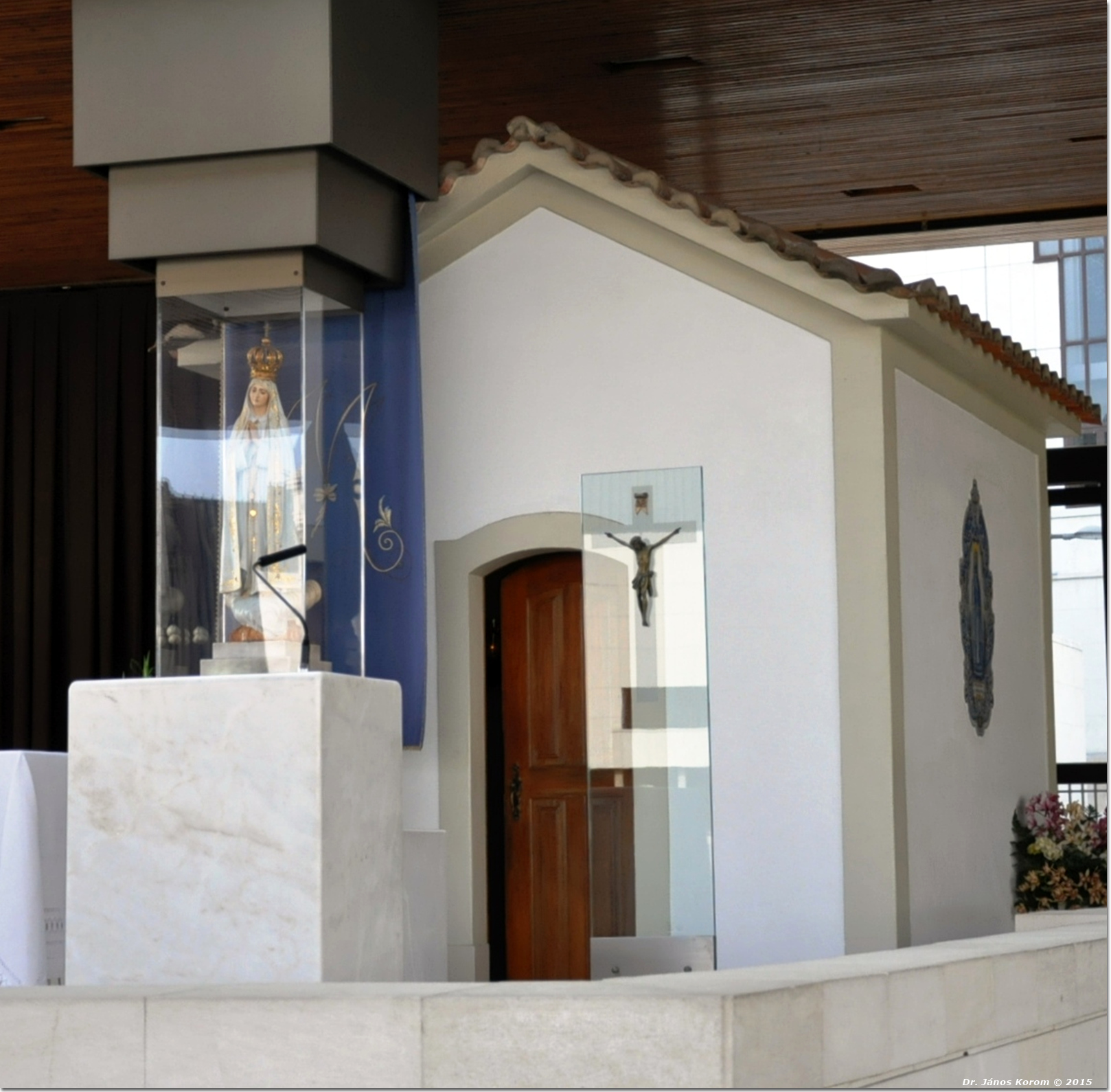
Chapel of the Apparitions with Our Lady's image

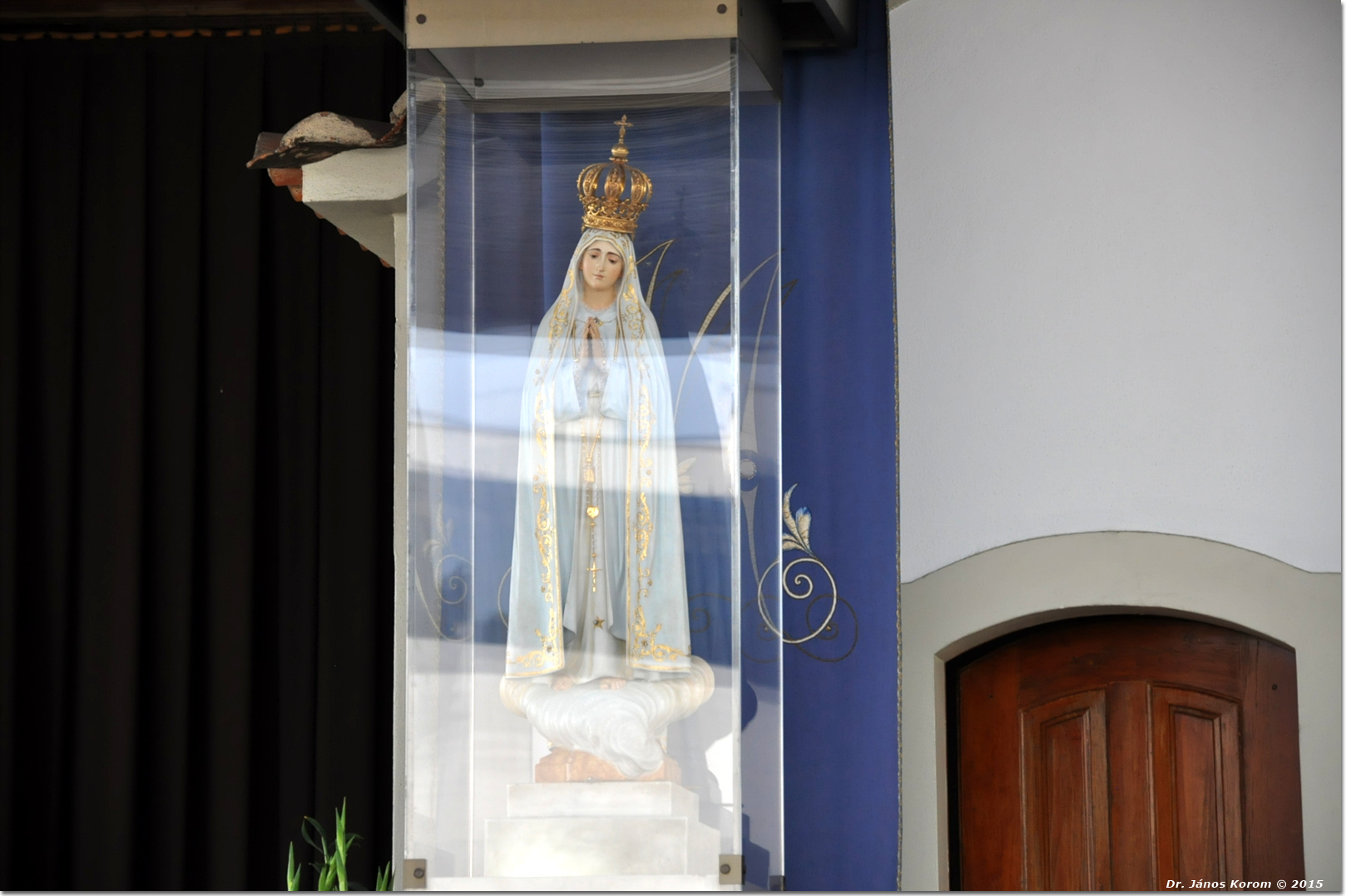
Virgin Mary's image in the Chapel of the Apparitions
