= Francisco and Jacinta Marto =

Portuguese visionaries and Catholic saints

Saints Francisco and Jacinta Marto
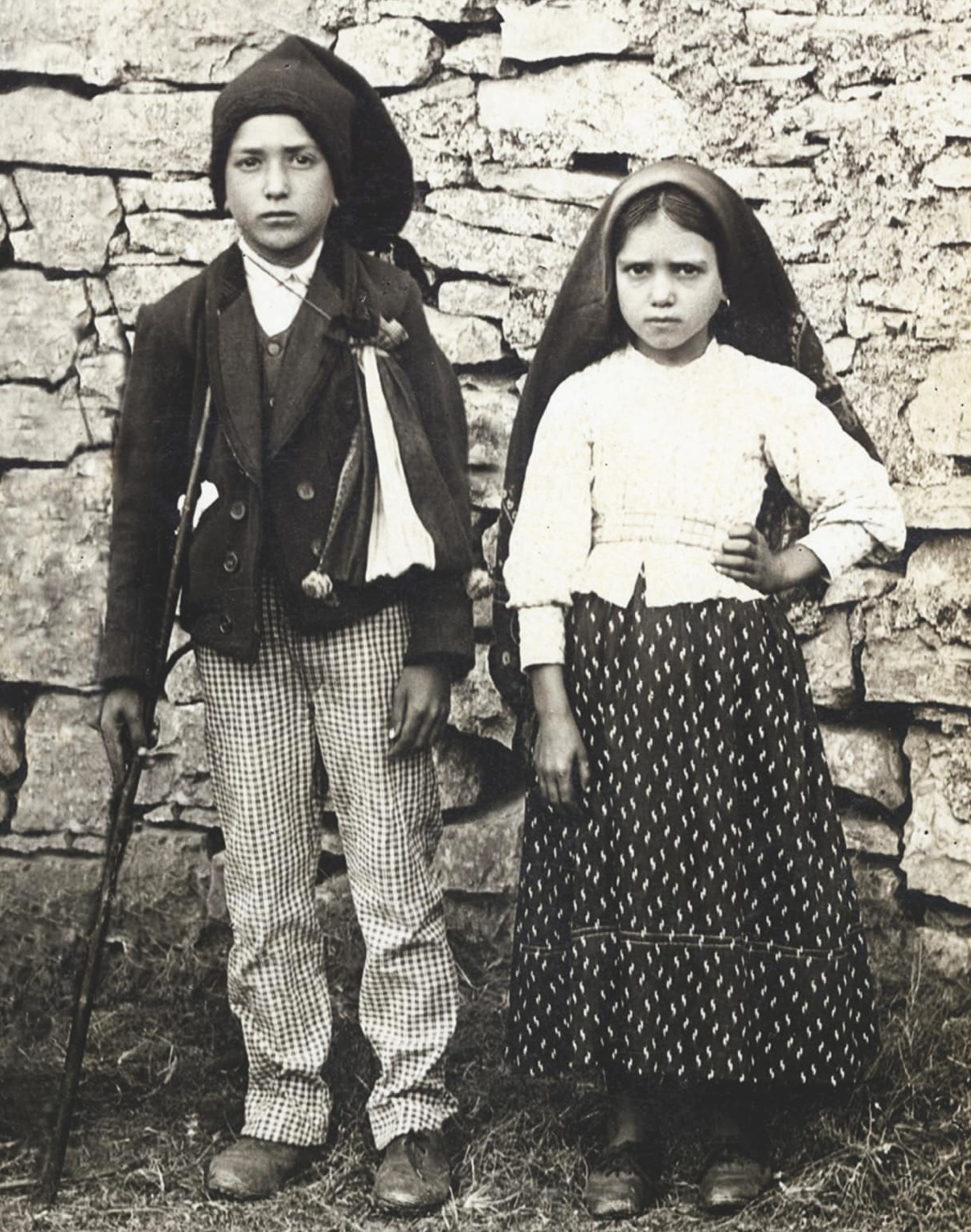
- Photograph of Francisco and Jacinta taken by Joshua Benoliel, c. October 1917
- Born: Francisco: 11 June 1908; Jacinta: 5 March 1910; Aljustrel, Fátima, Ourém, Kingdom of Portugal
- Died: Francisco: 4 April 1919 (aged 10); Aljustrel, Fátima, Portugal; Jacinta: 20 February 1920 (aged 9); Queen Stephanie's Hospital, Lisbon, Portugal
- Cause of death: Francisco: Influenza (commonly known as the flu); Jacinta: Pleurisy (a.k.a. Pleuritis, Pleurosis & pleuritic chest pain)
- Venerated in: Catholic Church
- Beatified: 13 May 2000, Basilica of Our Lady of the Rosary, Fátima, Portugal by Pope John Paul II
- Canonized: 13 May 2017, Basilica of Our Lady of the Rosary, Fátima, Portugal by Pope Francis
- Major shrine: Basilica of Our Lady of the Rosary, Fátima, Portugal
- Feast: 20 February

Francisco de Jesus Marto (11 June 1908 – 4 April 1919) and Jacinta de Jesus Marto (5 March 1910 – 20 February 1920) were siblings from Aljustrel, a small hamlet near Fátima, Portugal, who, with their cousin Lúcia dos Santos (1907–2005), reportedly witnessed three apparitions of the Angel of Peace in 1916, and several apparitions of the Blessed Virgin Mary at Cova da Iria in 1917. The title Our Lady of Fátima was given to the Virgin Mary as a result, and the Sanctuary of Fátima became a major centre of global Catholic pilgrimage.

The two Marto children were solemnly canonized by Pope Francis at the Sanctuary of Our Lady of Fátima, in Portugal, on 13 May 2017, the centennial of the first Apparition of Our Lady of Fátima. They are the youngest Catholic saints, with Jacinta being the youngest saint who did not die a martyr.

== Life ==
The youngest children of Manuel and Olimpia Marto, Francisco and Jacinta were typical of Portuguese village children of that time. They were illiterate.

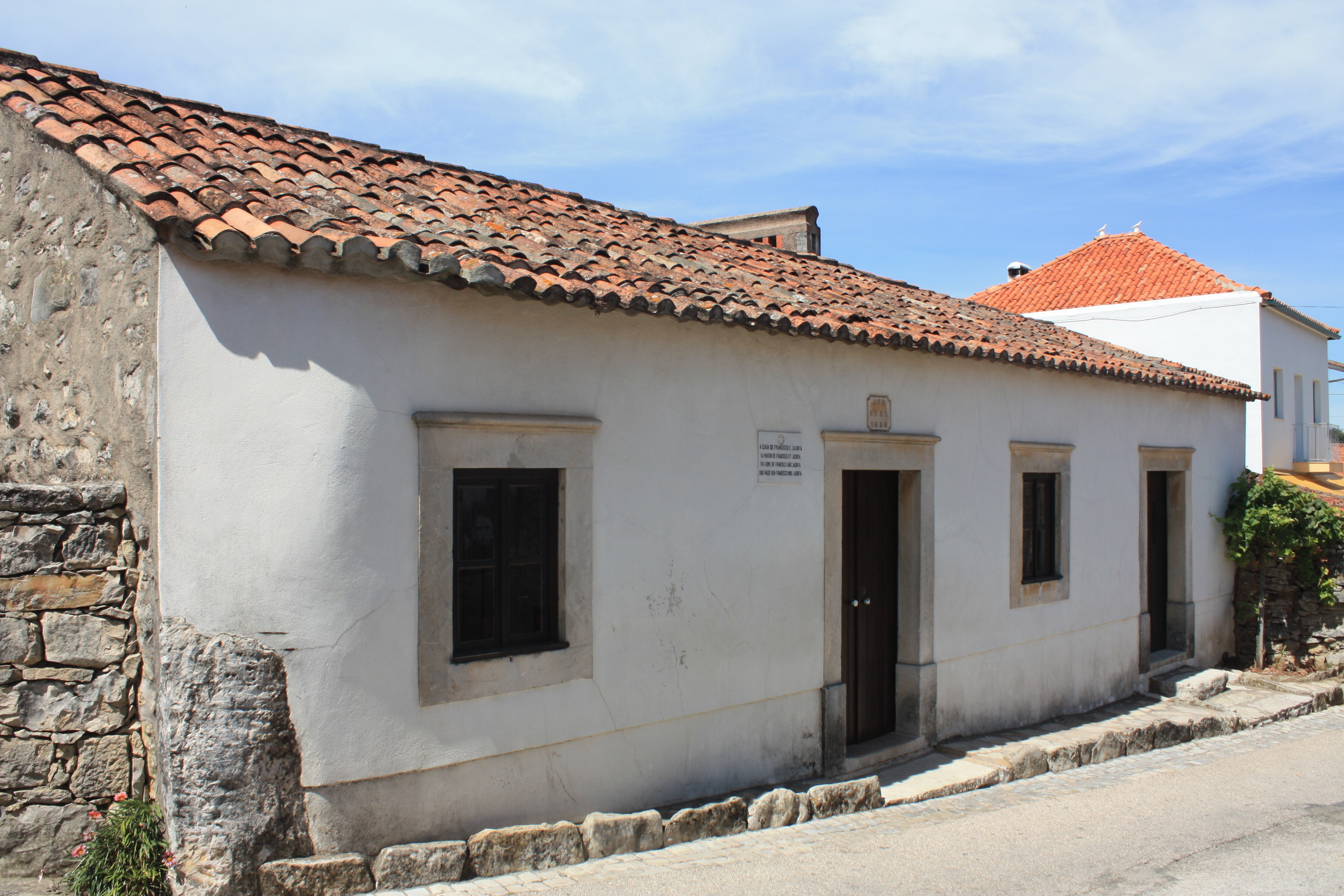
The birthplace of Francisco and Jacinta in Aljustrel, Fátima

According to the memoirs of their cousin Sister Lúcia, Francisco had a placid disposition, was somewhat musically inclined, and liked to be by himself to think. Jacinta was affectionate with a sweet singing voice and a gift for dancing. Following their experiences, their fundamental personalities remained the same. Francisco preferred to pray alone. Jacinta said she was deeply affected by a terrifying vision of Hell shown to the children at the third apparition, and deeply convinced of the need to save sinners through penance and sacrifice as the Virgin had told the children to do. All three children, but particularly Francisco and Jacinta, practiced stringent self-mortifications to this end. The Congregation for the Causes of Saints, in the report that confirmed Jacinta as beatified, observed that she seemed to have an "insatiable hunger for immolation." By this the Congregation was referring to immolation as offering in sacrifice.

== Apparitions ==
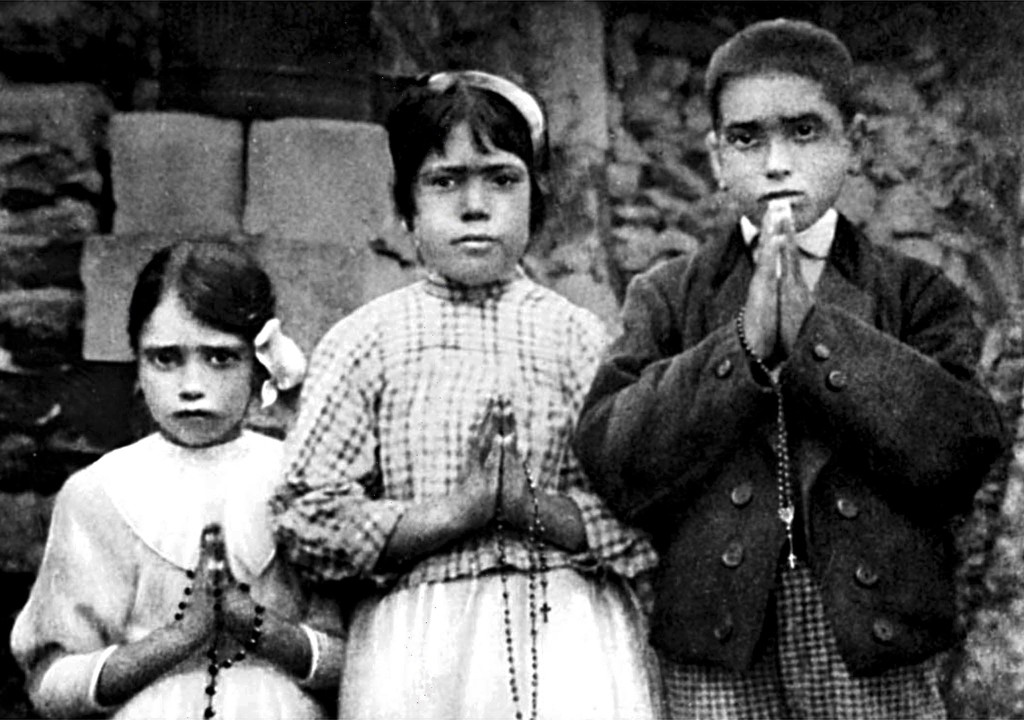
From left to right: Jacinta Marto, Lúcia dos Santos and Francisco Marto, holding their rosaries in 1917

The brother and sister, who tended to their families' sheep with their cousin Lúcia in the fields of Fátima, Portugal, reported seeing several apparitions of an angel in 1916. Lúcia later recorded the words of several prayers she said they learned from this angel.

Sister Lúcia wrote in her memoirs that she and her cousins saw the first apparition of Mary on 13 May 1917. At the time of the apparition, Francisco was 8 years old, and Jacinta was 7.

During the first apparition, the children said Mary asked them to pray the Rosary and to make sacrifices, offering them for the conversion of sinners. She also asked them to return to that spot on the thirteenth of each month for the next six months.

== Illness and death ==
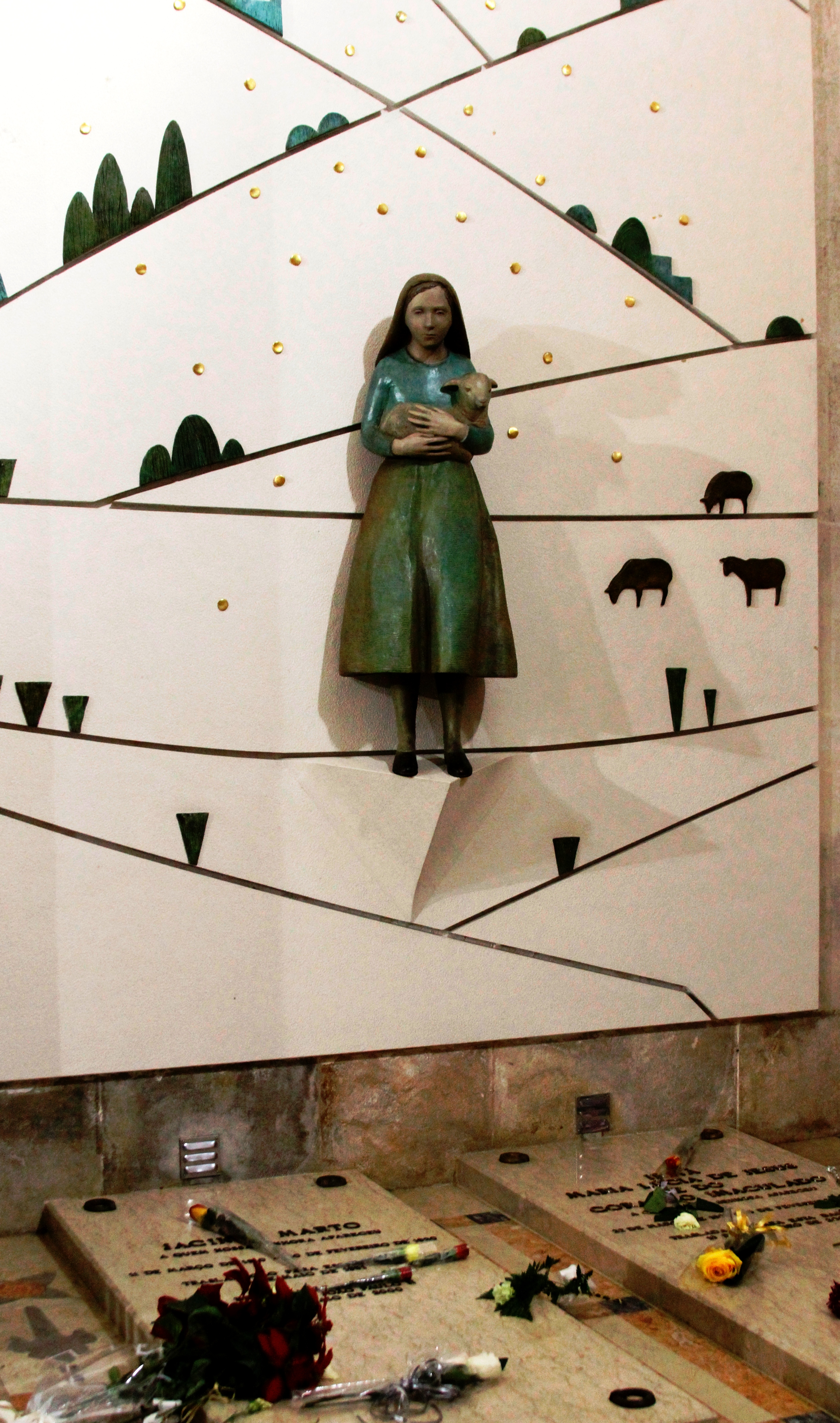
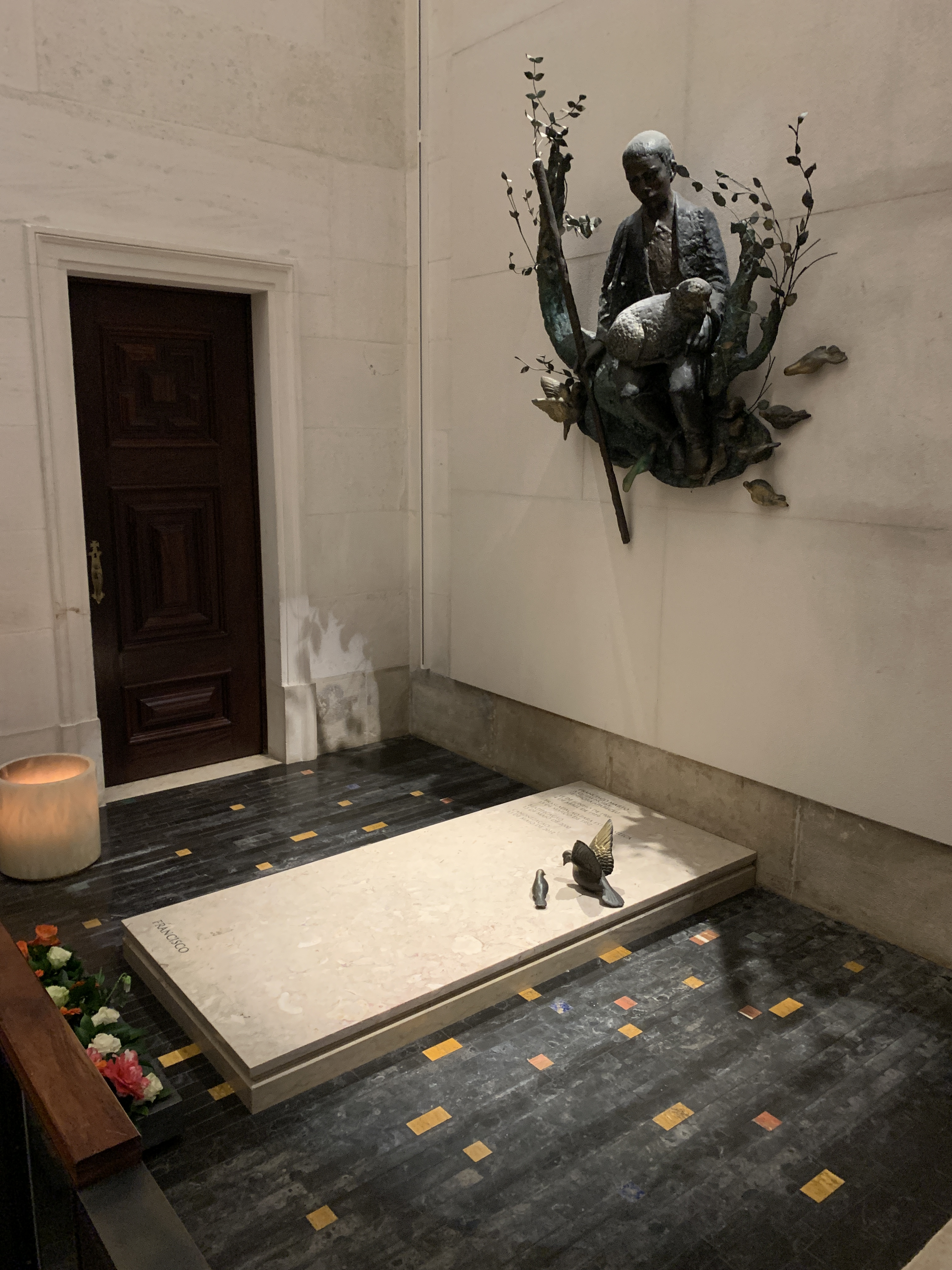
The tombs of Jacinta and Francisco Marto in Fátima, Portugal

The siblings were victims of the great 1918 influenza epidemic that swept through Europe that year. In October 1918, Jacinta told Lúcia that Mary had appeared to her and promised to take them to heaven soon. Both lingered for many months, insisting on walking to church to make Eucharistic devotions and prostrating themselves to pray for hours, kneeling with their heads on the ground as they said the angel had instructed them to do.

Francisco declined hospital treatment on 3 April 1919, and died at home the next day. In an attempt to save her life, which she insisted was futile, Jacinta was moved to Ourém Hospital. Her condition steadily worsened and, in an attempt to transfer her to the children's hospital in Lisbon, Queen Stephanie's Hospital (which at the time only allowed for children from the city to be treated there), she was moved first to the care of the small Orphanage of Our Lady of Miracles, in the Lisbon neighbourhood of Estrela. She developed purulent pleurisy and endured an operation in which two of her ribs were removed. Because of the condition of her heart, she could not be fully anesthetized, and suffered terrible pain, which she said would help to convert many sinners. On 19 February 1920, Jacinta asked the hospital chaplain who heard her confession to bring her Holy Communion and administer Extreme Unction because she was going to die "the next night". He told her that her condition was not that serious and that he would return the next day. The next day Jacinta was dead; she had died, as she had often said she would, alone.

In 1920, shortly before her death at age nine, Jacinta Marto reportedly discussed the Alliance of the Hearts of Jesus and Mary with a then 12-year-old Lúcia dos Santos and said:

When you are to say this, don't go and hide. Tell everybody that God grants us graces through the Immaculate Heart of Mary; that people are to ask her for them; and that the Heart of Jesus wants the Immaculate Heart of Mary to be venerated at his side. Tell them also to pray to the Immaculate Heart of Mary for peace, since God entrusted it to her.

Jacinta and Francisco are both buried at the Basilica of Our Lady of the Rosary of Fátima.

== Beatification and canonization ==
The cause for the siblings' canonization began in 1946. Exhumed in 1935, Jacinta's face was found to be incorrupt; Francisco's had decomposed. By 1951, when she was again exhumed for her reburial in the Basilica, Jacinta had begun to decompose also.

In 1937 Pope Pius XI decided that causes for minors should not be accepted as they could not fully understand heroic virtue or practice it repeatedly, both of which are essential for canonization. In 1979, the bishop of Leiria-Fátima asked all the world's bishops to write to the Pope, petitioning him to make an exception for Francisco, who had died at age 10, and Jacinta, who had died at age 9. More than 300 bishops sent letters to the Pope, writing that "the children were known, admired and attracted people to the way of sanctity. Favors were received through their intercession." The bishops also said that the children's canonization was a pastoral necessity for the children and teenagers of the day.

In 1979, the Congregation for the Causes of Saints convened a general assembly. Cardinals, bishops, theologians and other experts debated whether it was possible for children to display heroic virtue. Eventually, they decided that, like the very few children who have a genius for music or mathematics, "in some supernatural way, some children could be spiritual prodigies." They were declared venerable by Pope John Paul II in 1989.

On 13 May 2000, they were declared "blessed" in a decree from the Congregation for the Causes of Saints.

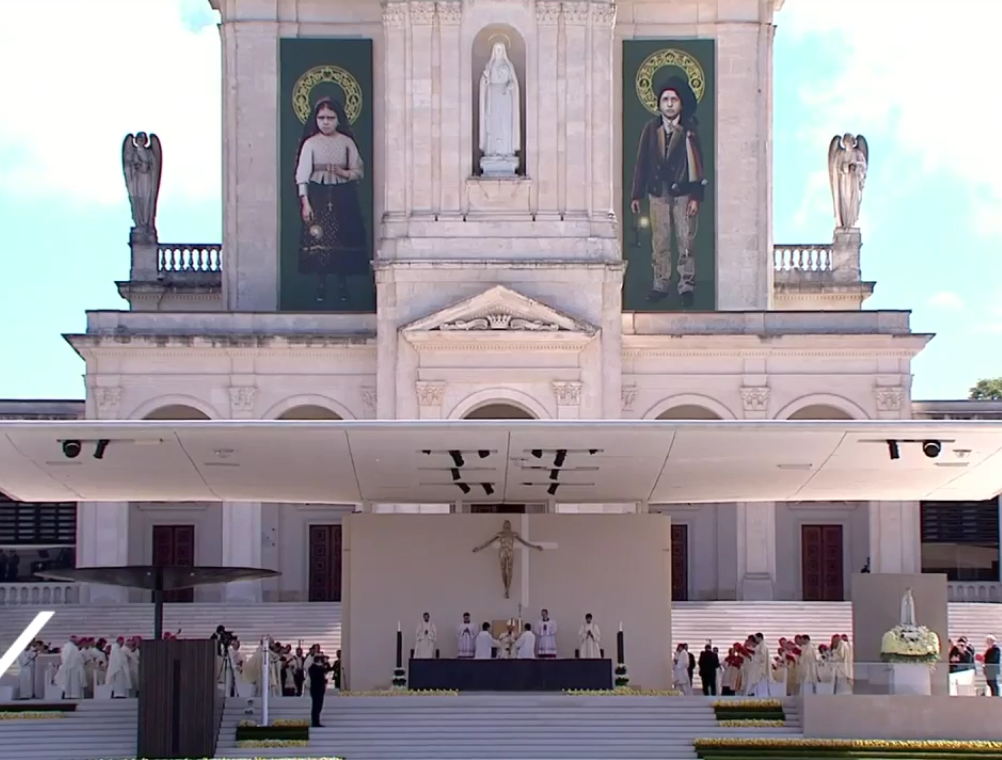
Canonization of Jacinta and Francisco Marto by Pope Francis, at the Sanctuary of Fátima on 13 May 2017

When Pope John Paul II arrived in Fátima for the first time, in 1982, he said that he had come "because, on this exact date last year in St. Peter's Square, in Rome, there was an attempt on the life of your Pope, which mysteriously coincided with the anniversary of the first vision at Fátima, that of 13 May 1917. The coincidence of these dates was so great that it seemed to be a special invitation for me to come here."

Another miracle was found to have been attributed to their intercession and the process that investigated the presumed miracle was validated on 8 February 2013. On 23 March 2017, it was announced that Pope Francis would canonize them while visiting Portugal on 12 and 13 May. The pope solemnly canonized the children on 13 May 2017 during the centennial of the first apparition.

They are the Catholic Church's youngest saints who did not die as martyrs, with Jacinta being the youngest.

== In popular culture ==
Jacinta is played by Sherry Jackson and Francisco is played by Sammy Ogg in the 1952 film The Miracle of Our Lady of Fatima.

In the 2020 film Fatima, Jacinta is played by Alejandra Howard and Francisco is played by Jorge Lamelas.
