= A Pathway Under the Gaze of Mary =

A Pathway Under the Gaze of Mary: Biography of Sister Maria Lucia of Jesus and the Immaculate Heart
- First edition (Portuguese cover)
- Author: Carmelite nuns of Coimbra
- Original title: Um Caminho sob o olhar de Maria: Biografia da Irmã Maria Lúcia de Jesus e do Coração Imaculado
- Translator: James A. Colson
- Language: English
- Genre: Biography
- Publisher: Edições Carmelo, Portugal, World Apostolate of Fátima, USA; First edition (2015)
- Publication place: Portugal
- Pages: 439
- ISBN: 978-0578158631
- Website: www.ignatius.com

A Pathway Under the Gaze of Mary: Biography of Sister Maria Lucia of Jesus and the Immaculate Heart is a 2015 biographical book about Sister Lúcia de Jesús Rosa dos Santos (OCD), the last surviving seer of Our Lady of Fátima apparitions in Cova da Iria, Fátima, Portugal.

Written by the Discalced Carmelites nuns of Coimbra, Portugal, who lived with Sister Lúcia for 57 years, they share their personal knowledge and testimonies of her rich spirituality and depth of soul witnessed in her daily life. Drawing from her Memoirs, correspondence, oral narrations and private writings never before published, Lúcia's story unfolds, providing readers with a fascinating glimpse into the crosses she bore for the salvation of souls, peace in the world, the conversion of atheistic Russia and the spread of devotion to the Immaculate Heart of Mary.

"We invite you to get to know Lúcia, the little shepherd who gave her ‘yes’ to Our Lady at Fátima, on May 13, 1917, and confirmed it every day until her holy death on February 13, 2005. ‘It is all for Our Lady,’ Lúcia stated often throughout her life. We hope this book inspires the faithful to follow Our Lady’s requests at Fátima, to pray the Rosary every day and to offer everything as a sacrifice for the salvation of souls and peace in the world. This simple message is more relevant today than ever." – David Carollo, Executive Director of the Blue Army of Our Lady of Fátima in the United States

Sister Lúcia, the famous little shepherdess of Fátima, chosen to spread the Messages of Our Lady of Fátima and devotion to her Immaculate Heart throughout the world, fulfilled this monumental task largely through humble faithfulness to daily duty, prayer and sacrifice.

Through her simple trust and great love for the "Hidden Jesus" and "the lady brighter than the sun", Sister Lúcia shows us how to live the Message of Fátima, a plan of peace and salvation for the whole world, still relevant today.

"This book will help readers appreciate the distinctive qualities essential to the life of Sister Lucia: love of God, devotion to Our Lady, unconditional fidelity to the Church, and commitment to the salvation of lost humanity." – Most Reverend Virgílio Antunes, Bishop of Coimbra

== Books by Sister Lúcia ==
- Fatima in Lucia's Own Words, 1973
- Fatima in Lucia's Own Words II, 2000
- Calls from the Message of Fatima, 2005
