= Fatima in Lucia's Own Words II =

2000 book by Sister Maria Lúcia of Fátima

- First edition
- Author: Sister Maria Lúcia of Jesus and of the Immaculate Heart
- Original title: Memórias da Irmã Lúcia II
- Translator: Dominican Nuns of the Perpetual Rosary
- Language: English
- Genre: Memoirs
- Publisher: Secretariado dos Pastorinhos, Ravengate Press (2000)
- Publication place: Portugal
- Pages: 197
- ISBN: 978-9728524043
- Preceded by: Fatima in Lucia's Own Words
- Followed by: Calls from the Message of Fatima
- Website: www.lucia.pt

Fatima in Lucia's Own Words II (also known as Sister Lucia's Memoirs II) is a 2000 book by Sister Lúcia of Fátima (OCD) and contains the 5th and 6th memoirs of the last surviving seer of the apparitions of Our Lady of Fátima in 1917. This book is the second of two volumes: the fifth memoir is about her father, while the sixth memoir is about her mother. The book also contains several pictures of her family home, including interior rooms, and pictures of brothers, sisters and parents, and drawings showing the layout of Lúcia's home, and the general layout of the property.

Edited by Father Louis Kondor, SVD, this book was translated into the English language by the Dominican Nuns of the Perpetual Rosary and published by the Portuguese Postulation for the Three Little Shepherds of Fátima (Secretariado dos Pastorinhos).

== See also ==
- Fatima in Lucia's Own Words, volume 1 of the memoirs, 1976
- Calls from the Message of Fatima, 2005 book by Sister Lucia
- A Pathway Under the Gaze of Mary: Biography of Sister Maria Lucia of Jesus and the Immaculate Heart
