= Calls from the Message of Fatima =

2000 book by Sister Lúcia de Jesus Rosa dos Santos

- First edition
- Author: Sister Lúcia of Jesus de las Rosas
- Original title: Apelos da Mensagem de Fátima
- Translator: Dominican Nuns of the Perpetual Rosary
- Language: English
- Genre: Christian devotional literature
- Publisher: Secretariado dos Pastorinhos (13 December 2000), Ravengate Press (18 June 2005)
- Publication place: Portugal
- Pages: 297
- ISBN: 978-9728524234
- Preceded by: Fatima in Lucia's Own Words II
- Website: www.lucia.pt

Calls from the Message of Fatima, also known as Appeals from the Message of Fatima, is a 2000 book written by Sister Lúcia de Jesus Rosa dos Santos (OCD), the last surviving seer of the apparitions of Our Lady of Fátima in 1917.

Finding herself inundated with constantly repeated questions concerning the Marian apparitions that occurred in Fátima, Portugal, and the visionaries, the message they received and the reason for some of the requests contained in that message, and feeling that it was beyond her to reply individually to each questioner, Sister Lúcia asked the Holy See for permission to write a text in which she could reply in general to the many questions that had been put to her. This permission was granted, hence the present work titled in English language: "Calls" or "Appeals" from the Message of Fatima.

This book is, in effect, a long letter, written entirely by Sister Lúcia and addressed by her to all those who have written to her concerning their doubts, questions, and difficulties, and their desire for greater fidelity in living up to what was asked for from Heaven in the Cova da Iria.

== See also ==
- Fatima in Lucia's Own Words, 1973 book
- Fatima in Lucia's Own Words II, 2000 book
- A Pathway Under the Gaze of Mary: Biography of Sister Maria Lucia of Jesus and the Immaculate Heart, 2015 biography
