= Fatima in Lucia's Own Words =

1976 book

- First edition (Portuguese)
- Author: Sister Maria Lúcia of Jesus and of the Immaculate Heart
- Original title: Memórias da Irmã Lúcia
- Translator: Dominican Nuns of the Perpetual Rosary
- Language: English
- Genre: Memoirs
- Publisher: Secretariado dos Pastorinhos (1976), Ravengate Press (1978)
- Publication place: Portugal
- Pages: 240
- ISBN: 978-9728524203
- Followed by: Fatima in Lucia's Own Words II
- Website: www.lucia.pt

Fatima in Lucia's Own Words (Portuguese: Memórias da Irmã Lúcia, also known as Sister Lucia's Memoirs) is a 1976 collection of memoirs and letters written by Sister Lúcia de Jesus Rosa dos Santos (OCD), the last surviving seer of the apparitions Our Lady of Fátima in 1917. This book, the first of two volumes, describes the life of Sister Lúcia, as well as the characters, lives and deaths of the other two children, Francisco and Jacinta Marto. It includes the visions of the three little shepherds of Fátima, which included Hell, War, the Holy Father, the Three Secrets, the Angel of Peace, and the Marian apparitions themselves. Photos include the uncorrupted body of Saint Jacinta Marto.

Edited by Louis Kondor, this book was originally introduced by Joaquin M. Alonso, and was translated into English by the Dominican Nuns of the Perpetual Rosary and published by the Portuguese Postulation for the Three Little Shepherds of Fátima (Secretariado dos Pastorinhos).

== See also ==
- Fatima in Lucia's Own Words II, 2000 book
- Calls from the Message of Fatima, 2005 book
- A Pathway Under the Gaze of Mary: Biography of Sister Maria Lucia of Jesus and the Immaculate Heart, 2015 biography
