= Manuel Nunes Formigão =

Portuguese Catholic priest

The Venerable Manuel Nunes Formigão
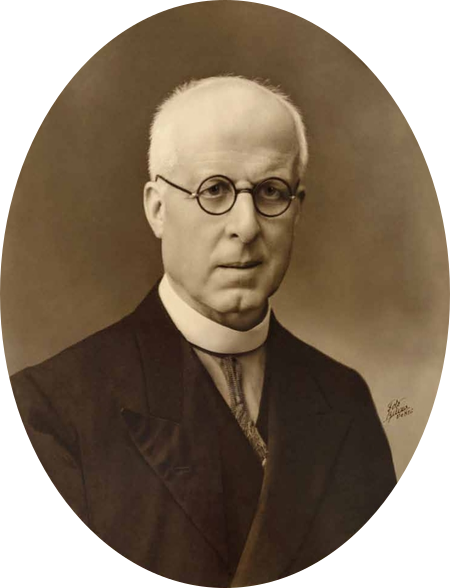
- Church: Roman Catholic
- Diocese: Leiria

Orders
- Ordination: 4 April 1908

Personal details
- Born: 1 January 1883 Convent of Christ, Tomar, Portugal
- Died: 30 January 1958 (aged 75) Fátima, Ourém, Portugal
- Buried: Casa de Nossa Senhora das Dores, Fátima

Manuel Nunes Formigão Júnior (Portuguese: [mɐˈnwɛl ˈnunɨʃ fuɾˈmi.ɣɐ̃w̃]; 1 January 1883 – 30 January 1958) was a Portuguese Catholic priest. Formigão was one of the first people to look into the phenomenon of the apparitions of Our Lady of Fátima, having been the clergyman sent by the Diocese of Leiria in 1917 to question the three little shepherd children Lúcia dos Santos and Francisco and Jacinta Marto to ascertain the veracity of the apparitions. He later became the founder of the Congregation of the Sisters of Reparation of Our Lady of Fatima, in 1927.

Formigão was the first promoter and the most prolific early writer on the Fátima apparitions, and dedicated himself to the construction of its theological and ideological interpretation, which the senior hierarchy of the Catholic Church officially acknowledged and disseminated from 1930. Ernesto Sena de Oliveira, Archbishop-Bishop of Coimbra, considered Formigão the "most fitting, most efficient and most decisive instrument of divine providence to bring into high relief the events at Cova da Iria"; Manuel Gonçalves Cerejeira, Cardinal-Patriarch of Lisbon, described him as "the great apostle of Fátima".

The cause for his canonization was officially opened in 2000. He is venerated in the Catholic Church, having been officially recognised as having lived a life of heroic virtue by Pope Francis in 2018 and he is now referred to as "Venerable".

On 28 January 2017, Formigão's remains were reinterred, from the Fátima local cemetery, in a mausoleum in Casa de Nossa Senhora das Dores (of the Congregation of the Sisters of Reparation); a Requiem Mass was celebrated in the Basilica of the Holy Trinity for the occasion, presided by the Bishop of Leiria-Fátima, António Marto.

== "Miracle of the Sun" witness ==
On 13 October 1917 Formigão witnessed the Miracle of the Sun and described it "As if like a bolt from the blue, the clouds were wrenched apart, and the sun at its zenith appeared in all its splendor. It began to revolve vertiginously on its axis, like the most magnificent firewheel that could be imagined, taking on all the colors of the rainbow and sending forth multicolored flashes of light, producing the most astounding effect. This sublime and incomparable spectacle, which was repeated three distinct times, lasted for about ten minutes. The immense multitude, overcome by the evidence of such a tremendous prodigy, threw themselves on their knees."

== Writings ==
Formigão wrote numerous books, including some on his experiences at Fátima.
