= Archdiocesan Marian Shrine =

Shrine dedicated to the Virgin Mary in Milwaukee, Wisconsin, United States

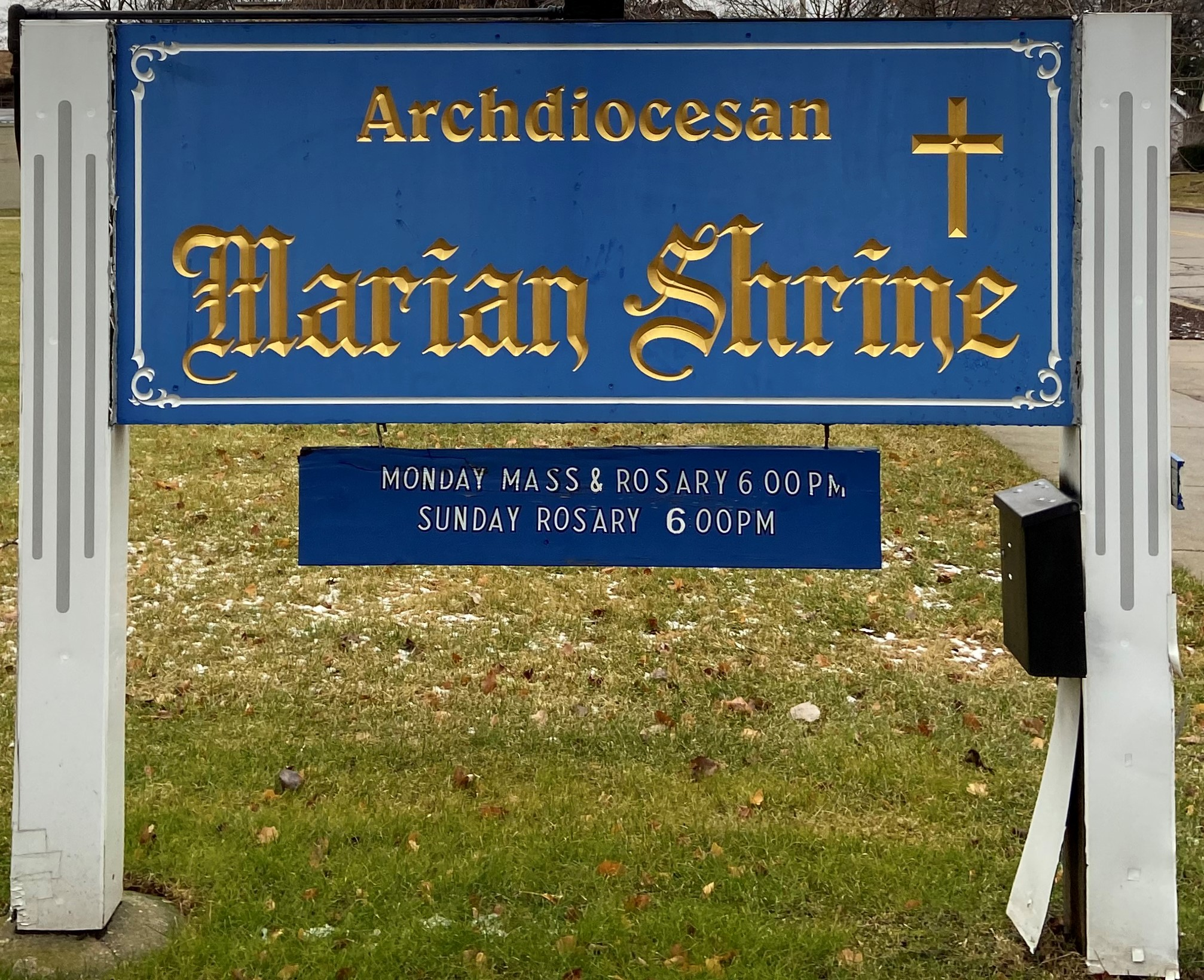
- Interactive map of Archdiocesan Marian Shrine
- Location: Milwaukee, Wisconsin
- Coordinates: 43.032892°N 87.997609°W
- Material: Carrara marble, lannon stone, concrete
- Dedicated to: Blessed Virgin Mary
- Website: http://www.marianshrinemilwaukee.org/

The Archdiocesan Marian Shrine, formerly known as the Milwaukee Fatima Shrine and the National Shrine to Our Lady of Fatima, is of the Roman Catholic Church and a shrine to the Virgin Mary. It is operated by the Roman Catholic Archdiocese of Milwaukee, which acquired the property from the Dominican Sisters of the Perpetual Rosary. It is located in Milwaukee, Wisconsin. The shrine was dedicated on April 26, 1948. The shrine also has a small indoor chapel and stone representations of the 15 mysteries of the rosary.

== History ==
The shrine began as a prayer for peace by the cloistered Dominican Sisters of the Perpetual Rosary. It is a Carrera marble statue of the Virgin Mary and statues of the three children and sheep. In May 1945, it was thought to be the first and only shrine to Our Lady of Fatima in the United States. The Dominican Sisters hoped it would be made a national shrine.

== Additions to the shrine ==
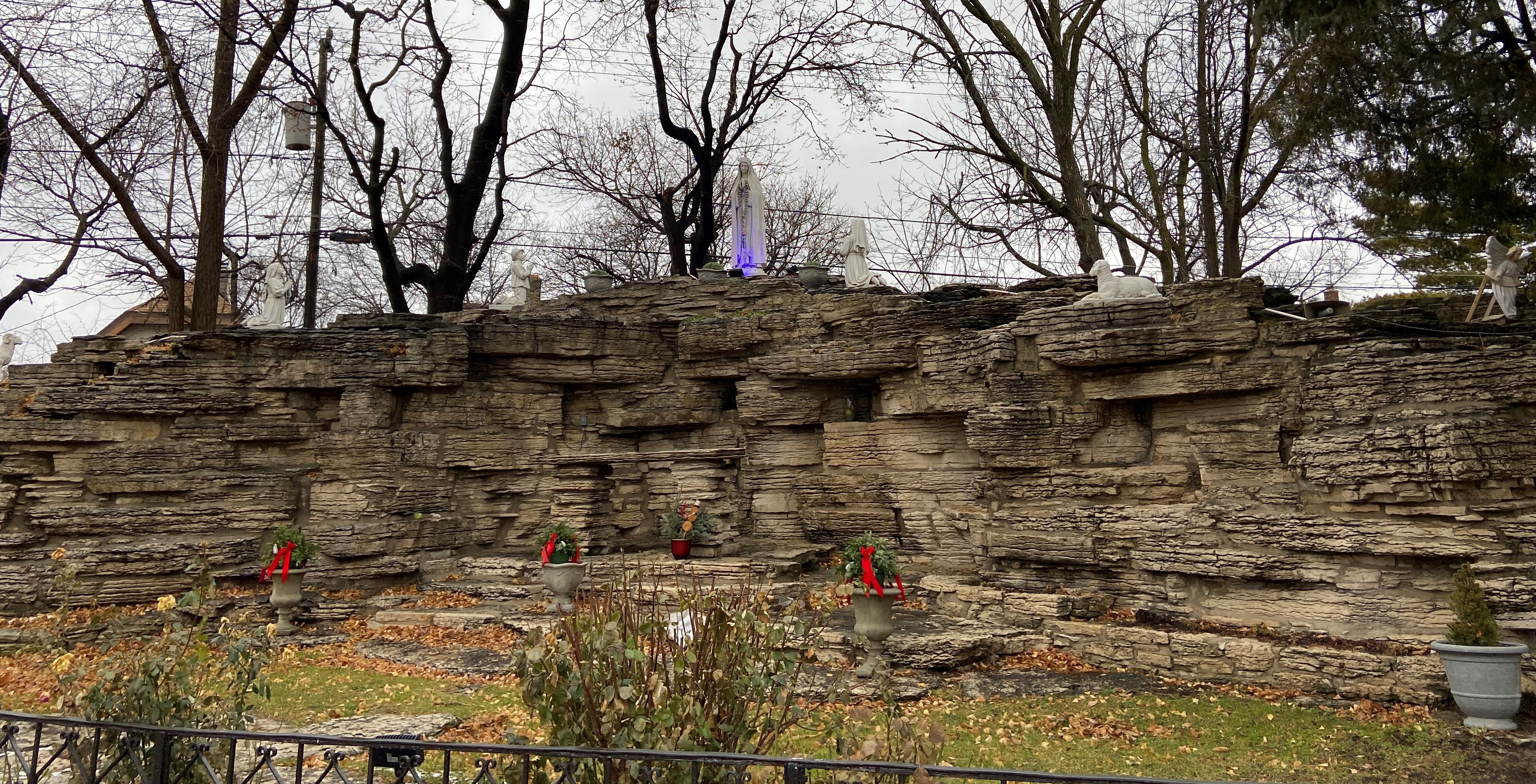
Archdiocesan Marian Shrine

A marble figure of Christ erected on a cross was added in 1952. It was donated by a woman who wished to remain anonymous.

In 1967, a brewery worker contributed a marble statue of St. Joseph and his son. The brewery worker felt the shrine was incomplete without a statue of the father of Christ. It is also in memory of the accidental death of Frederick C. Miller and his 20-year-old son, Fred Jr. The statue bears a part of Miller's favorite prayer.
