= Our Lady of Fátima =

Title for Mary, mother of Jesus

Our Lady of Fátima Our Lady of the Holy Rosary of Fátima
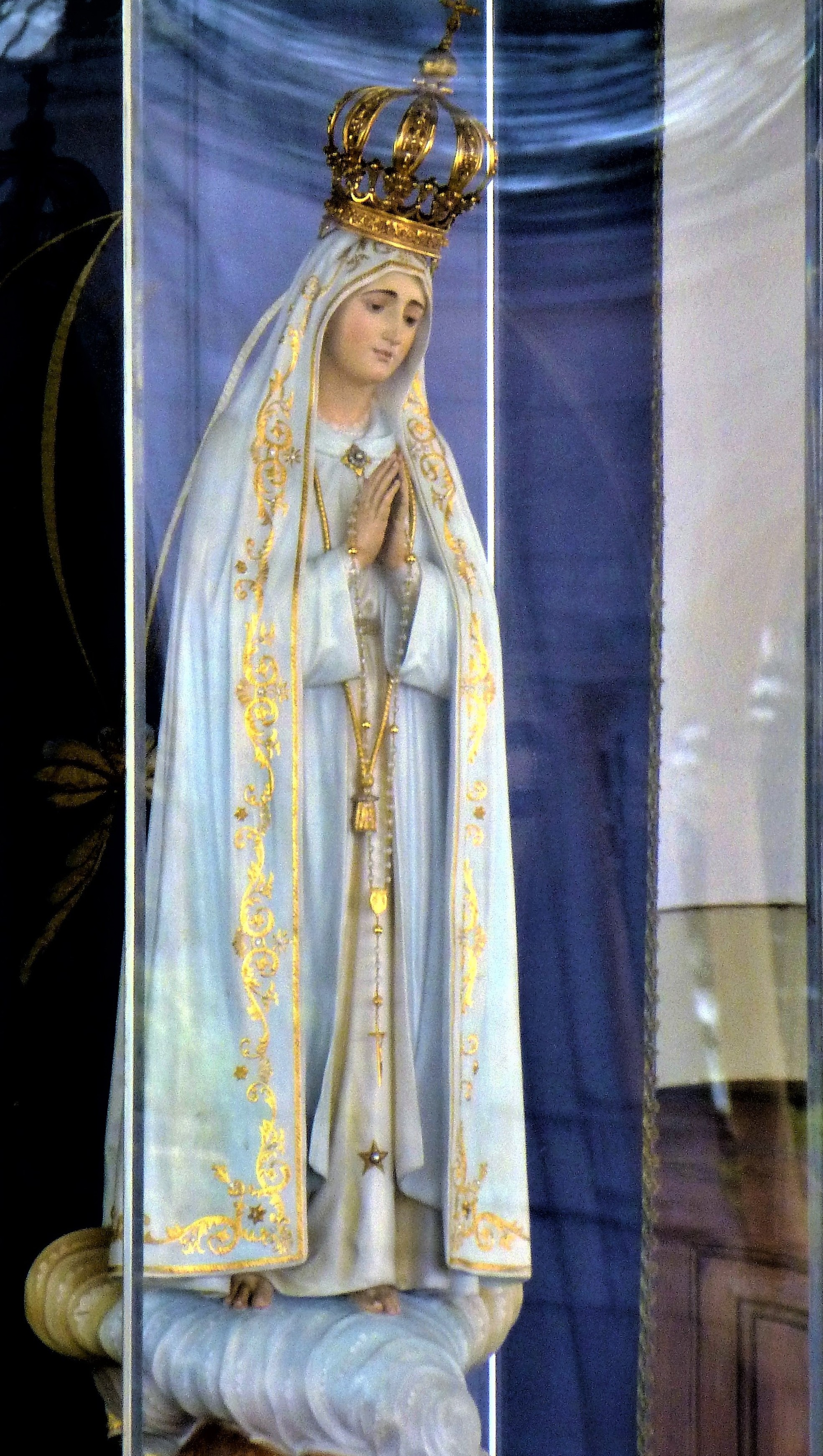
- The canonically crowned image enshrined within the Chapel of the Apparitions
- Location: Fátima, Portugal
- Date: 13 May to 13 October 1917
- Witness: Lúcia dos Santos; Francisco and Jacinta Marto
- Type: Marian apparition
- Approval: 13 October 1930: José Alves Correia da Silva, Bishop of Leiria; 25 April 1946: Pontifical decree of coronation by Pope Pius XII
- Venerated in: Catholic Church; Anglo-Catholicism
- Shrine: Sanctuary of Our Lady of Fátima, Cova da Iria, Fátima, Portugal
- Patronage: Diocese of Leiria-Fátima; East Timor; Guyana; Suriname; Valenzuela City
- Feast day: 13 May

Our Lady of Fátima (Portuguese: Nossa Senhora de Fátima, pronounced [ˈnɔsɐ sɨˈɲɔɾɐ ðɨ ˈfatimɐ]; formally known as Our Lady of the Holy Rosary of Fátima) is a Catholic title of Mary, mother of Jesus, based on the Marian apparitions reported in 1917 by three shepherd children at the Cova da Iria in Fátima, Portugal. The three children were Lúcia dos Santos and her cousins Francisco and Jacinta Marto. José Alves Correia da Silva, Bishop of Leiria, declared the events worthy of belief on 13 October 1930.

Pope Pius XII granted a pontifical decree of canonical coronation via the papal bull Celeberrima solemnia towards the venerated image on 25 April 1946. The designated papal legate, Cardinal Benedetto Aloisi Masella, carried out the coronation on 13 May 1946, now permanently enshrined at the Chapel of the Apparitions of Fátima. The same Roman Pontiff also raised the Sanctuary of Fátima to the status of a minor basilica by the apostolic letter Luce superna on 11 November 1954.

The published memoirs of Sister Lúcia in the 1930s revealed two secrets that she claimed came from the Virgin Mary, while the third secret was to be revealed by the Catholic Church in 1960. The controversial events at Fátima, including the Miracle of the Sun, gained fame due partly to elements of the secrets, prophecy and eschatological revelations allegedly related to the Second World War and possibly more global wars in the future, particularly the Virgin's request for the Consecration of Russia to the Immaculate Heart of Mary.

== History ==
=== Marian apparitions ===
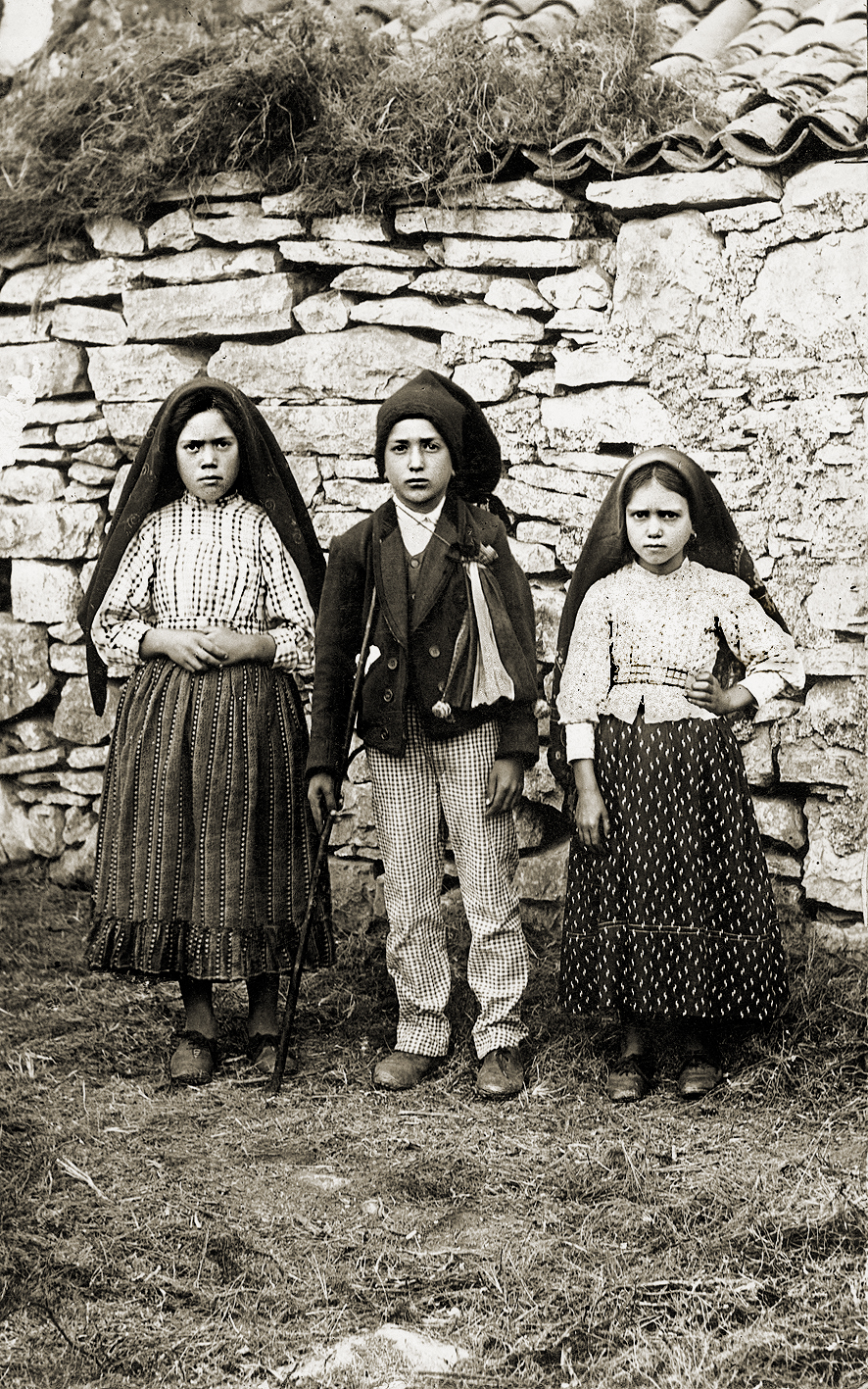
Lúcia dos Santos (left) with her cousins, Francisco and Jacinta Marto, 1917

Beginning in the spring of 1916, three shepherd children – Lúcia dos Santos, Francisco and Jacinta Marto – reported three apparitions of an Angel in Valinhos. Then, starting on 13 May 1917, in Cova da Iria, six apparitions of the Blessed Virgin Mary were reported. The children described her as "a Lady more brilliant than the Sun". The children reported a prophecy that prayer would lead to an end to the Great War, and that on 13 October that year the Lady would reveal her identity and perform a miracle "so that all may believe." Newspapers reported the prophecies, and many pilgrims began visiting the area. The children's accounts were deeply controversial, drawing intense criticism from both local secular and religious authorities. A provincial administrator briefly took the children into custody, believing the prophecies were politically motivated in opposition to the officially secular First Portuguese Republic established in 1910.

On 13 May 1917, the shepherd children reported seeing a woman "brighter than the sun, shedding rays of light clearer and stronger than a crystal goblet filled with the most sparkling water and pierced by the burning rays of the sun." The woman wore a white mantle edged with gold and held a rosary in her hand. She asked them to devote themselves to the Holy Trinity and to pray "the Rosary every day, to bring peace to the world and an end to the war". While the children had never told anyone about seeing the angel, Jacinta told her family about seeing the brightly lit woman. Lúcia had earlier said that the three should keep this experience private. Jacinta's disbelieving mother told neighbors about it as a joke, and within a day the whole village knew of the children's vision.

The children said the woman told them to return to the Cova da Iria on 13 June 1917. Lúcia's mother sought counsel from the parish priest, Father Manuel Ferreira, who suggested she allow them to go. He asked to have Lúcia brought to him afterward so that he could question her. The second appearance occurred on 13 June, the feast of Saint Anthony, patron of the local parish church. Lúcia would later report that on this occasion, the lady revealed that Francisco and Jacinta would be taken to Heaven soon, but Lúcia would live longer in order to spread her message and devotion to the Immaculate Heart of Mary.

During the June visit, the children said the Lady told them to say the Holy Rosary daily in honor of Our Lady of the Rosary to obtain peace and the end of the Great War. (Three weeks earlier, on 21 April, the first contingent of Portuguese soldiers had embarked for the front lines of the war.) The lady also purportedly revealed to the children a vision of hell, and entrusted a secret to them, described as "good for some and bad for others". Fr. Ferreira later stated that Lúcia recounted that the lady told her, "I want you to come back on the thirteenth and to learn to read in order to understand what I want of you. ...I don't want more."

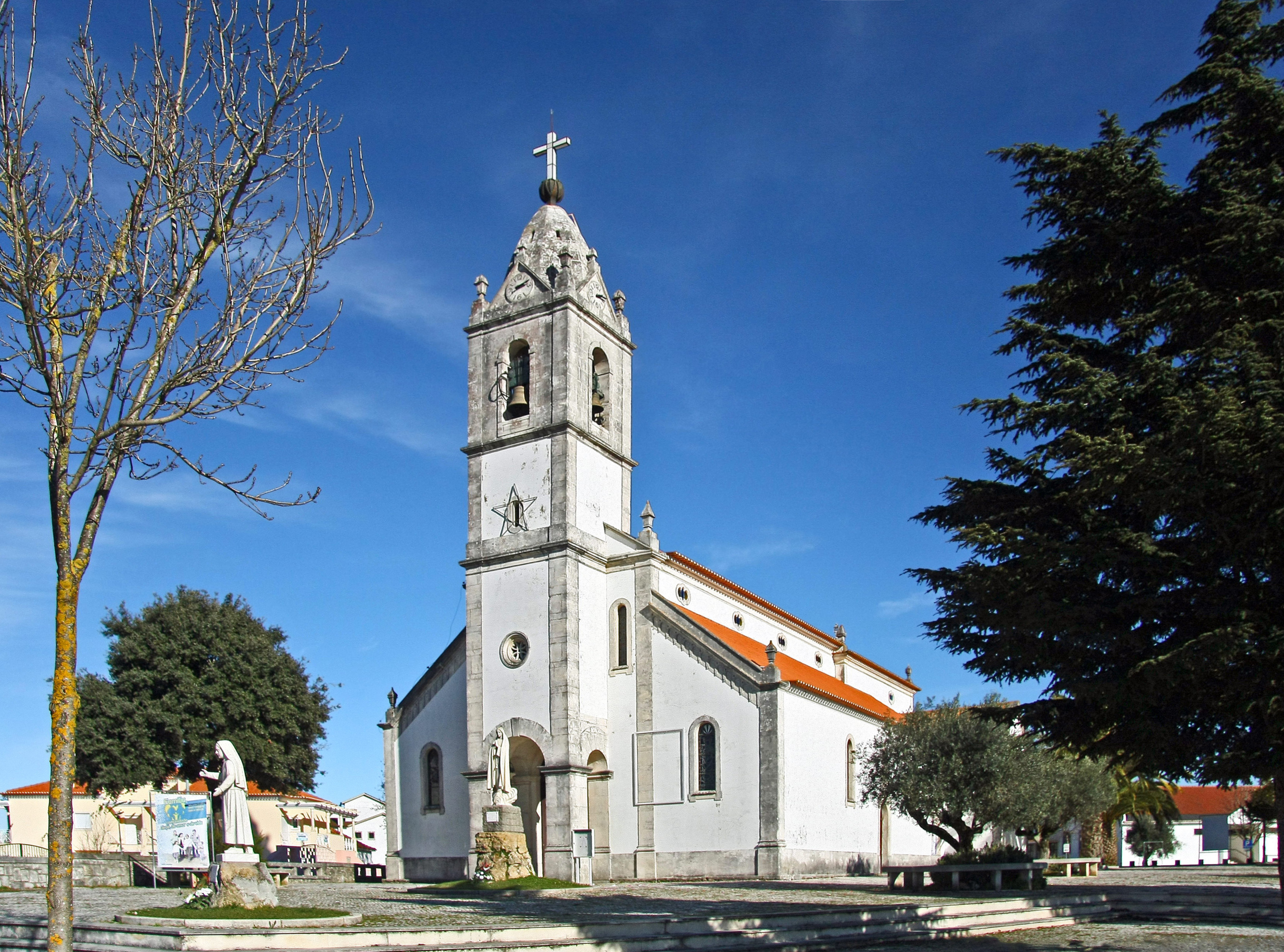
The Parish Church of Fátima where the three shepherd children who saw the apparition were baptized

In the following months, thousands of people flocked to Fátima and nearby Aljustrel, drawn by reports of visions and miracles. On 13 August 1917, the provincial administrator Artur Santos (no relation to Lúcia dos Santos) intervened. He believed that these events were politically disruptive in the conservative country. He took the children into custody, jailing them before they could reach the Cova da Iria. Santos interrogated and threatened the children to get them to divulge the contents of the secrets. Lúcia's mother hoped the officials could persuade the children to end the affair and admit that they had lied. Lúcia told Santos everything short of the secrets and offered to ask the woman for permission to tell the official the secrets.

That month, instead of the usual apparition in the Cova da Iria on 13 August, the children reported that they saw Mary on 19 August, a Sunday, at nearby Valinhos. She asked them again to pray the rosary daily, spoke about the miracle coming in October, and asked them "to pray a lot, a lot for the sinners and sacrifice a lot [Mortification in Catholic theology], as many souls perish in hell because nobody is praying or [Acts of Reparation] making sacrifices for them."

The three children claimed to have seen Mary in a total of six apparitions between 13 May and 13 October 1917. Lúcia also reported a seventh Marian apparition at Cova da Iria. The year 2017 marked the 100th anniversary of the apparitions, and it was celebrated with the visit of Pope Francis to the Sanctuary of Fátima.

==== Messages ====
The words allegedly spoken by the Mary to the three children include:

===== 13 May 1917 =====
Do not be afraid. I will do you no harm. I am from Heaven. I came to ask you to come here on the thirteenth day for six months at this same time, and then I will tell you who I am and what I want. And afterwards, I will return here a seventh time. Yes, you [Lúcia] will [go to heaven]. She [Jacinta] also [will go to heaven]. Yes [Francisco will go to heaven], but first he must say many rosaries. Would you like to offer yourselves to God to accept all the sufferings which He may send to you in reparation for the countless sins by which He is offended and in supplication for the conversion of sinners? Then you will have much to suffer, but the grace of God will be your comfort.

===== 13 June 1917 =====
I want you to come on the thirteenth day of next month and to pray the Rosary every day and I want you to learn to read. If she [sick woman] is converted, she will be cured within a year. Yes, I will take Francisco and Jacinta soon [to heaven], but you must remain on earth for some time. Jesus wishes to use you to make me better known and loved. He wishes to establish in the world devotion to my Immaculate Heart. No, my child [you will not be alone], and would that make you suffer? Do not be disheartened. My Immaculate Heart will never abandon you, but will be your refuge and the way that will lead you to God.

===== 13 July 1917 =====
I want you to come on the thirteenth day of next month and to continue to pray the Rosary every day in honor of Our Lady of the Rosary, in order to obtain peace for the world and the end of the war for she alone can help. Continue to come here every month. In October I will tell you who I am and what I want. And I will perform a miracle so that everyone may see and believe. Sacrifice yourselves for sinners and say often, especially when you make some sacrifice, 'O my Jesus, this is for love of You, for the conversion of sinners, and in reparation for the offenses committed against the Immaculate Heart of Mary.' [A vision of hell] You saw Hell where the souls of poor sinners go. In order to save them, God wishes to establish in the world devotion to my Immaculate Heart. If people do what I ask, many souls will be saved and there will be peace. The war is going to end. But if people do not stop offending God, another, even worse one will begin in the reign of Pius XI. When you shall see a night illuminated by an unknown light know that this is the great sign that God gives you that He is going to punish the world for its many crimes by means of war, hunger, and persecution of the Church and the Holy Father. To prevent it, I shall come to ask for the consecration of Russia to my Immaculate Heart and the Communion of reparation on the first Saturdays. If people attend to my requests, Russia will be converted and the world will have peace. If not, she [Russia] will scatter her errors throughout the world, provoking wars and persecutions of the Church. The good will be martyred, the Holy Father will have much to suffer, and various nations will be destroyed. In the end my Immaculate Heart will triumph. The Holy Father will consecrate Russia to me; it will be converted, and a certain period of peace will be granted to the world. In Portugal the dogmas of the Faith will always be kept. [A vision of the Pope suffering and being martyred] Do not tell this to anyone. Francisco ... yes, you may tell him" [Lúcia and Jacinta both saw and heard Our Lady but Francisco only saw the apparitions]. When you say the Rosary, say after each mystery: O my Jesus, forgive us our sins, save us from the fires of Hell and lead all souls to Heaven, especially those most in need.

===== 19 August 1917 =====
Pray, pray a great deal and make many sacrifices, for many souls go to Hell because they have no one to make sacrifices and to pray for them. St. Joseph too will come with the Holy Child to bring peace to the world. Our Lord will also come to bless the people. Our Lady of the Rosary and Our Lady of Sorrows will come too.

===== 13 September 1917 =====
You must pray! Continue to pray the Rosary every day in order to obtain the end of the war. In October Our Lord will come, and Our Lady of Sorrows and of Mount Carmel and St. Joseph with the Child Jesus to bless the world. God is pleased with your sacrifices, but He does not want you to sleep with the rope on; wear it only during the day. [Regarding miraculous cures] Some I will cure, others not. In October I shall perform a miracle so that everyone may believe.

===== 13 October 1917 =====
I am the Lady of the Rosary, I have come to warn the faithful to amend their lives and ask for pardon for their sins. They must not offend our Lord any more, for He is already too grievously offended by the sins of men. People must say the rosary. Let them continue saying it every day. I would like a chapel built here in my honor. The war will end soon.

=== Miracle of the Sun ===
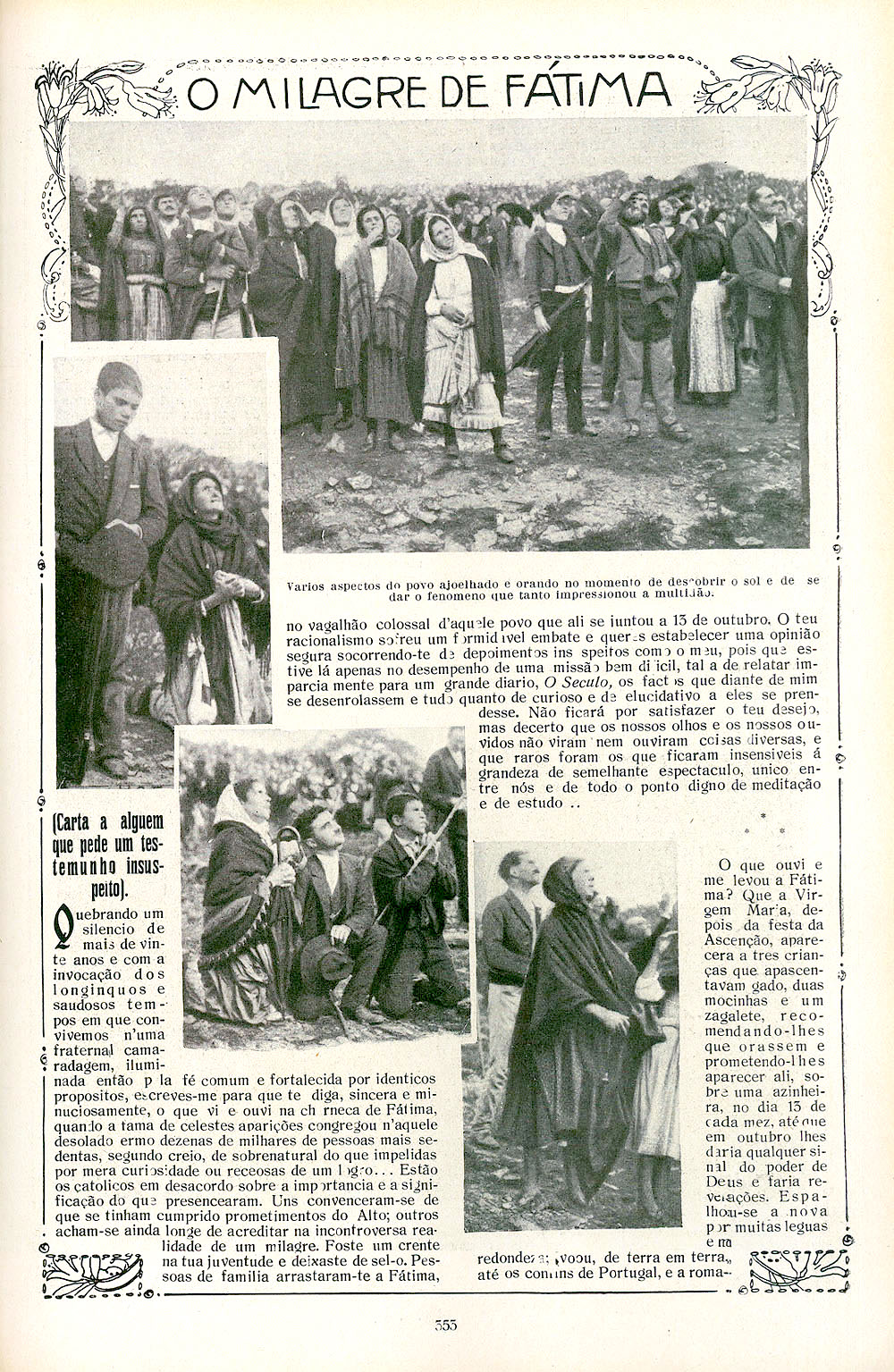
Page from Ilustração Portuguesa, 29 October 1917, showing the people looking at the Sun during the Fátima apparitions attributed to the Virgin Mary

After some newspapers reported that the Virgin Mary had promised a miracle for the last of her apparitions on 13 October, a huge crowd, possibly between 30,000 and 100,000, including reporters and photographers, gathered at Cova da Iria. What happened then became known as the "Miracle of the Sun".

Various claims have been made as to what actually happened during the event. The three children who originally claimed to have seen Our Lady of Fátima reported seeing a panorama of visions during the event, including those of Jesus, Our Lady of Sorrows, Our Lady of Mount Carmel, and of Saint Joseph blessing the people. Father John De Marchi, an Italian Catholic priest and researcher, wrote several books on the subject, which included descriptions by witnesses who believed they had seen a miracle created by Mary. According to accounts, after a period of rain, the dark clouds broke, and the Sun appeared as an opaque, spinning disc in the sky. It was said to be significantly duller than normal and to cast multicolored lights across the landscape, the people, and the surrounding clouds. The Sun was then reported to have careened towards the Earth before zig-zagging back to its normal position. Witnesses reported that their previously wet clothes became "suddenly and completely dry, as well as the wet and muddy ground that had been previously soaked because of the rain that had been falling".

Not all witnesses reported seeing the Sun "dance". Some people only saw the radiant colors, and others, including some believers, saw nothing at all. No unusual phenomenon of the Sun was observed by scientists at the time. Skeptics have offered alternative explanations that include psychological suggestibility of the witnesses, temporary retinal distortion caused by staring at the intense light of the Sun, and optical effects caused by natural meteorological phenomena.

In De Marchi's account, he describes Manuel Nunes Formigão, the priest who interviewed the children during the apparitions, as alarmed by a discrepancy between a prophecy the children reported and the current circumstances. According to the children, their apparition predicted that the First World War would end on 13 October 1917. "But listen Lúcia," De Marchi reports Formigão saying, "The war is still going on. The papers give news of battles after the 13th. How can you explain that if our Lady said the war would end that day?" Lúcia replied, "I don't know; I only know that I heard her say that the war would end on that day [...] I said exactly what our Lady had said." Jacinta, the youngest child, was interrogated separately and said the same: "She [Mary] said that we were to say the Rosary every day and that the war would end today." World War I ended a little over a year later on Armistice Day, 11 November 1918.

De Marchi documented that in the two years before the deaths of Francisco and Jacinta Marto in the 1918 Spanish flu pandemic, the three children periodically refused food and water, or else drank dirty water such as from a laundry pond, as a penance; De Marchi noted that Jacinta's mother had forbidden drinking from the pond due to the risk of illness. De Marchi wrote, "In the scorching sun of the serra, when through the bright hours of the day the heat hangs like a hot stove everywhere, they abstained from taking any water through one spell of thirty days, and at another time for nine." and described Jacinta as being hospitalized for severe bronchial illness, after which she confided to her older cousin that she was still abstaining: "I was thirsty, Lúcia, and I didn't drink, and so I offered it to Jesus for sinners." Lúcia wrote in her 1936 and 1941 memoirs that the Virgin Mary predicted the deaths of Francisco and Jacinta during the second apparition on 13 June 1917.

In one of several memoirs, Lúcia wrote that the children tied "penitence cords" so tightly around their waists that the ropes became blood-stained, and that the apparition of 13 September 1917, told her, "God is pleased with your sacrifices, but He does not want you to sleep with the rope on; only wear it during the day." Late in life, Lúcia also wrote about doubts she expressed as a child regarding the authenticity of the apparition. She wrote, "I began then to have doubts as to whether these manifestations might be from the devil [...] truly, ever since I had started seeing these things, our home was no longer the same, for joy and peace had fled. What anguish I felt!" She also describes a vivid nightmare she experienced during this time period wherein "the devil was laughing at having deceived me." De Marchi states that Lúcia told her cousin prior to traveling to Cova da Iria in anticipation of the 13 July 1917 apparition, "If she [the Lady] asks for me, Jacinta, you tell her why I'm not there. Because I am afraid it is the Devil who sends her to us!" Lúcia wrote in her memoir that on the following day, she was overtaken by a certainty that she should go, despite her earlier dread: "...when it was nearly time to leave, I suddenly felt I had to go, impelled by a strange force that I could hardly resist." According to De Marchi, "Lúcia's doubts were mercifully dissolved".

== Later years of the children ==
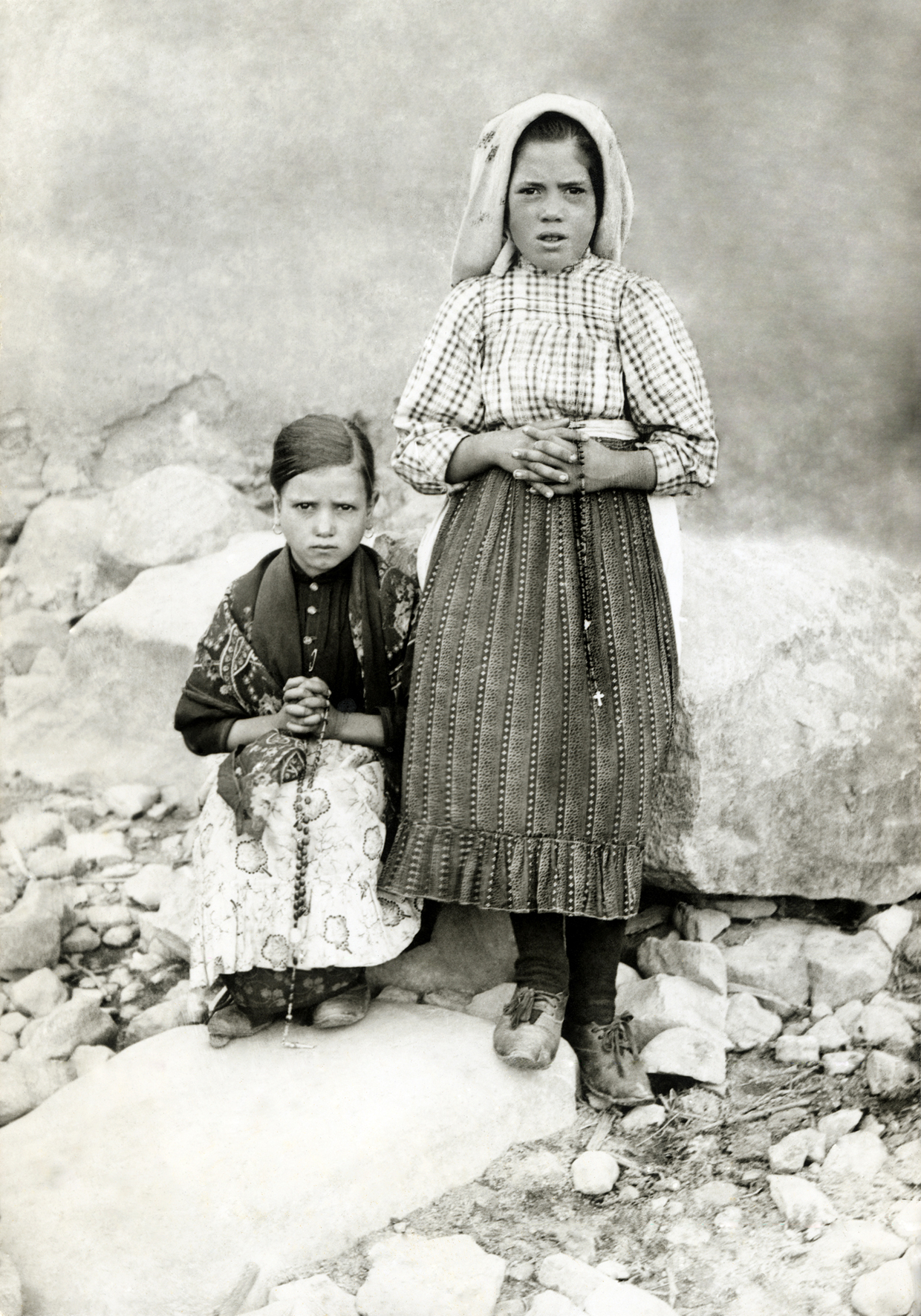
Lúcia dos Santos (standing) with her cousin, Jacinta Marto, 1917

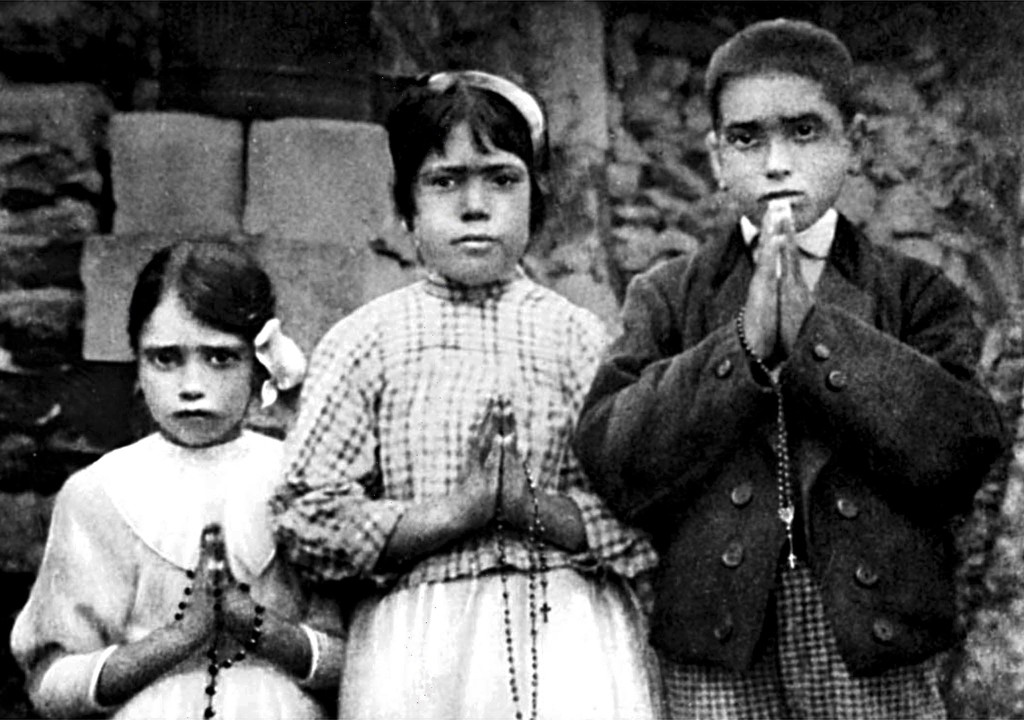
From left to right: Jacinta Marto, Lúcia dos Santos and Francisco Marto, holding their rosaries in 1917

Francisco and Jacinta Marto died in the global flu pandemic that began in 1918 and swept the world for two years. Francisco Marto died at home on 4 April 1919, at the age of ten. Jacinta died at the age of nine in Queen Stephanie's Children's Hospital in Lisbon on 20 February 1920. Their mother Olímpia Marto said that her children had predicted their deaths many times to her and to curious pilgrims in the brief period after the Marian apparitions. They are now buried at the Sanctuary of Fátima. They were beatified by Pope John Paul II on 13 May 2000 and canonized by Pope Francis on 13 May 2017.

On 17 June 1921, at the age of fourteen, Lúcia was admitted as a boarder at the Sisters of Saint Dorothy (Dorothean) school in Vilar, a suburb of Porto, Portugal. In 1925, at the age of eighteen, she began her novitiate at the convent of the Sisters of Saint Dorothy in Tui, Spain, near the border with Portugal. Lúcia continued to report in her memoir private visions periodically throughout her life.

On 10 December 1925, she reported a vision of the Virgin Mary, accompanied by the Child Jesus on a luminous cloud, while residing at the convent in Pontevedra, Spain. The Virgin Mary defined the conditions for the First Saturdays devotion and asked her to propagate the devotion. Later, on 15 February 1926, she reported a subsequent vision of the Christ Child reiterating this request. On 13 June 1929, Lúcia reported a vision of the Holy Trinity and the Virgin Mary, who repeated her request for the Consecration of Russia to her Immaculate Heart. She also reported a 1931 apparition in Rianxo, Galicia, in which she said Jesus visited her, taught her two prayers, and gave a message addressed to the Catholic Church's hierarchy.

In 1936 and again in 1941, Sister Lúcia said that the Virgin Mary had predicted the deaths of her two cousins during the second apparition on 13 June 1917. According to Lúcia's 1941 account, on 13 June, Lúcia asked the Virgin if the three children would go to heaven when they died. She said that she heard Mary reply, "Yes, I shall take Francisco and Jacinta soon, but you will remain a little longer, since Jesus wishes you to make me known and loved on earth. He wishes also for you to establish devotion in the world to my Immaculate heart."

In 1947, Sister Lúcia left the Dorothean order and joined the Discalced Carmelite Order in a monastery in Coimbra, Portugal. Her cell was sealed off by the order of the Congregation for the Doctrine of the Faith as part of examination for her canonization, due to the revelations that sister Lúcia still had after the events at Fátima.

== Pilgrimage ==
The Sanctuary of Our Lady of Fátima is one of the largest Marian shrines in the world

The Basilica of Our Lady of the Rosary interior view

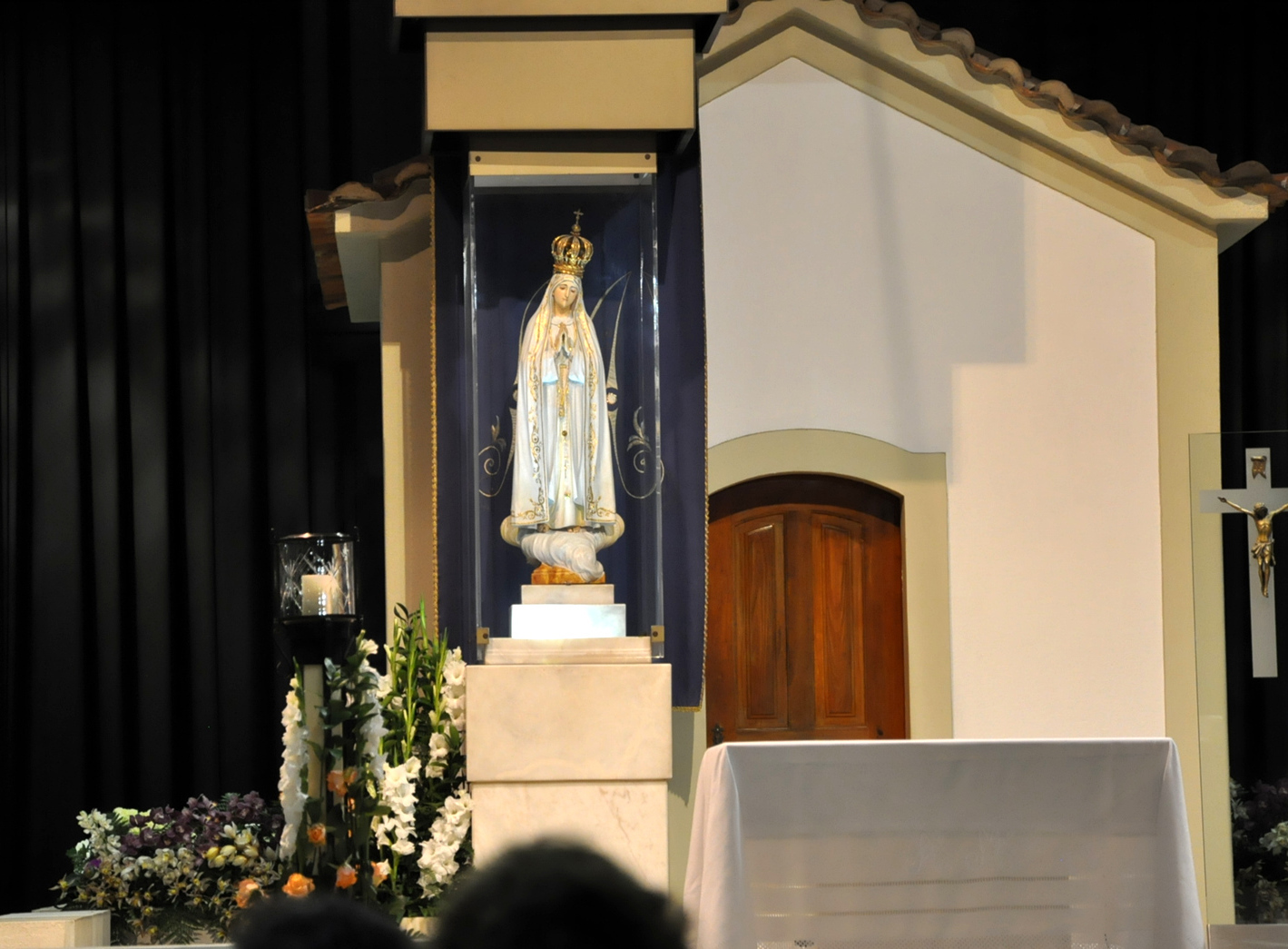
Image of Our Lady of Fátima in the Chapel of the Apparitions

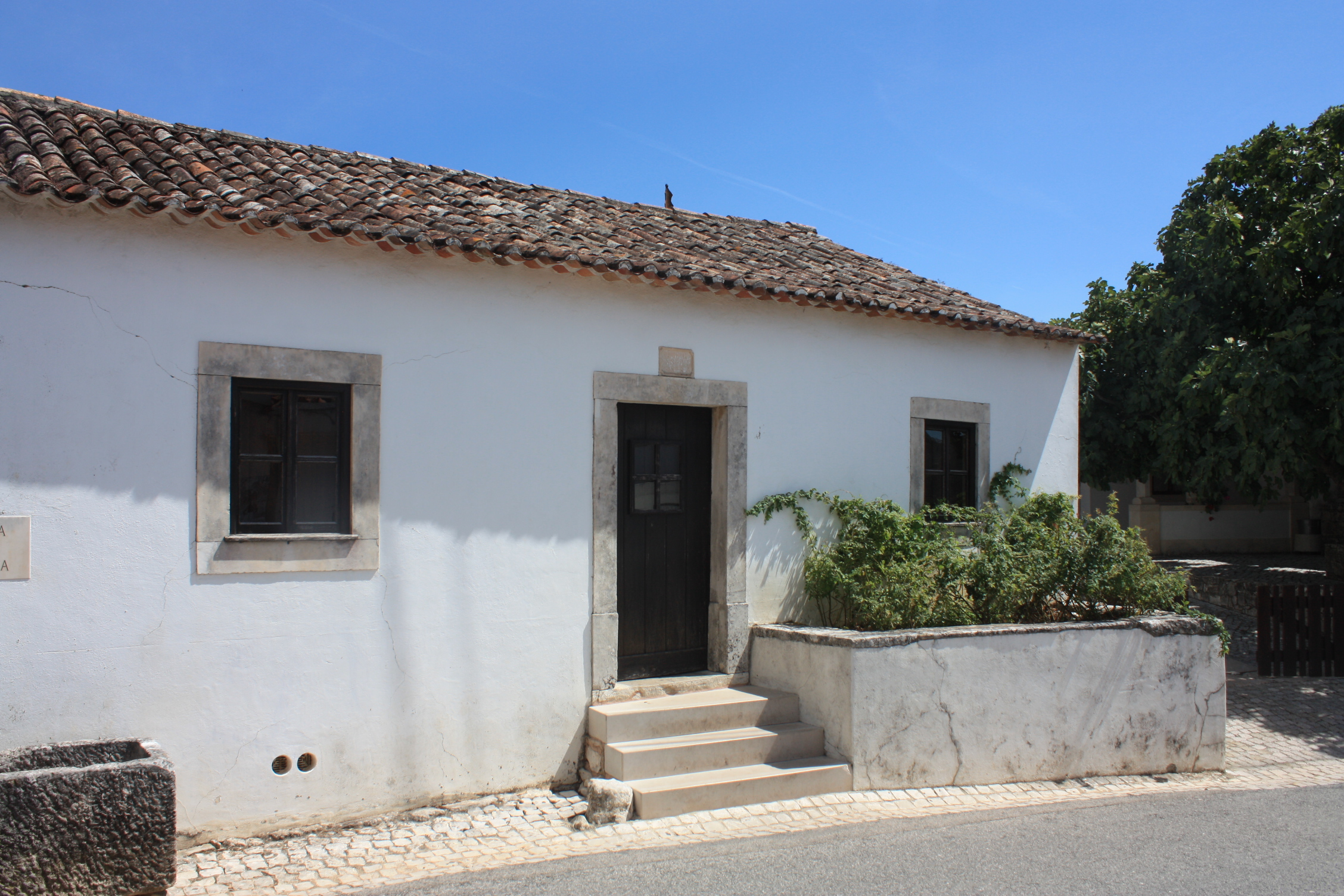
Birthplace of Venerable Sister Lúcia de Jesus Rosa dos Santos in Aljustrel

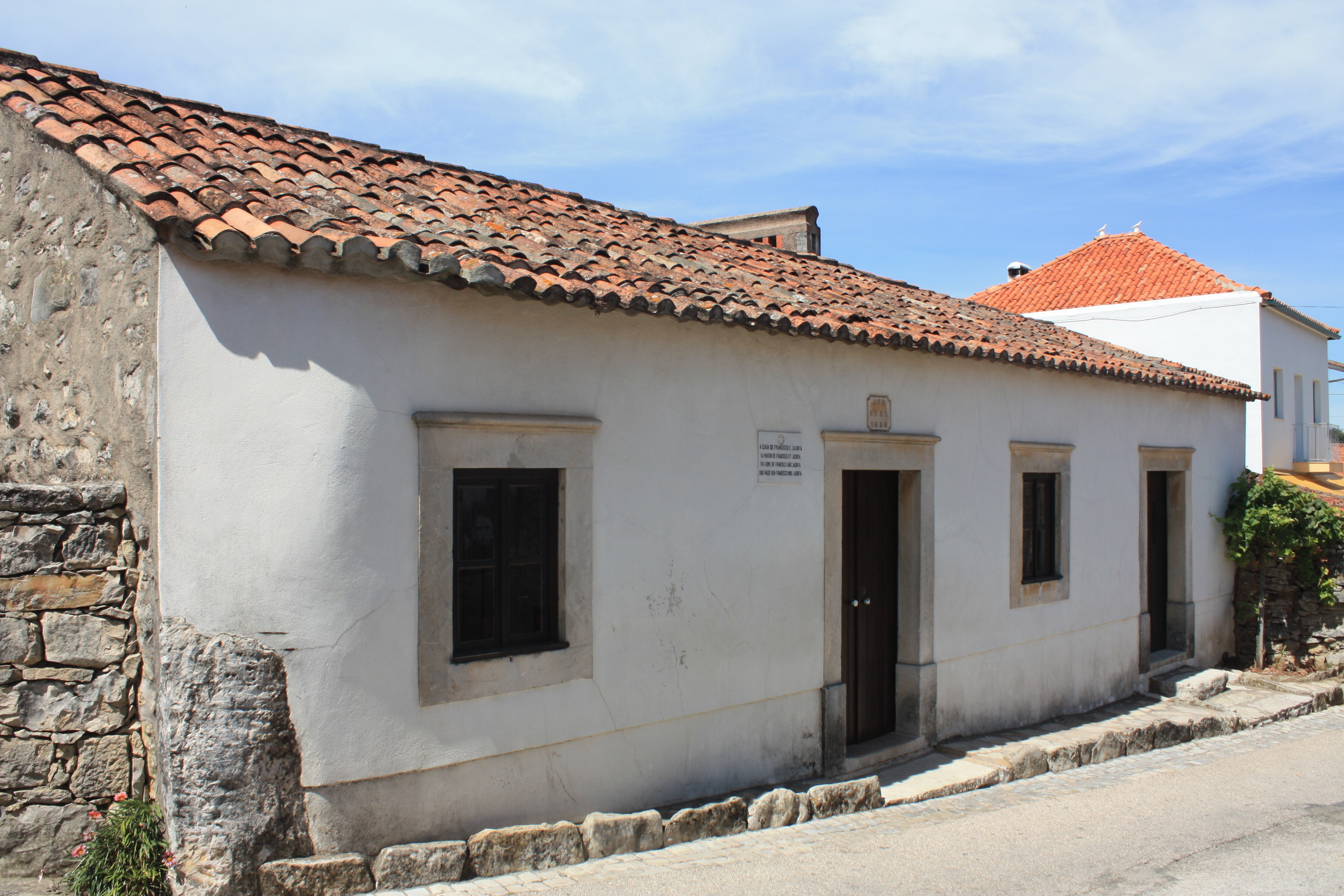
Birthplace of Saints Francisco and Jacinta Marto in Aljustrel

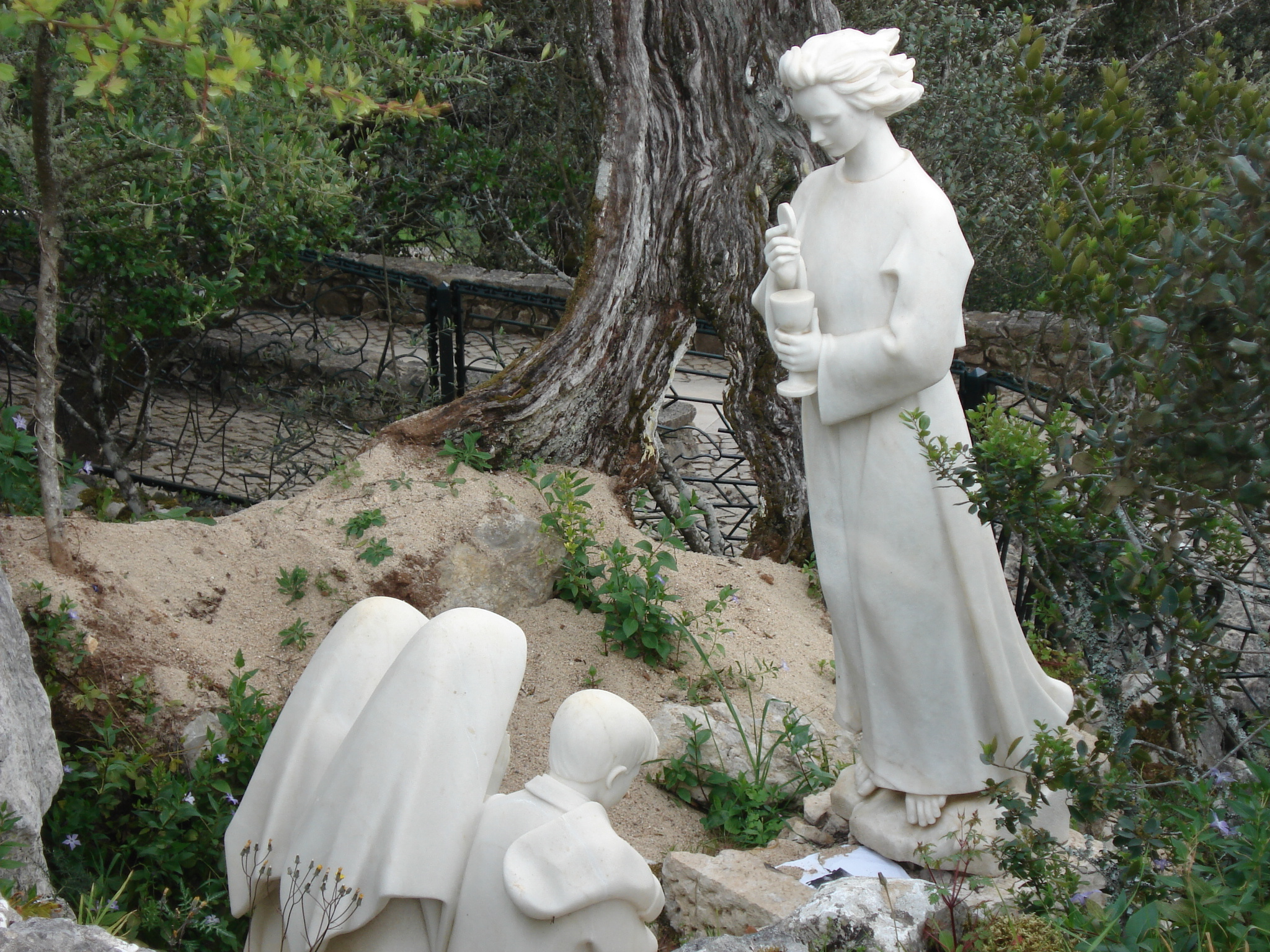
Monument of the Guardian Angel of Portugal apparition to the three little shepherd children of Fátima

The widely reported Miracle of the Sun quickly made Fátima a major pilgrimage centre. Two million pilgrims visited the site in the decade following the events of 1917. A small chapel – the Capelinha – was built by locals on the exact site of the Marian apparitions, where the holm oak stood.

On 13 May 1920, pilgrims defied government troops and enshrined a statue of the Virgin Mary in the chapel. Mass was first officially celebrated there in January 1924. A hostel for the sick was begun in that year. In 1927, the first rector of the sanctuary was appointed, and a set of Stations of the Cross were erected on the mountain road. The foundation stone for the Basilica of Our Lady of the Rosary was laid nearby the next year.

In 1930, the Catholic Church officially recognised the apparition events as "worthy of belief" and granted a papal indulgence to pilgrims visiting Fátima. In 1935, the bodies of the child visionaries, Francisco and Jacinta, were reinterred in the new basilica. Pope Pius XII granted a Canonical Coronation of the statue of Our Lady of Fátima on 13 May 1946. This event drew such large crowds that the entrance to the site had to be barred.

In the 21st century, pilgrimages to the site occur year-round. Additional chapels, hospitals and other facilities have been constructed at the site. The principal pilgrimages take place on the thirteenth day of each month from May to October, on the anniversaries of the original apparitions. The largest crowds gather on 13 May and 13 October, when up to a million pilgrims pray and witness processions of the statue of Our Lady of Fátima, both in the day and by the light of tens of thousands of candles at night.

== Official position of the Church ==
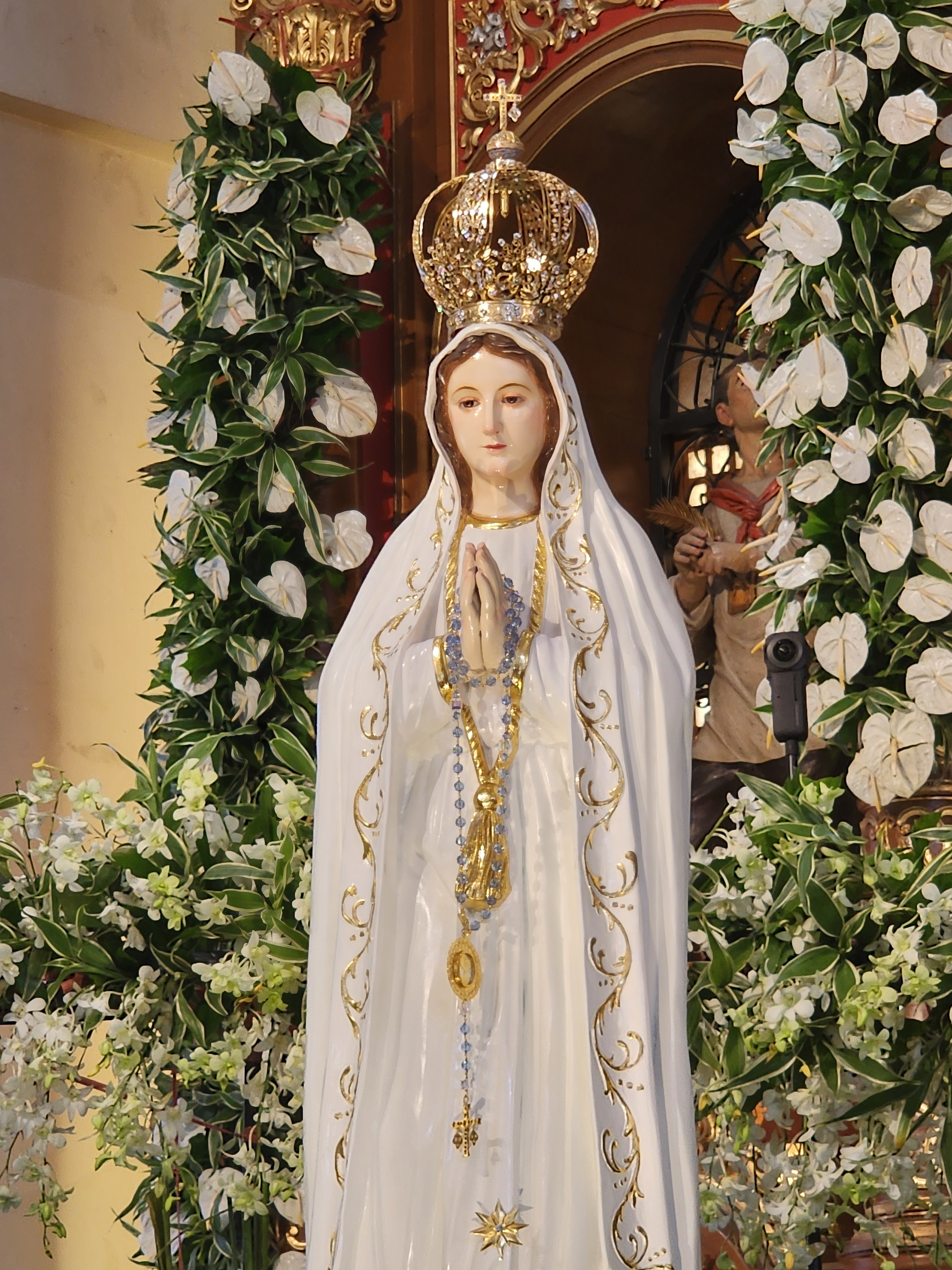
The venerated image of Our Lady of Fatima enshrined at the Shrine and Parish of Saint Paul of the Cross in Marikina. The image was pontifically crowned on 12 May 2024.

The reported visions at Fátima gathered widespread attention as numerous pilgrims began to visit the site. After a canonical inquiry, the Bishop of Leiria-Fátima officially declared the visions of Fátima as "worthy of belief" in October 1930, officially permitting the belief of Our Lady of Fátima.

== Political aspects ==
At the time of the apparitions, Portugal was undergoing tensions between the secularizing Republican government and more conservative elements in society. The First Republic had begun with the revolution of 1910, overthrowing the constitutional monarch. It was intensely anticlerical and provoked a strong conservative reaction, ultimately leading to the military coup of 1926. Later in Spain during the 1920s and 1930s, as the forces of the Second Republic gathered strength, armies of faithful Catholics carried images of the Virgin Mary, as protest and protection against groups they called godless.

During the Spanish Second Republic, apparitions of the Virgin Mary were seen on Spanish soil at Ezquioga. Ramona Olazabal said that Mary had marked the palms of her hands with a sword. The visions at Ezquioga were widely covered in the press, as were sixteen other visitations of the Virgin reported in 1931 in Spain. These visions gained much credence in Integrist and Carlist circles and conservative elements in the Spanish Catholic Church actively encouraged the Fátima devotion as a way of countering the threat of atheistic Communism. In Portugal and its former colony of Brazil, conservative groups were sometimes associated with the veneration of Fátima.

The original apparitions took place during the six months immediately preceding the Bolshevik Revolution in Russia, and the children related that the Lady talked to them about the need to pray for Russia. Lúcia admitted later that the children initially thought she meant prayers for a girl named "Russia". In the first edition of Sister Lúcia's memoirs, published after the outbreak of World War II, she focused on the issue of Russia. The warning by the Lady that "if Russia was not consecrated to God, it would spread errors throughout the world" was often seized upon as an anti-Communist rallying cry.

The Blue Army of Our Lady of Fátima, for instance, has always been strongly anti-Communist and its members often associated the Fátima story in the context of the Cold War. The Blue Army is made up of Catholics and non-Catholics who believe that by dedicating themselves to daily prayer (specifically recitation of the Rosary), they can help to achieve world peace and end to the error of Communism. Organizations such as the Blue Army (now called the World Apostolate of Fátima) have gained the approval of the Catholic Church.

== Memoirs of Sister Lúcia ==
The Fátima story developed in two parts: that which was reported in 1917 and 1922, and information later mentioned in Sister Lúcia's memoirs, which she wrote years later, after the church ruled that the events in Fátima were "worthy of belief." Some scholars argue that her memoir was not subject to the same scrutiny. The early messages focused on the need to pray the rosary for peace and the end to World War I.

The alleged supernatural events in Fátima were not widely known outside Portugal and Spain until Lúcia published her memoirs, starting in the late 1930s. Between 1935 and 1993, she wrote six memoirs. The first four, written between 1935 and 1941 during World War II, were published under the title Fatima in Lucia's Own Words (1976). The fifth and sixth memoirs, written in 1989 and 1993, are published as Fatima in Lucia's Own Words II.

In the mid-1930s the Bishop of Leiria encouraged Lúcia (at that time named Sister Maria Lúcia das Dores) to write her memoirs, so that she might reveal further details of the 1917 apparitions. In her first memoir, published in 1935, Sister Lúcia focused on the holiness of her cousin, Jacinta Marto. The deceased girl was by then, popularly considered a saint. In her second memoir, published in 1937, Lúcia wrote more about her own life, the apparition of 13 June 1917, and first reveals the earlier apparitions of the Angel of Peace.

Finding herself inundated with constantly repeated questions concerning the Marian apparitions that occurred in Fátima, Portugal, and the visionaries, the message they received and the reason for some of the requests contained in that message, and feeling that it was beyond her to reply individually to each questioner, Sister Lúcia asked the Holy See for permission to write a text in which she could reply in general to the many questions that had been put to her. This permission was granted and in December 2000, a new book was published entitled Calls from the Message of Fatima.

=== Three Secrets of Fátima ===
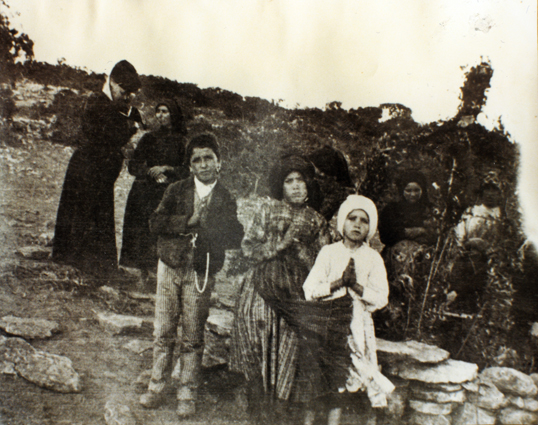
Lúcia with Francisco and Jacinta in 1917

In her third memoir of 1941, Sister Lúcia described three secrets. She said these had been entrusted to the children during the apparitions of 1917.

==== First Secret ====
This was a vision of Hell, which Lúcia said they experienced on 4 July 1917.

[Mary] opened Her hands once more, as She had done the two previous months. The rays [of light] appeared to penetrate the earth, and we saw, as it were, a vast sea of fire. Plunged in this fire, we saw the demons and the souls [of the damned].

The latter were like transparent burning embers, all blackened or burnished bronze, having human forms. They were floating about in that conflagration, now raised into the air by the flames which issued from within themselves, together with great clouds of smoke. Now they fell back on every side like sparks in huge fires, without weight or equilibrium, amid shrieks and groans of pain and despair, which horrified us and made us tremble with fright (it must have been this sight which caused me to cry out, as people say they heard me).

==== Second Secret ====
This was a recommendation for devotion to the Immaculate Heart of Mary as a way to save souls and bring peace to the world. It predicted an end to the Great War, but predicted a worse one if people did not cease offending God. This second war would be presaged by a night illuminated by an unknown light, as a "great sign" that the time of chastisement was near. To avert this, Mary would return to ask for the consecration of Russia to the Immaculate Heart, and the establishment of the First Saturdays Devotion. If her requests were heeded, Russia would be converted, and there would be peace; if not, Russia would spread her errors throughout the world, causing wars and persecutions of the Catholic Church. The vision culminated with a promise that in the end, "the Immaculate Heart would triumph. The Holy Father would consecrate Russia to Mary, and a period of peace would be granted to the world."

On 25 January 1938 (during solar cycle 17), bright lights, an aurora borealis appeared over the northern hemisphere, including in places as far south as North Africa, Bermuda and California. It was the widest occurrence of the aurora since 1709, and people in Paris and elsewhere thought it was a great fire and notified fire departments. Sister Lúcia indicated that it was the sign foretold and so apprised her superior and the bishop in letters the following day. Just over a month later, Hitler seized Austria and eight months later invaded Czechoslovakia.

===== Consecration of Russia =====
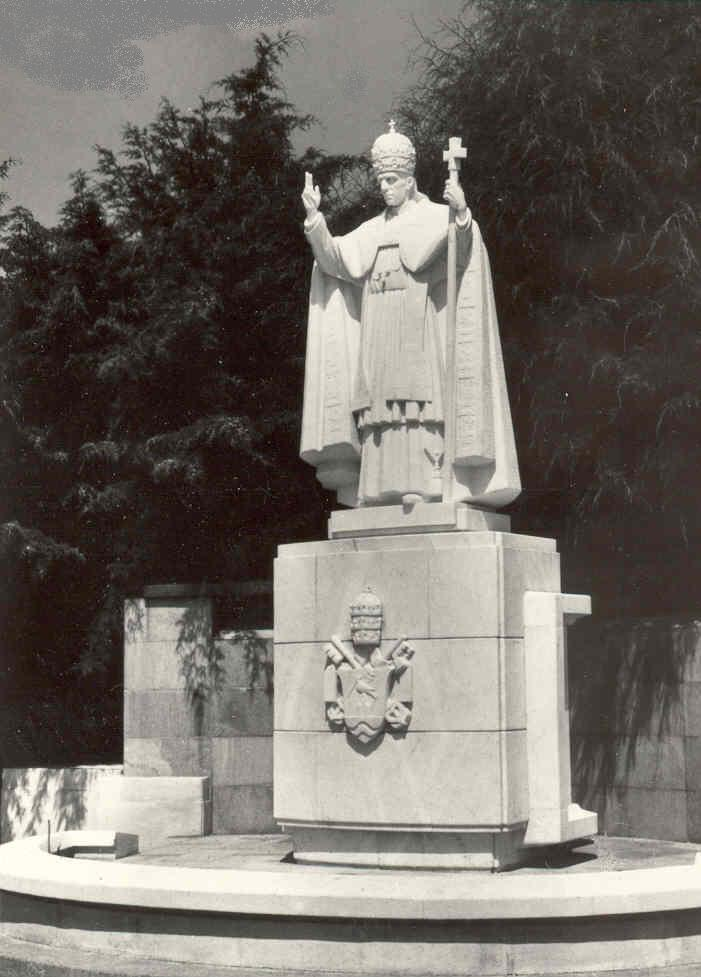
Statue of Pope Pius XII in Fátima, Portugal

According to Sister Lúcia, the Virgin Mary promised that the Consecration of Russia would lead to Russia's conversion and an era of peace. At the time the supposed request for the consecration of Russia was made, however, the Bolsheviks had not yet taken control of Russia.

Pope Pius XII, in his Apostolic Letter Sacro Vergente of 7 July 1952, consecrated Russia to the Blessed Virgin Mary. Pius XII wrote,

Just as a few years ago We consecrated the entire human race to the Immaculate Heart of the Virgin Mary, Mother of God, so today We consecrate and in a most special manner We entrust all the peoples of Russia to this Immaculate Heart...

In 1952 the Pope said to the Russian people and the Stalinist regime that the Virgin Mary was always victorious. "The gates of hell will never prevail, where she offers her protection. She is the good mother, the mother of all, and it has never been heard, that those who seek her protection, will not receive it. With this certainty, the Pope dedicates all people of Russia to the immaculate heart of the Virgin. She will help! Error and atheism will be overcome with her assistance and divine grace."

Popes Pius XII and John Paul II both had a special relationship with Our Lady of Fátima. Pope Benedict XV began Pacelli's church career, elevating him to archbishop in the Sistine Chapel on 13 May 1917, the date of the first apparition. Pius XII was laid to rest in the crypt of Saint Peter's Basilica on 13 October 1958, the anniversary of the final apparition and the Miracle of the Sun.

Pope John Paul II again consecrated the entire world to the Virgin Mary in 1984, without explicitly mentioning Russia. Some believe that Sister Lúcia verified that this ceremony fulfilled the requests of the Virgin Mary. However, in the Blue Army's Spanish magazine, Sol de Fátima, in the September 1985 issue, Sister Lúcia said that the ceremony did not fulfil the Virgin Mary's request, as there was no specific mention of Russia and "many bishops attached no importance to it." In 2001, Archbishop Tarcisio Bertone met with Sister Lúcia, who reportedly told him, "I have already said that the consecration desired by Our Lady was made in 1984, and has been accepted in Heaven." Sister Lúcia died on 13 February 2005, without making any further public statement of her own to settle the issue.

Some maintain that, according to Lúcia and Fátima advocates such as Abbé Georges de Nantes, Fr. Paul Kramer and Nicholas Gruner, Russia has never been specifically consecrated to the Immaculate Heart of Mary by any Pope simultaneously with all the world's bishops, which is what Lúcia in the 1985 interview had said Mary had asked for. Two interviews with Sister Lúcia, in 1992 and 1993, tape recorded and televised with her permission on Portuguese State Television RTP1 and on SIC, TVI and RAI 2, in March 1998, finally clarified the Seer's personal opinion regarding the Secret, Consecration and Conversion of Russia.

However, by letters of 29 August 1989 and 3 July 1990, she stated that the consecration had been completed; indeed in the 1990 letter in response to a question by the Rev. Father Robert J. Fox, she confirmed:

I come to answer your question, "If the consecration made by Pope John Paul II on 25 March 1984 in union with all the bishops of the world, accomplished the conditions for the consecration of Russia according to the request of Our Lady in Tui, Spain on 13 June 1929?" Yes, it was accomplished, and since then I have said that it was made.

And I say that no other person responds for me, it is I who receive and open all letters and respond to them.

In the meantime, the conception of Theotokos Derzhavnaya, an Orthodox Christian venerated icon, points out that the Virgin Mary is considered the actual Tsarina of Russia by the religious appeal of Nicholas II; thus, "Consecration of Russia" may refer to the return of the Russian monarchy. The icon was brought to Fátima in 2003 and 2014, together with another significant icon, the Theotokos of Port Arthur.

==== Third Secret ====
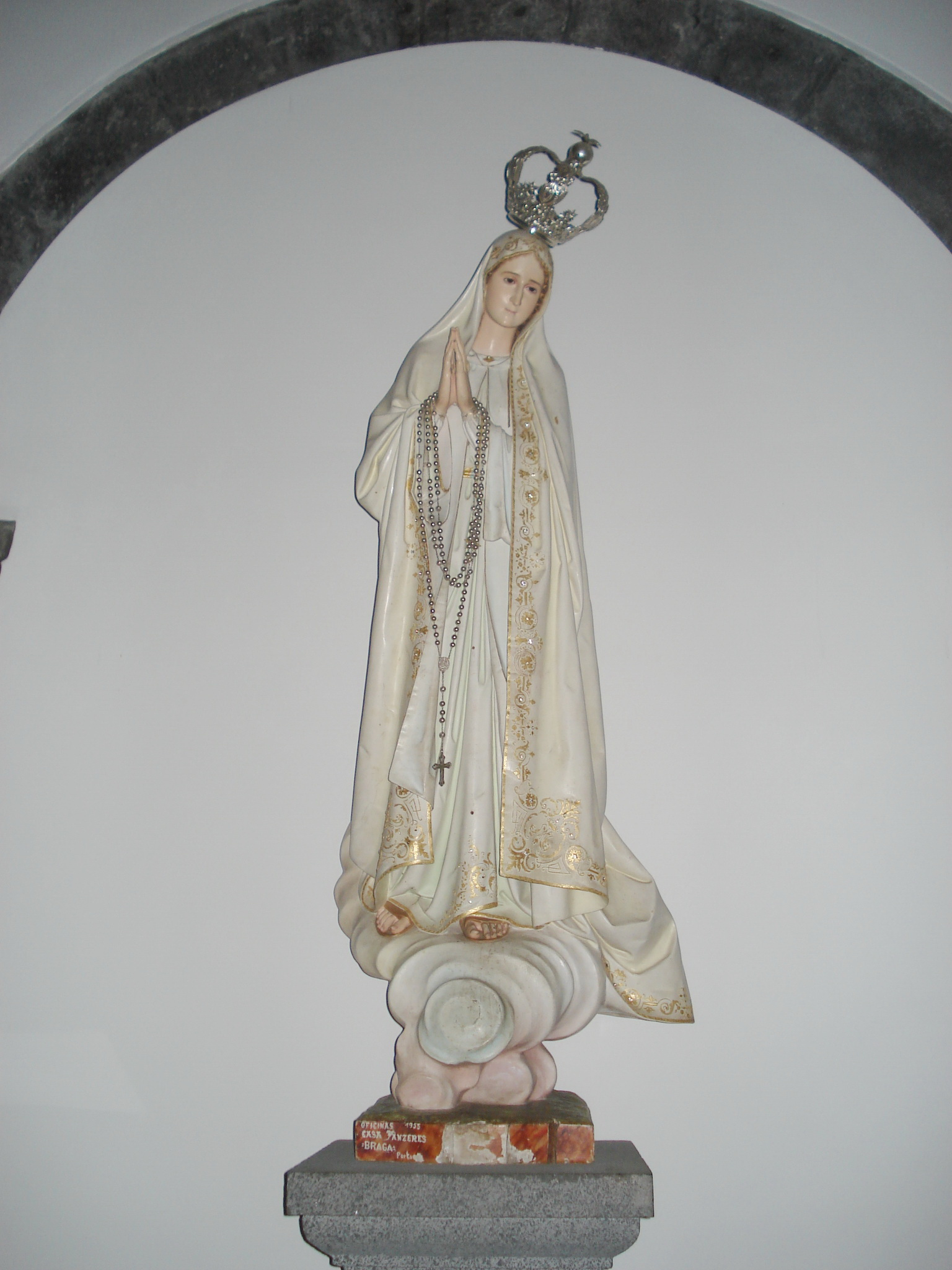
Statue of Our Lady of Fátima in the Church of Santa Maria Madalena, Madalena, the Azores, 2007. The devotion is especially popular among Catholics in Lusophone countries and the Portuguese diaspora.

The third secret, a vision of the death of the Pope and other religious figures, was transcribed by the Bishop of Leiria and reads:

"After the two parts which I have already explained, at the left of Our Lady and a little above, we saw an Angel with a flaming sword in his left hand; flashing, it gave out flames that looked as though they would set the world on fire; but they died out in contact with the splendour that Our Lady radiated towards him from her right hand: pointing to the earth with his right hand, the Angel cried out in a loud voice: 'Penance, Penance, Penance!' And we saw in an immense light that is God: 'something similar to how people appear in a mirror when they pass in front of it' a Bishop dressed in White 'we had the impression that it was the Holy Father'. Other Bishops, Priests, Religious men and women going up a steep mountain, at the top of which there was a big Cross of rough-hewn trunks as of a cork-tree with the bark; before reaching there the Holy Father passed through a big city half in ruins and half trembling with halting step, afflicted with pain and sorrow, he prayed for the souls of the corpses he met on his way; having reached the top of the mountain, on his knees at the foot of the big Cross he was killed by a group of soldiers who fired bullets and arrows at him, and in the same way there died one after another the other Bishops, Priests, Religious men and women, and various lay people of different ranks and positions. Beneath the two arms of the Cross there were two Angels each with a crystal aspersorium in his hand, in which they gathered up the blood of the Martyrs and with it sprinkled the souls that were making their way to God."

===== Controversy around the Third Secret =====
Lúcia declared that the Third Secret could be released to the public after 1960. Some sources, including Chanoine Barthas and Cardinal Ottaviani, said that Lúcia insisted to them it must be released by 1960, saying that, "by that time, it will be more clearly understood", and, "because the Blessed Virgin wishes it so." Instead, in 1960, the Vatican published an official press release stating that it was "most probable the Secret would remain, forever, under absolute seal." This announcement triggered widespread speculation. The New York Times wrote that speculation over the content of the secret ranged from "worldwide nuclear annihilation" to "deep rifts in the Catholic Church that lead to rival papacies."

The Holy See did not publish the Third Secret, a four-page, handwritten text, until 26 June 2000.

Such writers as Father Paul Kramer, Christopher Ferrara, Antonio Socci, and Marco Tosatti have suggested that this was not the full text of the secret and stating the Third Secret is not the full text. They alleged that Cardinals Bertone, Ratzinger and Sodano concealed the existence of another one-page document, containing information about the Apocalypse and a great apostasy.

The Vatican has maintained its position that the full text of the Third Secret was published. According to a December 2001 Vatican press release (published in L'Osservatore Romano), Lúcia told then-Archbishop Bertone in an interview that the secret had been completely revealed when published.

During his apostolic visit to Portugal during 11–14 May 2010 on the 10th anniversary of the beatification of Jacinta and Francisco Marto, Pope Benedict XVI explained to reporters that the interpretation of the third secret did not only refer to the attempted assassination of Pope John Paul II in Saint Peter's Square in 1981. He said that the third secret, "has a permanent and ongoing significance," and that, "its significance could even be extended to include the suffering the Church is going through today as a result of the recent reports of sexual abuse involving the clergy."

== Fátima prayers and reparations ==
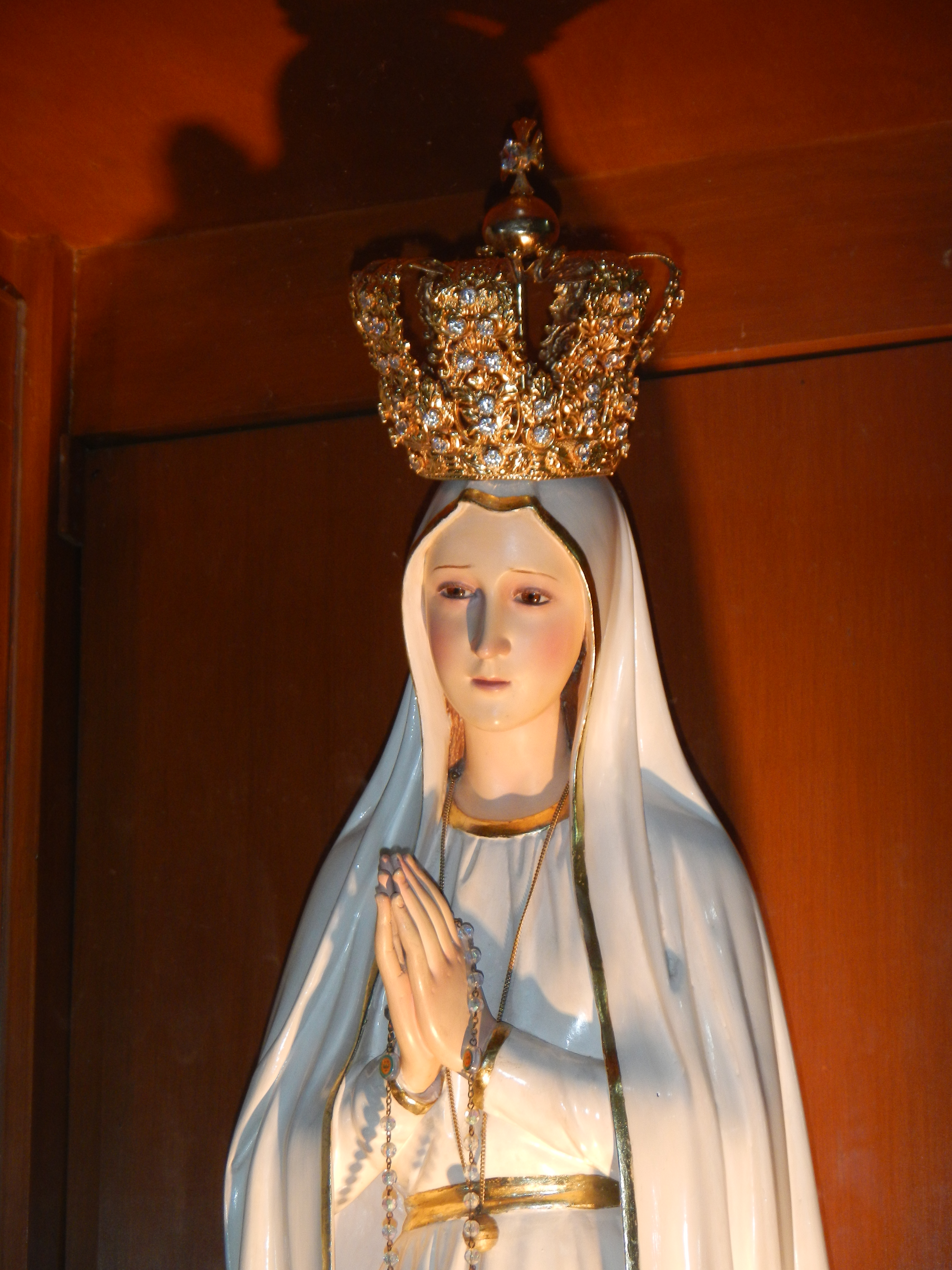
The National Pilgrim Image of Our Lady of Fatima enshrined at the National Shrine and Parish of Our Lady of Fatima in Valenzuela City. This is one of the images blessed by Pope Paul VI. The image was pontifically crowned on 25 February 2024.

Many Catholics recite prayers based on the apparitions of Our Lady of Fátima. Lúcia later said that, in 1916, she and her cousins had several visions of an angel calling himself the "Angel of Portugal" and the "Angel of Peace," who taught them to bow with their heads to the ground and to say "My God, I believe, I adore, I hope, and I love you. I ask pardon for those who do not believe, do not adore, do not hope and do not love you." Lúcia later set this prayer to music and a recording exists of her singing it. It was also said that sometime later, the angel returned and taught them a eucharistic devotion now known as the Angel Prayer.

Lúcia said that the Lady emphasized Acts of Reparation and prayers to console Jesus for the sins of the world. Lúcia said that Mary's words were, "When you make some sacrifice, say 'O Jesus, it is for your love, for the conversion of sinners, and in reparation for sins committed against the Immaculate Heart of Mary.'" At the apparition of 13 July 1917, Lúcia said Mary told the children that sinners could be saved from damnation by devotion to the Immaculate Heart, but also by making "sacrifices". They heard her repeat the idea of sacrifices several times. Her vision of hell prompted them to ever more stringent self-mortifications to save souls. Among many other practices, Lúcia wrote that she and her cousins wore tight cords around their waists, flogged themselves with stinging nettles, gave their lunches to beggars, and abstained from drinking water on hot days. Francisco and Jacinta became extremely devoted to this practice. Lúcia wrote that Mary said God was pleased with their sacrifices and bodily penances.

At the first apparition, Lúcia wrote, the children were so moved by the radiance that they involuntarily said "Most Holy Trinity, I adore you! My God, my God, I love you in the Most Blessed Sacrament." Lúcia also said that she heard Mary ask for the following words to be added to the Rosary after the Gloria Patri prayer: "O my Jesus, pardon us, save us from the fires of hell. Lead all souls to heaven, especially those in most need."

According to Vatican teaching on the tradition of Marian visitations, references to the "conversion of sinners" do not necessarily mean religious conversion to the Catholic Church. Pope Leo XIII, in his encyclical on the "Unity of the Church, Satis Cognitum", said that would mean the "conversion of heretics or apostates who are 'outside the church and alien to the Christian Faith.' Rather, "conversion of sinners" refers to general repentance and an attempt to amend one's life according to the teachings of Jesus for those true Catholics who are fallen into sins. Lúcia wrote that she and her cousins defined "sinners" not as non-Catholics but as those who had fallen away from the church or, more specifically, willfully indulged in sinful activity, particularly "sins of the flesh" and "acts of injustice and a lack of charity towards the poor, widows and orphans, the ignorant and the helpless," which she said were even worse than sins of impurity.

== Pontifical approbations ==
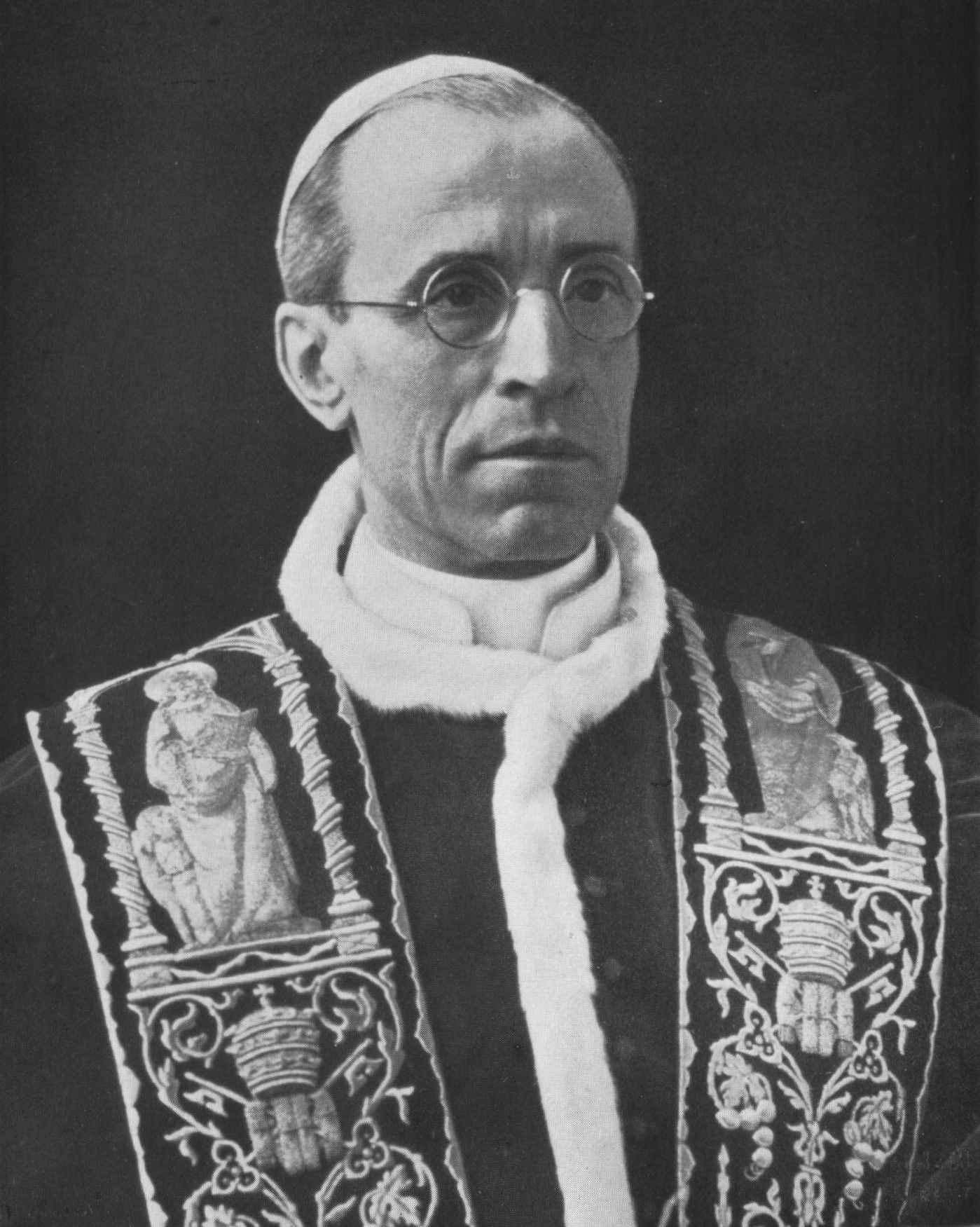
Pope Pius XII consecrated the human race to the “Immaculate Heart of the Blessed Virgin Mary” in 1942. The same Pontiff granted a decree of Canonical coronation to the statue of Our Lady of Fátima on 25 April 1946 via the Papal bull Celeberrima Solemnia and later raised her shrine to the status of Basilica in 1954.

Karl Rahner and other theologians opine that the Pontiff, by authoritatively fostering the Marian veneration in places such as Fátima and Lourdes, motivates the faithful into an acceptance of divine faith. In October 1930, Bishop da Silva declared that the apparitions at Fátima were "worthy of belief," and approved public devotion to the Blessed Virgin under the title Our Lady of Fátima. Since then, the Vatican granted indulgences and permitted special Liturgies of the Mass to be celebrated in Fátima.

=== Pope Pius XII ===
- Cardinal Eugenio Pacelli was consecrated as a bishop on 13 May 1917 – the day of the first apparition – and was elected to the papacy as Pope Pius XII in 1939. He is considered to have become "the Pope of Fátima." In 1940, after the Second World War had started, Sister Lúcia asked Pope Pius XII to consecrate the world and Russia to the Immaculate Heart of Mary. She repeated this request later that year on 2 December 1940, stating that in the year 1929, the Blessed Lady requested in another apparition that Russia be consecrated to her Immaculate Heart. Mary was said to promise the conversion of Russia from its errors.
- On 13 May 1942, the 25th anniversary of the first apparition and the silver jubilee of the episcopal consecration of Pope Pius XII, the Vatican published the "Message and Secret of Fátima."
- On 31 October 1942, Pius XII in a radio address to the people of Portugal discussed the apparitions of Fátima and consecrated the human race to the Immaculate Heart of the Virgin, with specific mention of "peoples of Russia".
- On 8 December 1942, the Pope officially and solemnly declared this consecration in a ceremony in Saint Peter's Basilica in Rome. This consecration was made in the context of the reported messages from Jesus and the Virgin Mary received by Alexandrina of Balazar, and communicated to her spiritual director, Mariano Pinho.
- On 25 April 1946, Pope Pius XII granted a pontifical decree of canonical coronation titled Celeberrima Solemnia for the statue of Our Lady. Cardinal Benedetto Masella was assigned as the papal legate who crowned the image on 13 May 1946.
- On 1 May 1948, in Auspicia Quaedam, Pope Pius XII requested the consecration to the Immaculate Heart of every Catholic family, parish and diocese.
- On 18 May 1950, the Pope again sent a message to the people of Portugal regarding Fátima:
  May Portugal never forget the heavenly message of Fátima, which, before anybody else she was blessed to hear. To keep Fátima in your heart and to translate Fátima into deeds is the best guarantee for ever more graces.
  In numerous additional messages, and in his encyclicals Fulgens Corona (1953), and Ad Caeli Reginam (1954), Pius XII encouraged the veneration of the Virgin in Fátima.
- On 11 November 1954, he raised the sanctuary to the status of basilica via the decree Luce Superna.

=== Pope Paul VI ===
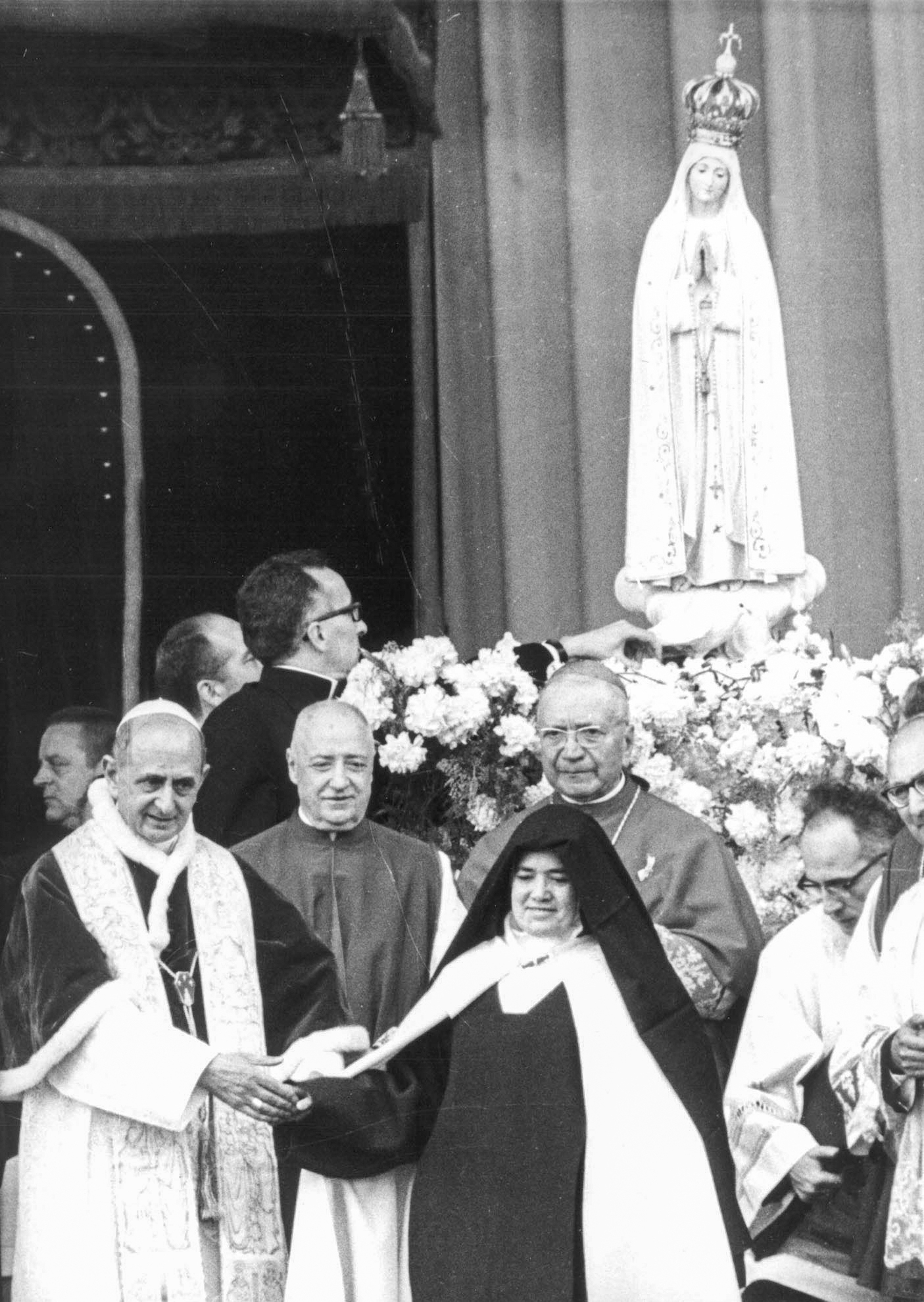
Pope Paul VI with Sister Lúcia in Fátima on 13 May 1967

At the end of the Second Vatican Council, Pope Paul VI renewed the consecration of Pius XII to the Immaculate Heart of Mary. In an unusual gesture, he announced his own pilgrimage to the sanctuary on the fiftieth anniversary of the first apparition. On 13 May 1967, he prayed at the shrine together with Sister Lúcia.

=== Pope John Paul II ===
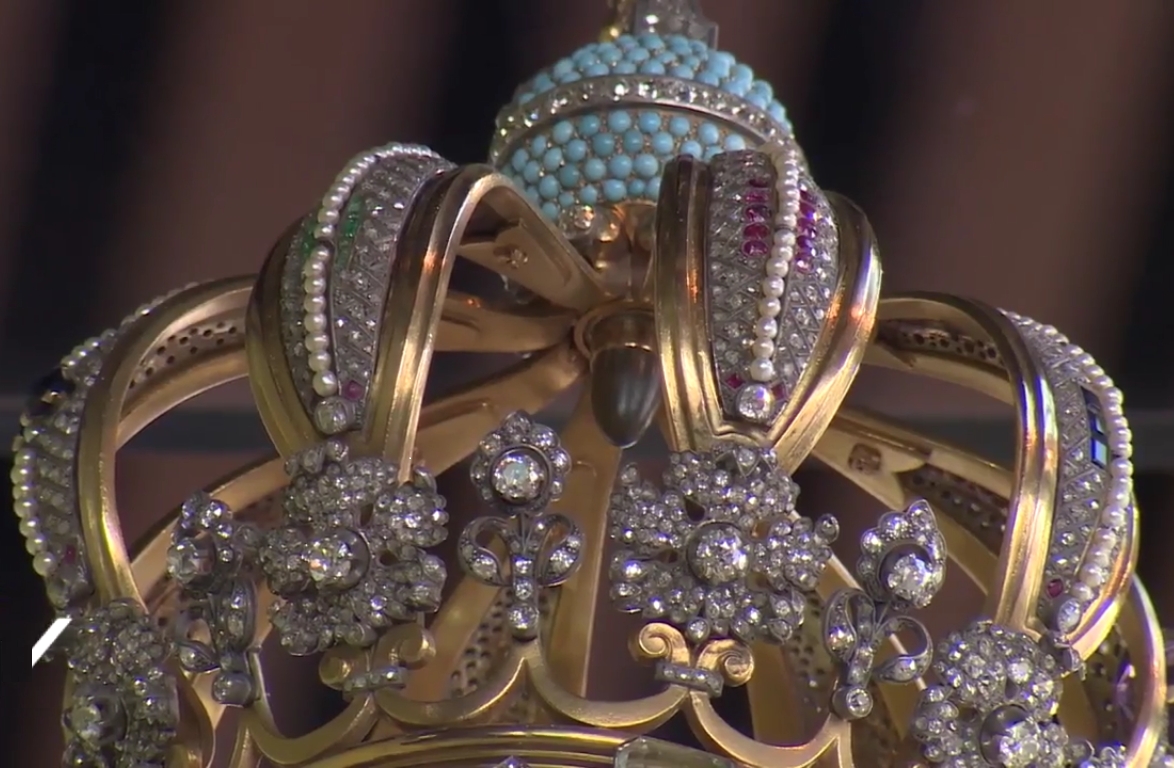
One of the bullets that struck Pope John Paul II in his 1981 assassination attempt was later encased in the crown of the statue of Our Lady of Fatima. In addition, one of his personal rosaries was given to the Portuguese sanctuary.

Pope John Paul II on 25 March 1984 consecrated "the world" in a public ceremony at St. Peter's in Rome; the consecration was in the form of a 'whole-world consecration' carried out in union with the Catholic bishops throughout the world. Cardinal Bertone said to the press many times that the message of Fátima was finished.

He further credited Our Lady of Fátima with saving his life following an assassination attempt on 13 May 1981, the Feast of Our Lady of Fátima. Then on 12 May 1982, he expressed his gratitude to the Virgin Mary for saving his life. The following day, he renewed the consecration of Pius XII to the Immaculate Heart of the Virgin.

In 1984, John Paul II offered to the statue of Fátima one of the bullets that struck him in the assassination attempt in St. Peter's Square, which is now encased in the image's crown.

=== Pope Benedict XVI ===
On 12–13 May 2010, Pope Benedict XVI visited the Sanctuary of Our Lady of Fátima and strongly stated his acceptance of the supernatural origin of the Fátima apparitions. On the first day, the Pope arrived at the Chapel of Apparitions to pray; he gave a Golden Rose to Our Lady of Fátima "as a homage of gratitude from the Pope for the marvels that the Almighty has worked through you in the hearts of so many who come as pilgrims to this your maternal home". The Pope also recalled the "invisible hand" that saved John Paul II. He said in a prayer to the Blessed Virgin Mary that "it is a profound consolation to know that you are crowned not only with the silver and gold of our joys and hopes, but also with the 'bullet' of our anxieties and sufferings."

On the second day, Pope Benedict spoke to more than 500,000 pilgrims; he referred to the Fátima prophecy about the triumph of the Immaculate Heart of Mary and related it to the final "glory of the Most Holy Trinity."

=== Pope Francis ===
Amid the 2022 Russian invasion of Ukraine, the Ukrainian Latin Catholic bishops requested Pope Francis to "... publicly perform the act of consecration to the Sacred Immaculate Heart of Mary of Ukraine and Russia, as requested by the Blessed Virgin in Fatima. May the Mother of God, Queen of Peace, accept our prayer: Regina pacis, ora pro nobis!"

Pope Francis consecrated Russia and Ukraine to the Immaculate Heart of Mary on 25 March 2022 at Saint Peter’s Basilica in Rome, stating: "Mother of God and our mother, to your Immaculate Heart we solemnly entrust and consecrate ourselves, the church and all humanity, especially Russia and Ukraine". A consecration ceremony also occurred in Fatima, Portugal, by the Papal almoner, Cardinal Konrad Krajewski. The Pope had announced the event via Twitter on 15 March 2022. It is unknown whether the consecration involved all the world's bishops on the same day or how it fulfilled the specific conditions of the Virgin's requests.

== Sainthood ==
In March 2017, the Holy See announced that Pope Francis would canonize two of the visionaries, Francisco and Jacinta Marto, on 13 May at a Mass in Fátima during a two-day visit. The decision followed papal confirmation of a miracle attributed to the intercession of the two visionaries. The pope canonized the children on 13 May 2017 during the centennial of the first apparition.

Sister Lúcia's cause for canonization is ongoing, and she was declared Venerable by Pope Francis on 22 June 2023.

== Other images of Our Lady of Fátima ==
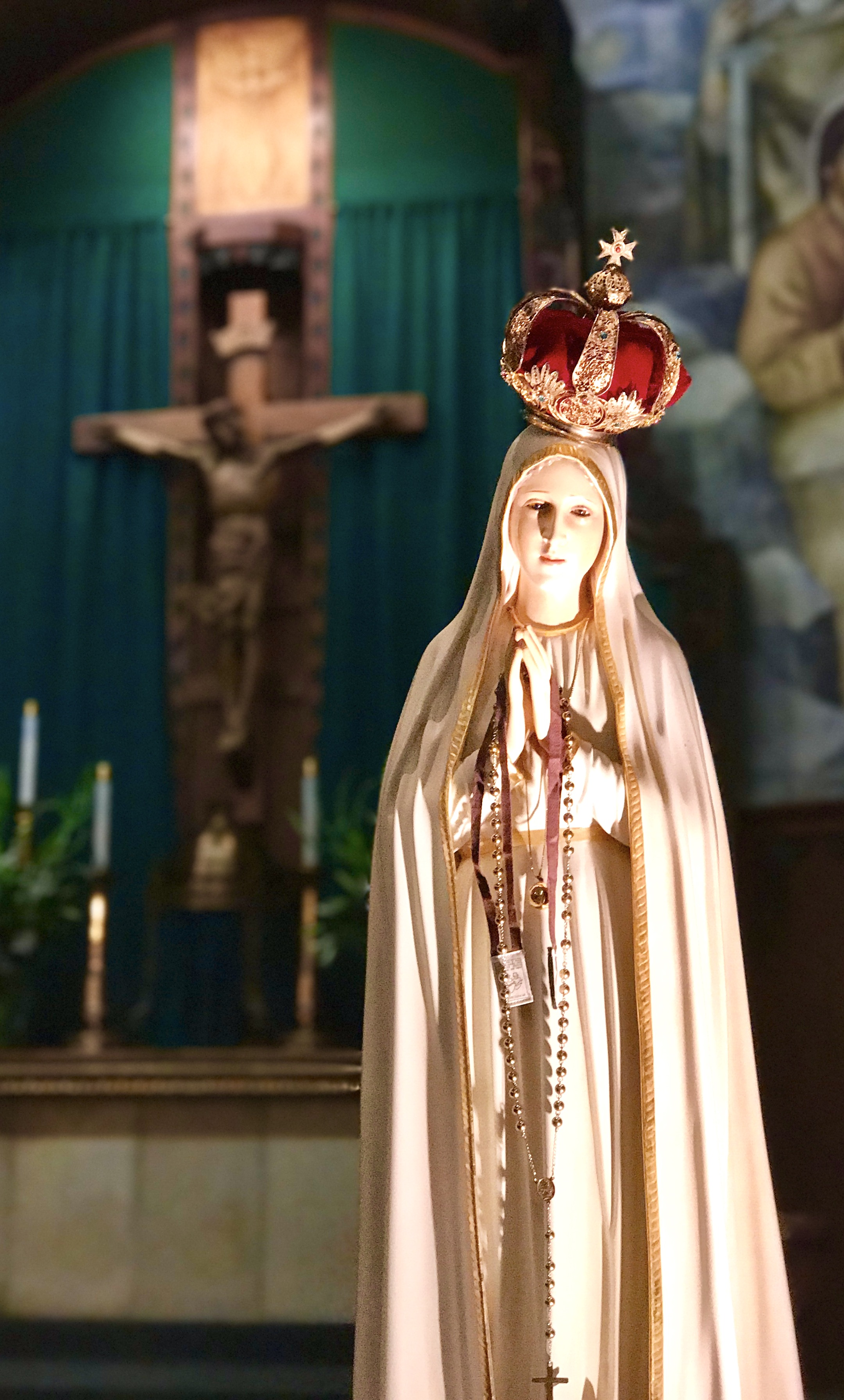
The International Pilgrim image of Our Lady of Fátima has traveled the world since the 1950s.

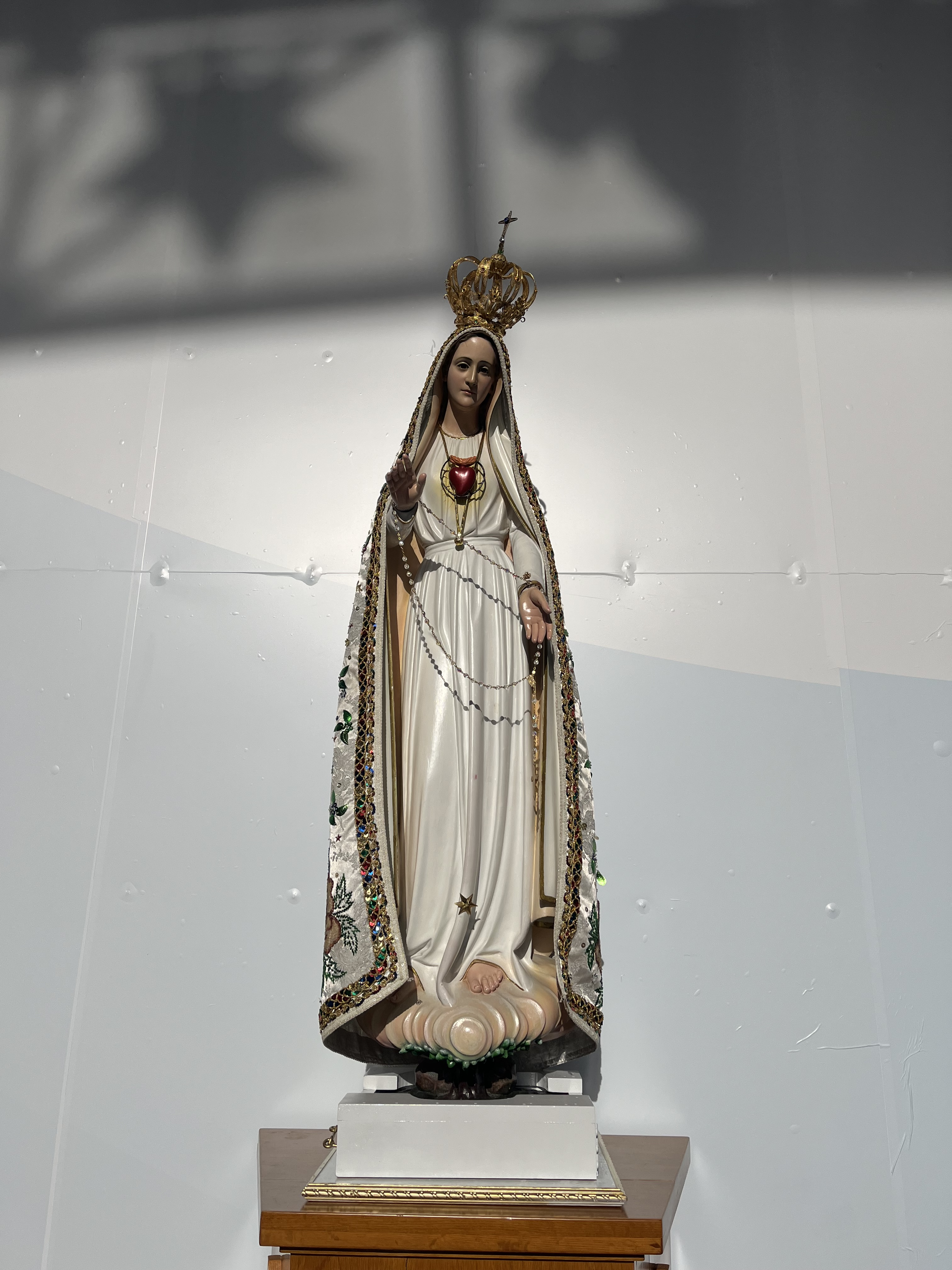
The International Pilgrim Statue of Fátima with the Immaculate Heart, the central icon of Marian Days in Carthage, Missouri. Since 1984, the Congregation of the Mother of the Redeemer has been given custody of the statue.

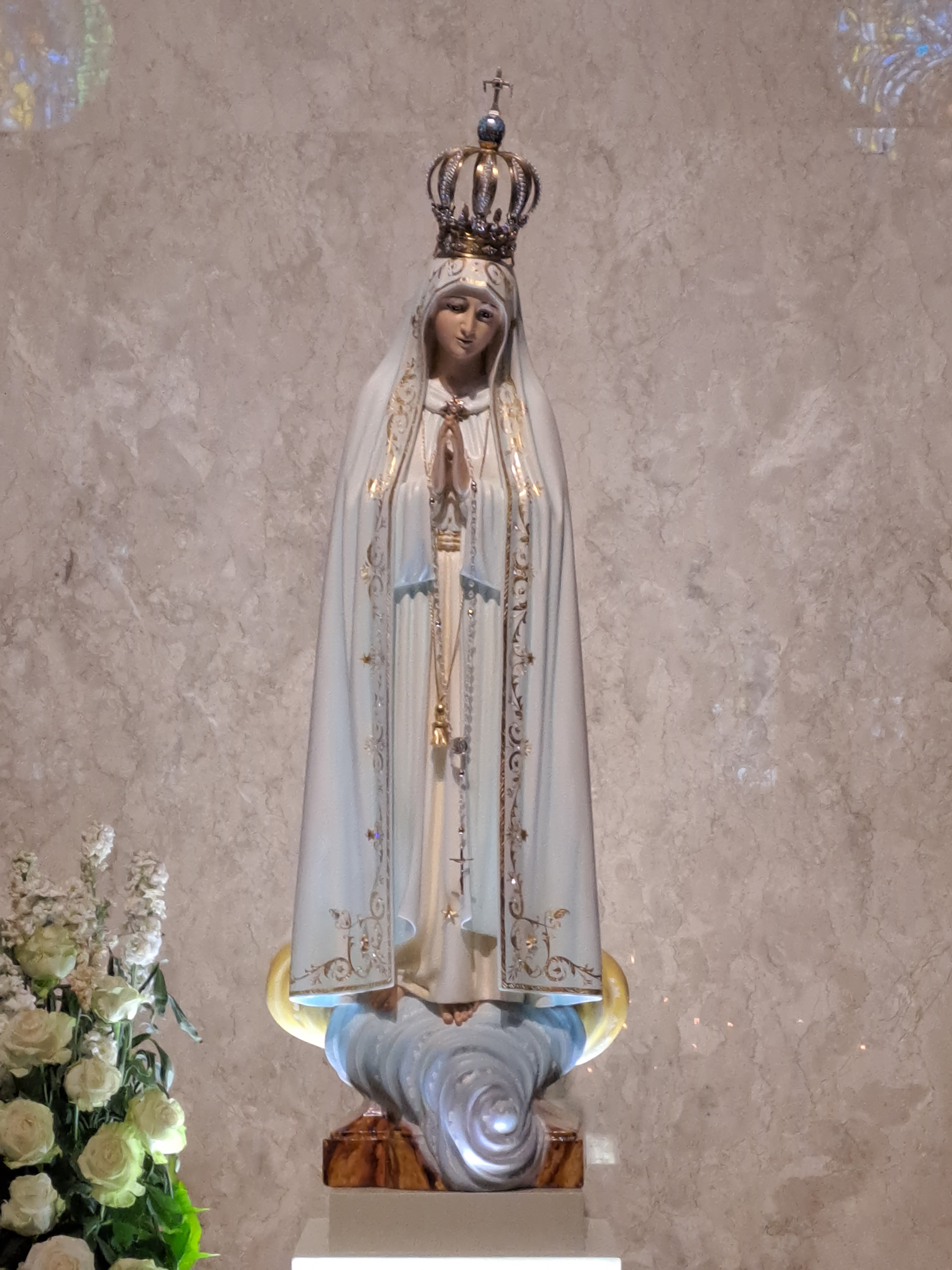
A replica of the original image at the Manila Cathedral

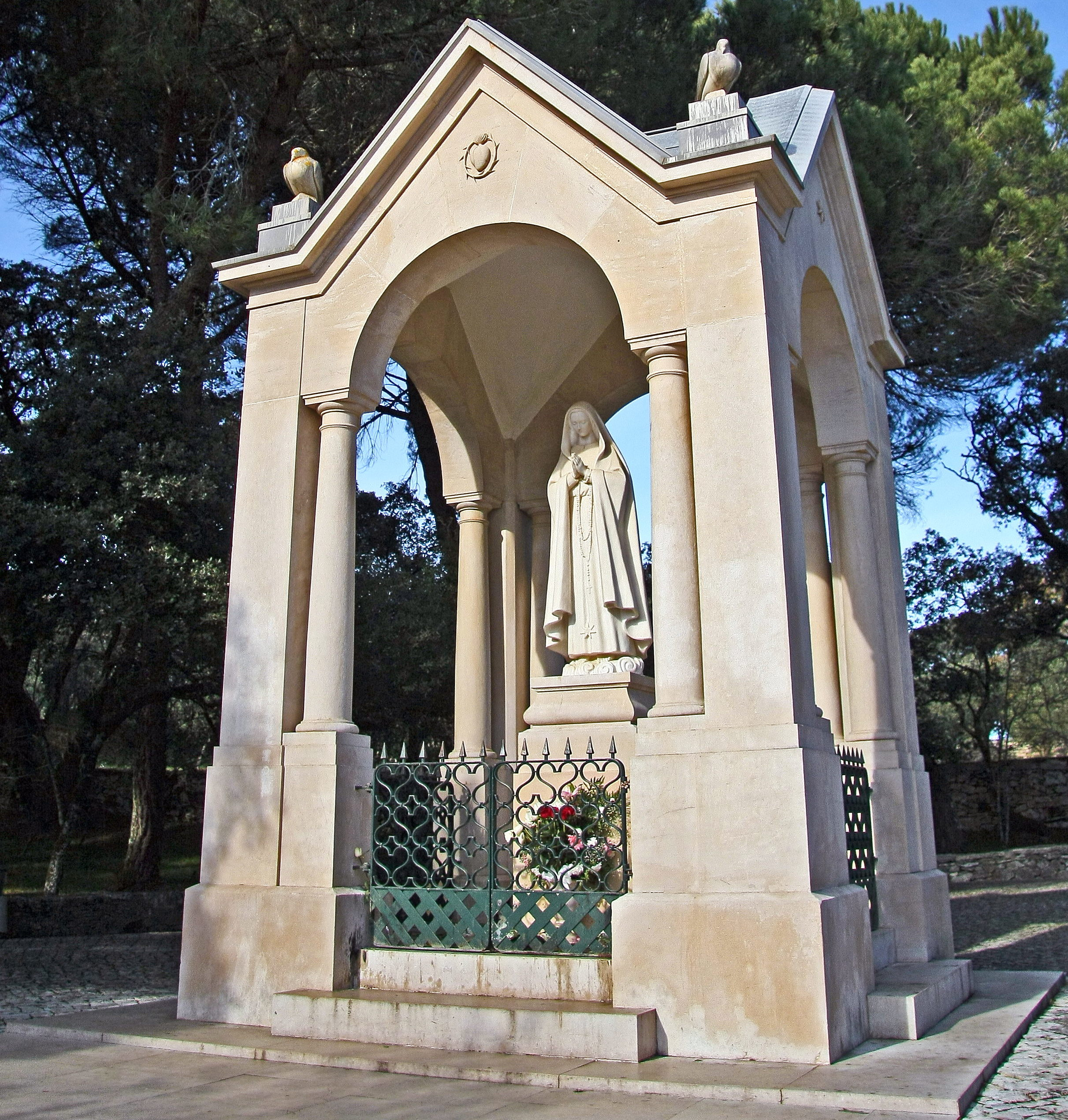
Statue by Amélia Carvalheira dedicated to the apparition of Our Lady which occurred exceptionally on 19 August 1917, in Valinhos, near Cova da Iria

Several statues of Our Lady under Fátima's title are notable, among which are the following:

- The first sculpture, carved by José Ferreira Thedim in 1920, now enshrined within the Chapel of the Apparitions. It was canonically crowned on 13 May 1946 by Pope Pius XII. Since 1981, this image was venerated by Pope John Paul II, who gave a bullet from his attempted assassination to the sanctuary, which added it to the statue's crown in the late 1980s.
- The Immaculate Heart of Mary, installed above the main façade of Fátima's basilica.
- Two copies of the International Pilgrim Statue of Fátima, informally known as the Pilgrim Statue, have been taken around the world to Catholic audiences. The second was sent to the Americas after being blessed on 13 October 1947 by the local bishop of Leiria. Subsequent copies have similarly been circulated internationally, including one smuggled into the US embassy to the Soviet Union, which was subsequently put on display.
- Another statue bearing the same name but with a depiction of the Immaculate Heart was created under the supervision of Lucia and blessed by Pope John XXIII. For a span of three years, starting in 1965, the statue visited all the regions of South Vietnam with the approval of the Australian Blue Army, in place of the International Pilgrim Statue of Fátima. The visitation took place during the ongoing Vietnam War. Some time after the visit, the statue was brought back to Portugal to the headquarters of the Blue Army, the Regina Pacis House. In 1984, with the help of representatives of the US Blue Army, the statue was entrusted to the Congregation of the Mother of the Redeemer and enshrined in the Immaculate Heart of Mary Shrine in Carthage, Missouri. The statue is removed once a year during the Marian Days celebration for a procession around Carthage, and makes visits to Vietnamese communities across the diaspora.
- The so-called U.N. Virgin Fátima statue, which once stood in the chapel of the Headquarters of the United Nations in New York City, United States. It was blessed by the Bishop of Leiria on 13 October 1952.
- A statue of Our Lady of Fátima is carried in procession as part of the festival of Quyllur Rit'i, held in the highlands of the mountains Sinaqara and Qullqipunku in Cusco Region, Peru. The festival attracts 10,000 pilgrims annually.
- A statue of Our Lady of Fátima is carried in procession through the streets of Gwardamanġa, Malta, accompanied by fireworks, as part of the Festa of Our Lady of Fátima, held annually.
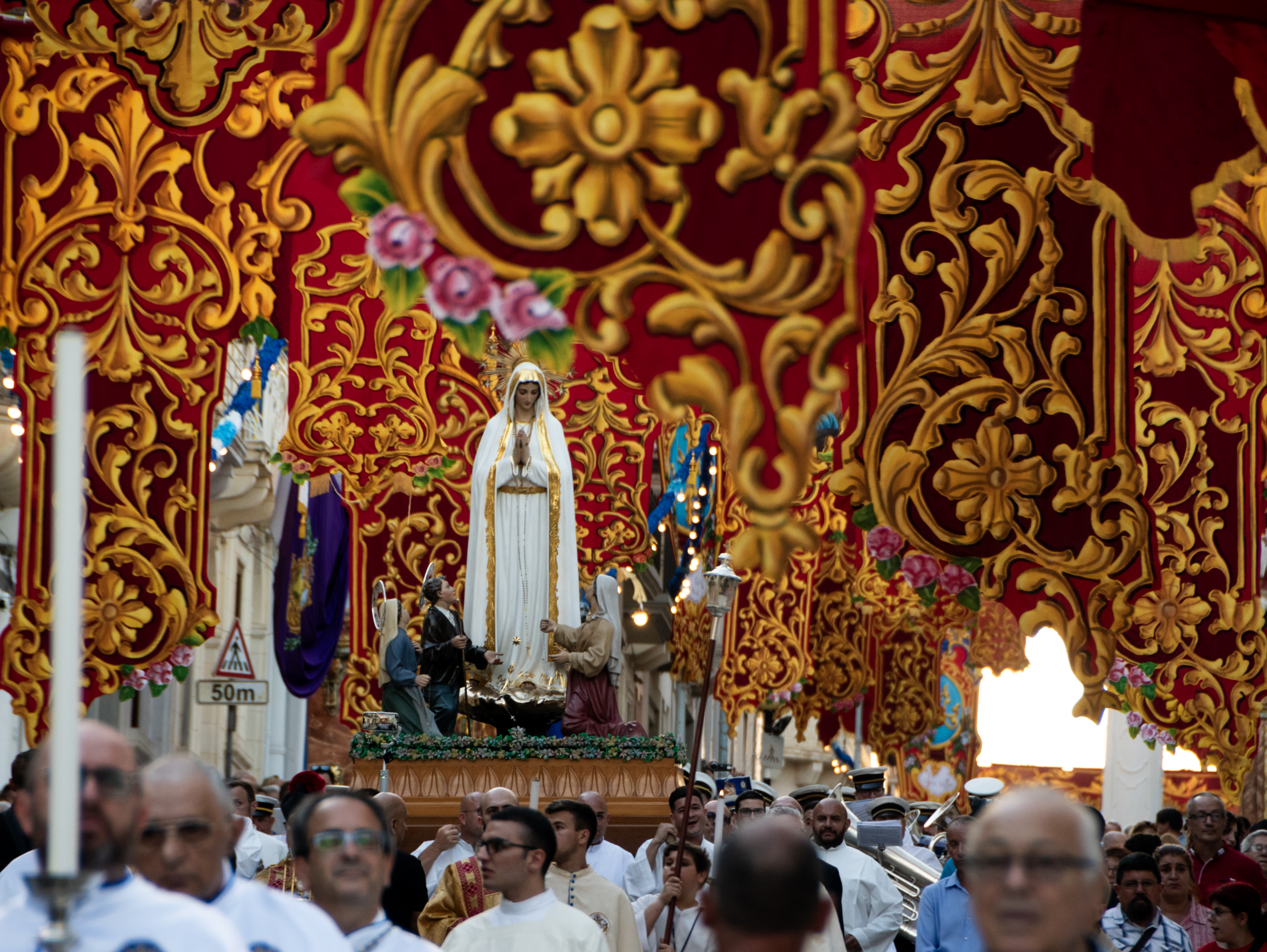
  Procession of Our Lady of Fátima, Gwardamanġa, Malta
- The National Pilgrim Image of Our Lady of Fátima-Philippines, also known as the EDSA Image, is a gift to the Philippines from the Sanctuary of Fátima, enshrined at the National Shrine of Our Lady of Fatima in Valenzuela in Metro Manila. It was blessed by Pope Paul VI in 1967 on the 50th anniversary of the Apparitions. It was crowned as the National Pilgrim Image in 1984 by Cardinal Jaime Sin, Archbishop of Manila, and became the main Fátima's image during the peaceful People Power Revolution in 1986 that ousted the dictatorship of President Ferdinand Marcos. The image has been since been brought around the country to various churches and schools. The image was given an episcopal coronation by the late José Oliveros, Bishop of Malolos, on 13 May 2017, with the crown and rosary as gifts from the Sanctuary of Fátima. Pope Francis issued a decree of canonical coronation for the image on 21 November 2023; the coronation took place on 25 February 2024.

== Scepticism ==
The Fátima apparitions have been embroiled in great controversy since their inception, with heated arguments involving not only atheists and agnostics, but also Catholics. Skeptics doubt the existence of the apparitions, the veracity of the dialogues, the miracles, and the cures. Some say the apparitions have nothing to do with religion; others treat the events as a grand staging. The Catholic Church itself seems to have been very cautious, not recognizing the apparitions as credible until October 1930. Cardinal Manuel Gonçalves Cerejeira stated that "it was Fátima that imposed itself on the Church".

The first accounts of the apparitions given by the little shepherds in 1917 and the story told in Lúcia's Memoirs clearly differ in text and content. In fact, even some Catholics, like the Jesuit Edouard Dhanis, suggest that there are two different Fatimas: "Fátima I" (the one in the 1917 accounts) and "Fátima II" (the one revealed in the "memoirs" of the main seer, written between 1935 and 1941).

Father Mário de Oliveira, author of some books on Fátima, commented that the God announced and revealed in the Memoirs of Sister Lucia – "has nothing to do with the God revealed in Jesus of Nazareth. It has everything to do with a bloodthirsty God who delights in the suffering of the innocent, a God who creates hell to punish those who fail to go to Mass on Sundays or say bad words, a God who is even worse than some of his creatures." He notes that Jacinta and Francisco were capable of going entire days without eating or drinking a drop of water, even in the middle of August, and walking around all day, and even in their sleep at night, with a rope permanently tied to their waist, in what the author calls "religious masochism". About Lúcia, the writer says that she was taken from her homeland and forever prevented from leading a life in any way similar to that of common people (she was secretly interned in the Vilar Asylum in Porto, and then she was sent to Spain and made a cloistered nun for the rest of her life).

Alfredo Barroso, journalist and politician, claims that the "Miracle of Fatima" never existed, and that it is a "product of illiteracy, ignorance and the beliefs of three children terrorised by the image of a cruel, vengeful and punishing God". For Barroso, the "miracle of Fatima" became a weapon to hurl against the Republic, freedom and democracy, against atheism and communism, in a classic alliance between "the sword and the hyssop" under the aegis of the dictator Salazar.

Tomás da Fonseca, author of some books on the subject and one of Fátima's fiercest critics, considers it "the biggest hoax of this century". He claims that three priests – Manuel Marques Ferreira, Benevenuto de Sousa, and Abel Ventura do Céu Faria – took it upon themselves to promote the apparitions for profit, but evidence is scant and weak. João Ilharco, a professor, wrote a book that caused the loss of his job, Fátima desmascarada (1971), in which he furthers similar claims, but also lacks evidence. The journalist and writer Patrícia Carvalho states that the gratuitous attacks and accusations against specific figures of the Church, without irrefutable proof, characterised the first texts opposing Fatima, as well as some of the books later published about it.

=== The descriptions of the Lady (1917–1922) ===
Soon after the events of 1917, the parish priest, Manuel Marques Ferreira, conducted successive interrogations of the three children after each apparition; Father José Fereira de Lacerda and the Rev. Manuel Nunes Formigão also spoke to them. Rev. Formigão wrote notes and books on the subject.

The testimonies by the three children (especially that of Lúcia, the most gifted of the seers) state that the apparition was about more or less one meter tall (Note: José Ferreira de Lacerda (15 October 1917) in O Mensageiro (newspaper).) and looked like a child 12 to 15 years old, of extraordinary beauty. She had black eyes. She was dressed in a luminous white that hurt the eyes. Lúcia and Jacinta relate that her skirt (sic) was white and gold, with strings running from top to bottom and across, and was short, to her knees or a little below, and tight. She had white socks. Her coat was white, and she also wore a white cloak that fell from her head to the hem of her skirt, with gold strings running from top to bottom. The jacket had two or three strings on the cuffs. She had a golden cord around her neck, which ended with a ball or a medal; she had very small yellow buttons (or rings – in Portuguese: arrecadas) in her ears. In her hands she carried a rosary of white beads, also luminous, which ended in a cross. In the words of Lúcia, on her head she had a sort of "small basket" (in Portuguese: açafatezinho or, a açafatico) which also radiated light. She never smiled. Francisco also said that she spoke without moving her lips.

The image that is venerated today was "with minor changes in detail" inspired by an existing image of Our Lady of Lapa. Manuel Nunes Formigão commented: "Our Lady can only appear as decently and modestly dressed as possible. The dress should go down to about her feet". The length of the skirt was something scandalous for the times; and Rev.Formigão said it was the most serious difficulty to the supernaturality of the apparition, maybe a mystification by the "spirit of darkness".

Chanoine Barthas refers to the apparition as "the wonderful young lady" and admits that "she does not resemble any of the images of the Blessed Virgin or other saints" that they have seen up to that point. Later descriptions of the Lady progressively move away from these primordial accounts, until it is difficult to recognise them. The image of the Lady was given a more "classic" appearance, and in 1930, Dr. Gonzaga da Fonseca, in Rome, already described the Lady wearing a tunic and a mantle that descends to the bare feet.

== In popular culture ==
Our Lady of Fátima was played by an uncredited Virginia Gibson in the 1952 film The Miracle of Our Lady of Fatima. Joana Ribeiro played the same role in the 2020 film Fatima. The Three Secrets of Fátima and the three Fatima seers are major plot points in the 2022 science-fiction visual novel Anonymous;Code.

== See also ==
- Blue Army of Our Lady of Fátima
- Fatima Movement of Priests
- First Saturdays Devotion
- Pope John Paul II assassination attempt
- Signum Magnum (apostolic exhortation)
