= Dominican Nuns of the Perpetual Rosary =

Religious institute

The Dominican Nuns of the Perpetual Rosary are a religious institute founded in 1880 in Calais, France, by Father Damien-Marie Saintourens, Mother Rose of Saint Mary Werhle and Mother Mary Imelda Gauthier, all of them from the Order of the Preachers (Dominican Order).

The nuns of the Order of Preachers, known as Dominican, came into being when Saint Dominic of Guzmán gathered Albigensian women converts to the Catholic Faith in the Monastery of Our Lady of Prouille, France, in 1206. This occurred ten years before his Friars Preachers were approved in 1216 by Pope Honorius III. These nine women, free for God alone, Dominic associated with his "holy preaching" by their prayer and penance. He entrusted them as part of the same apostolic Order to the fraternal concern of his sons. (LCM) The Order of Friars Preachers is known from the beginning to have been instituted especially for worldwide preaching and salvation of souls.

The first American Perpetual Rosary monastery was established at the Blue Chapel, Union City, New Jersey, in 1891.

In 1896, six of the sisters left Union City to build a convent in Milwaukee, Wisconsin. The Milwaukee community is cloistered and is referred to as the Dominican Sisters of the Perpetual Rosary, and is still in operation. The sisters originated the Archdiocesan Marian Shrine, which was later sold to the Roman Catholic Archdiocese of Milwaukee.

In 1919, fifteen sisters led by Mother Mary Imelda Gauthier, O.P., left Union City to found the Monastery of Our Lady of the Rosary in Summit, New Jersey.

The Dominican, Cloistered, Contemplative Nuns of the Perpetual Rosary monastery was founded by the one in Catonsville, Maryland (now closed). On June 10, 1925, Mother Mary of the Crown, O.P., as Prioress, together with eight other Sisters began a new house in South Enola, close to Harrisburg, Pennsylvania. Later in 1946, the Union City Monastery sent six Sisters to help out as vocations were slow in coming, due to the remoteness of the area. Because of structural deficiencies, a new monastery was built in Lancaster, Pennsylvania, in 1952. Under the direction of the Most Reverend George L. Leech, Bishop of Harrisburg, it was dedicated to the Immaculate Heart of Mary, appointing Mother Mary of the Immaculate Heart, O.P. as Prioress.

On August 17, 1944, Mother Mary Dominic, O.P. and Mother Mary of the Child Jesus, O.P. of the Catonsville, Maryland monastery founded the Dominican Monastery of St. Jude in Marbury, Alabama. As an interracial cloister in the United States, the community no longer stands, but after becoming Dominican Nuns maintains the Perpetual Rosary heritage and the Divine Office (see Liturgy of the Hours, Dominican Rite) of the Perpetual Rosary co-foundress, Mother Rose of Saint Mary Werhle, O.P.

Based on the appeals made by the Blessed Virgin Mary in Cova da Iria, on 16 June 1954 was also founded the Monastery Pius XII in Fátima, Portugal.
