= Wax Museum of Lourdes =

Wax museum in Lourdes, France

Coordinates: 43°5′44.195″N 0°3′4.069″W

- Musée de Cire de Lourdes
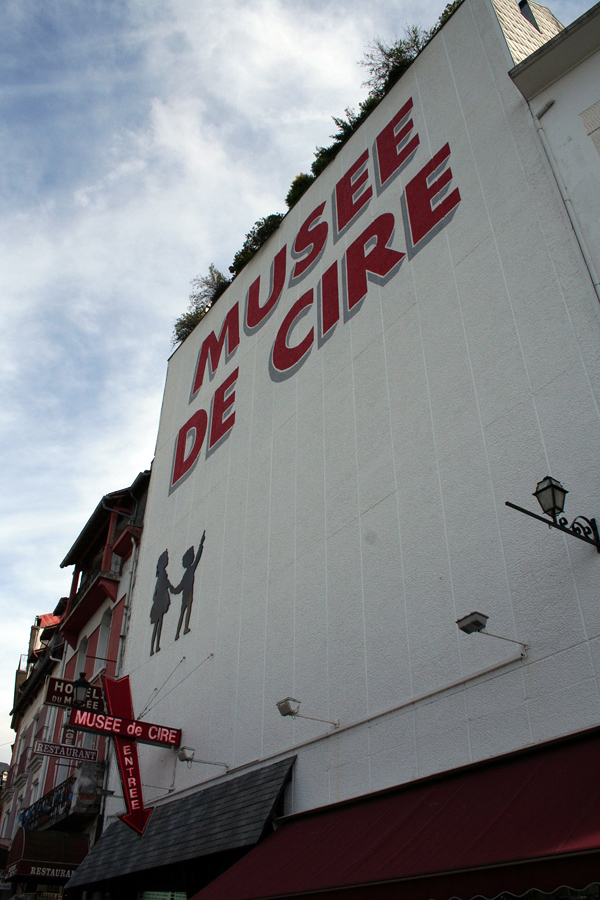
- Facade of the Wax Museum of Lourdes
- Location: Lourdes, France
- Website: musee-de-cire-lourdes.fr

The Wax Museum of Lourdes (French: Musée de Cire de Lourdes) is a wax museum located in the city of Lourdes, France. Located near the Sanctuary of Our Lady of Lourdes, it is a themed museum about the Marian apparitions reported by Bernadette Soubirous in 1858.

The Wax Museum of Lourdes includes scenes of Christ with his apostles; the apparitions of the Virgin Mary to Saint Bernadette, and other life-size realistic figures of ancient times, all modeled by the experts of the Musée Grévin in Paris. The museum is one of the main tourist attractions in Lourdes and has received more than 2,000,000 visitors since its creation.

== See also ==
- Life of Christ Museum
- Wax Museum of Fátima
