= Wax Museum of Fátima =

Wax museum in Fatima, Portugal

Coordinates: 39°37′55.243″N 8°40′38.47″W

Wax Museum of Fatima
- Museu de Cera de Fátima
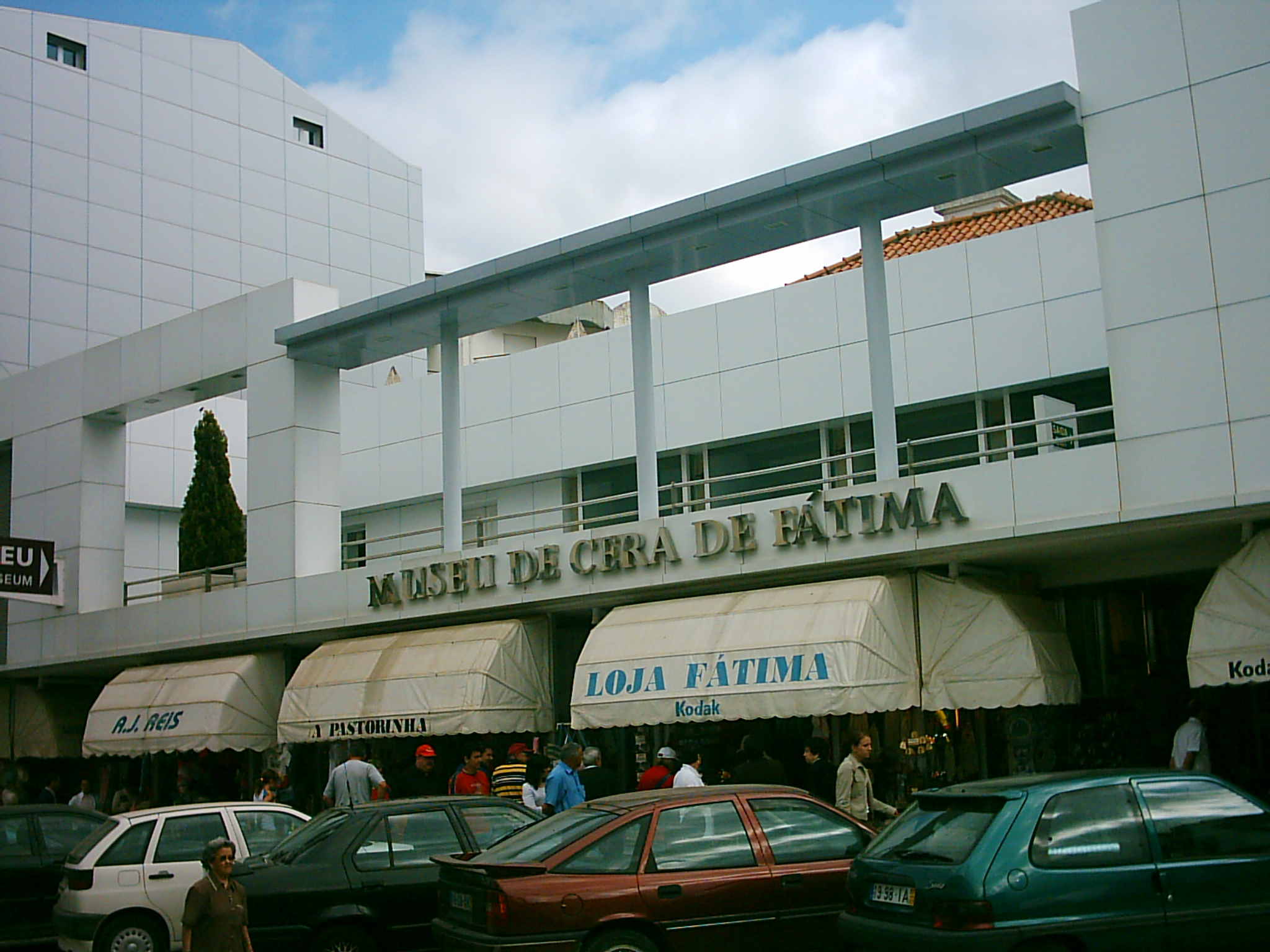
- Facade of the Wax Museum of Fatima
- Location: Cova da Iria, Fátima, Portugal
- Website: www.mucefa.pt

The Wax Museum of Fatima (Portuguese: Museu de Cera de Fátima) is a wax museum located in the city of Fatima, Portugal.

Located in Cova da Iria, near to the Sanctuary of Our Lady of Fatima, it is a themed museum about Marian apparitions reported by three shepherd children in Fatima in 1917.

== See also ==
- Life of Christ Museum
- Wax Museum of Lourdes
