= Life of Christ Museum =

Wax museum in Fatima, Portugal

Coordinates: 39°37′42.1″N 8°40′06.0″W

- Museu Vida de Cristo
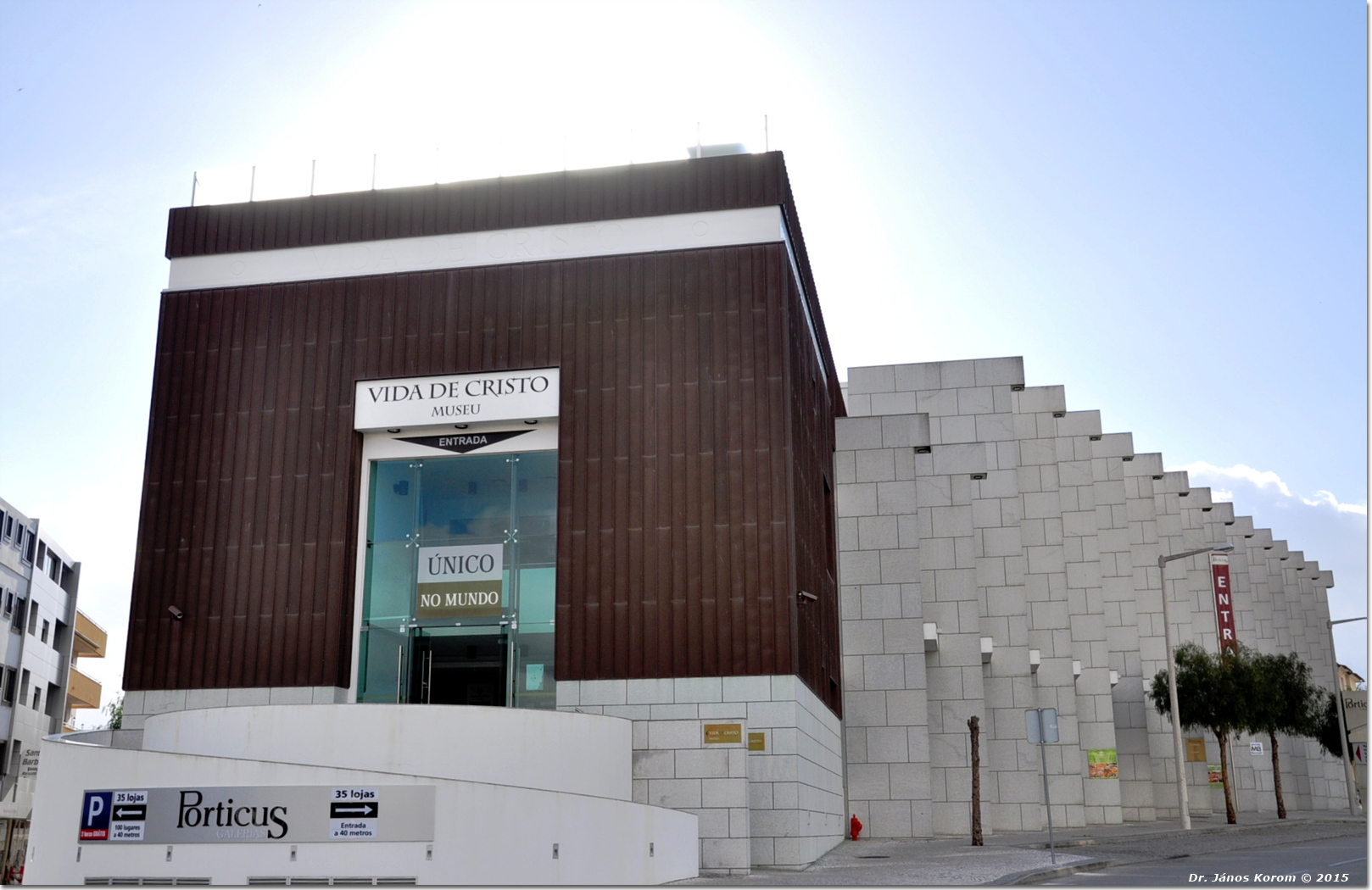
- Facade of the Life of Christ Museum in Fátima
- Established: 13 April 2007 (19 years ago)
- Location: Cova da Iria, Fátima, Portugal
- Website: www.museuvidadecristo.pt

The Life of Christ Museum (Portuguese: Museu Vida de Cristo) is a wax museum located in the city of Fátima, Portugal.

Located in Cova da Iria, near to the Sanctuary of Our Lady of Fátima, it is a themed museum about the life of Jesus Christ, considered unique in the world.

== History ==
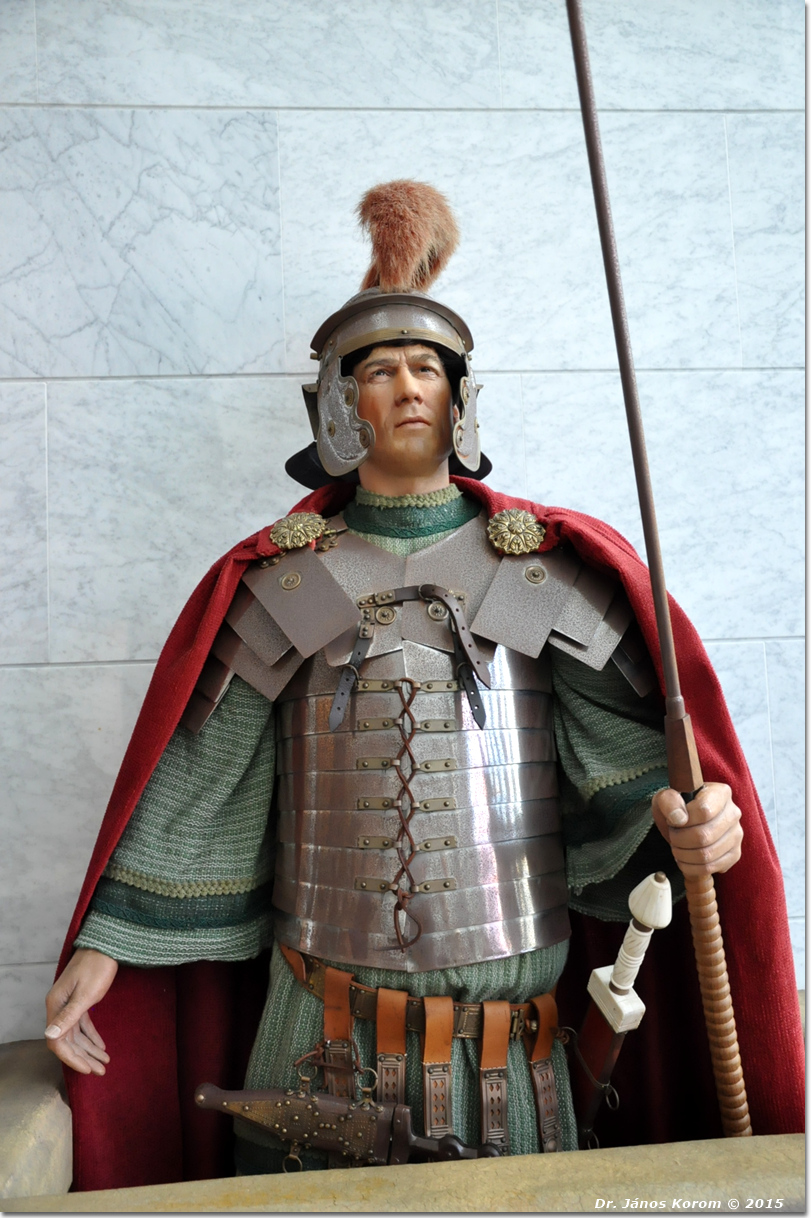
Wax sculpture of a Roman centurion at the entrance of the museum

Opened on 13 April 2007, the Life of Christ Museum is a museum complex where the life of Jesus is portrayed, from the Annunciation of the Angel to Mary to the Ascension of Jesus to Heaven, in a total of 33 scenes, through life-size wax figures dressed in clothes made with fabrics manufactured in the Sertã area on manual looms by Portuguese artisan women. The project involved an investment of 12 million euros.

In August 2017 it was announced that the museum would close and be liquidated, after its main creditors rejected an insolvency plan in a last attempt to keep the museum in operation. The museum had a debt of around six million euros, with the biggest creditor being Caixa Geral de Depósitos, which voted in favor of its liquidation. The insolvency sentence of the Life of Christ Museum would be handed down. Subsequently, meeting in an assembly, the creditors ordered the closure of the museum's activities.

In 2021, the Life of Christ Museum was sold for a total of 1.1 million euros with the property being acquired by Renowned Champion, a real estate company based in Lisbon. According to the acquiring company, the Life of Christ Museum was considered the third best wax museum in the world by Tony Julius, director of the London company that manufactured the wax figures and former collaborator of the Madame Tussauds Museum.

The Life of Christ Museum reopened to the public on 15 March 2024.

== Characteristics ==
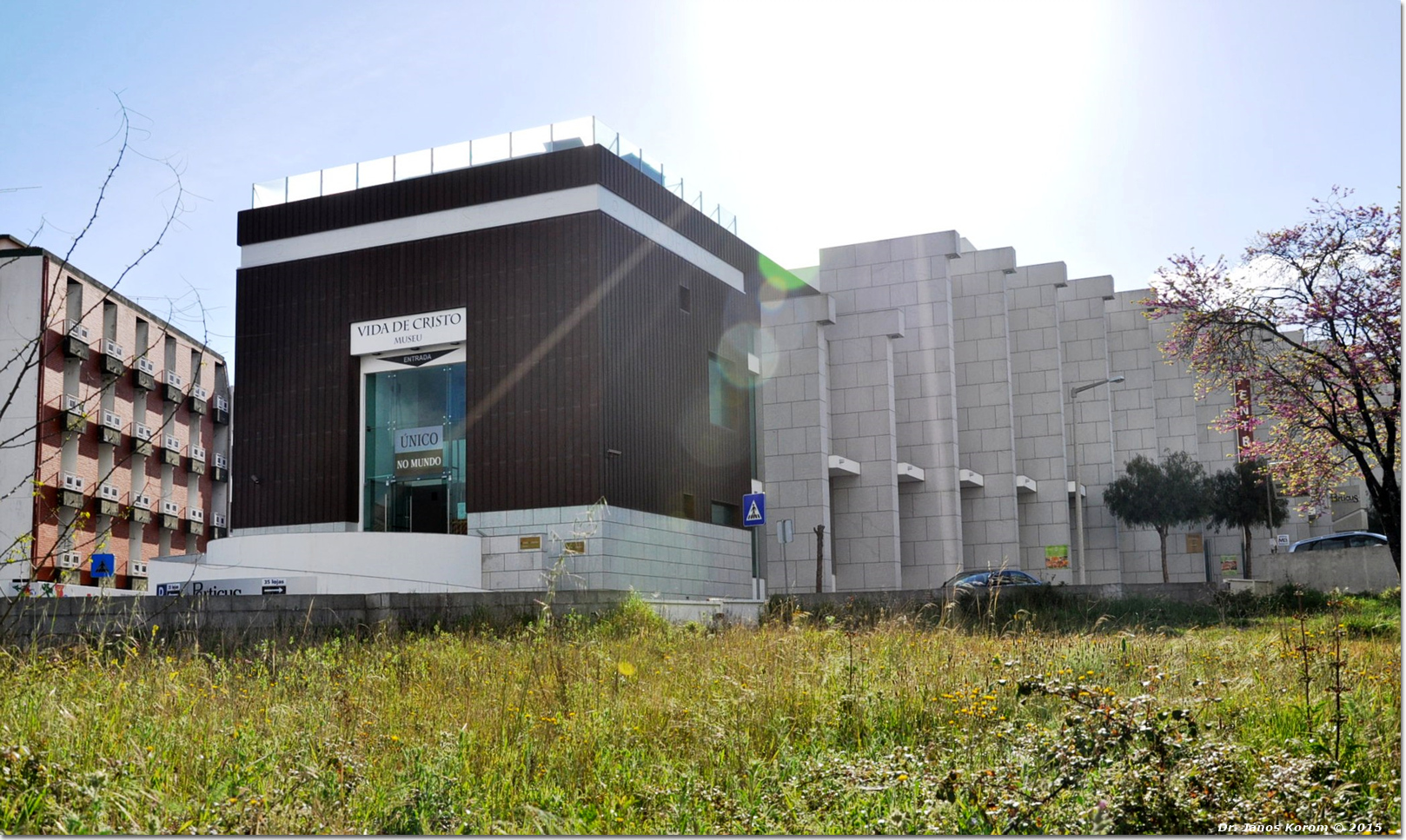
Exterior of the Life of Christ Museum in Fátima, Portugal

With an area of 4,4,400 m^{2} (47,000 sq ft), the Life of Christ Museum has 210 wax figures, distributed in 33 scenes. With modern architecture, in light colors, the exterior is clad in granite and copper. Internally, it is divided into floors with great light and ample circulation spaces:

- two floors to narrate the life of Christ;
- two floors as a complement to the commercial area;
- two floors for parking light vehicles.

The Life of Christ Museum has a shopping arcade with 16 stores, five storage rooms and a car park in the basement with around a hundred parking spaces.

== The Museum scenes ==
The following photographic gallery presents the 33 scenes from the life of Jesus represented in wax sculptures at the Life of Christ Museum:

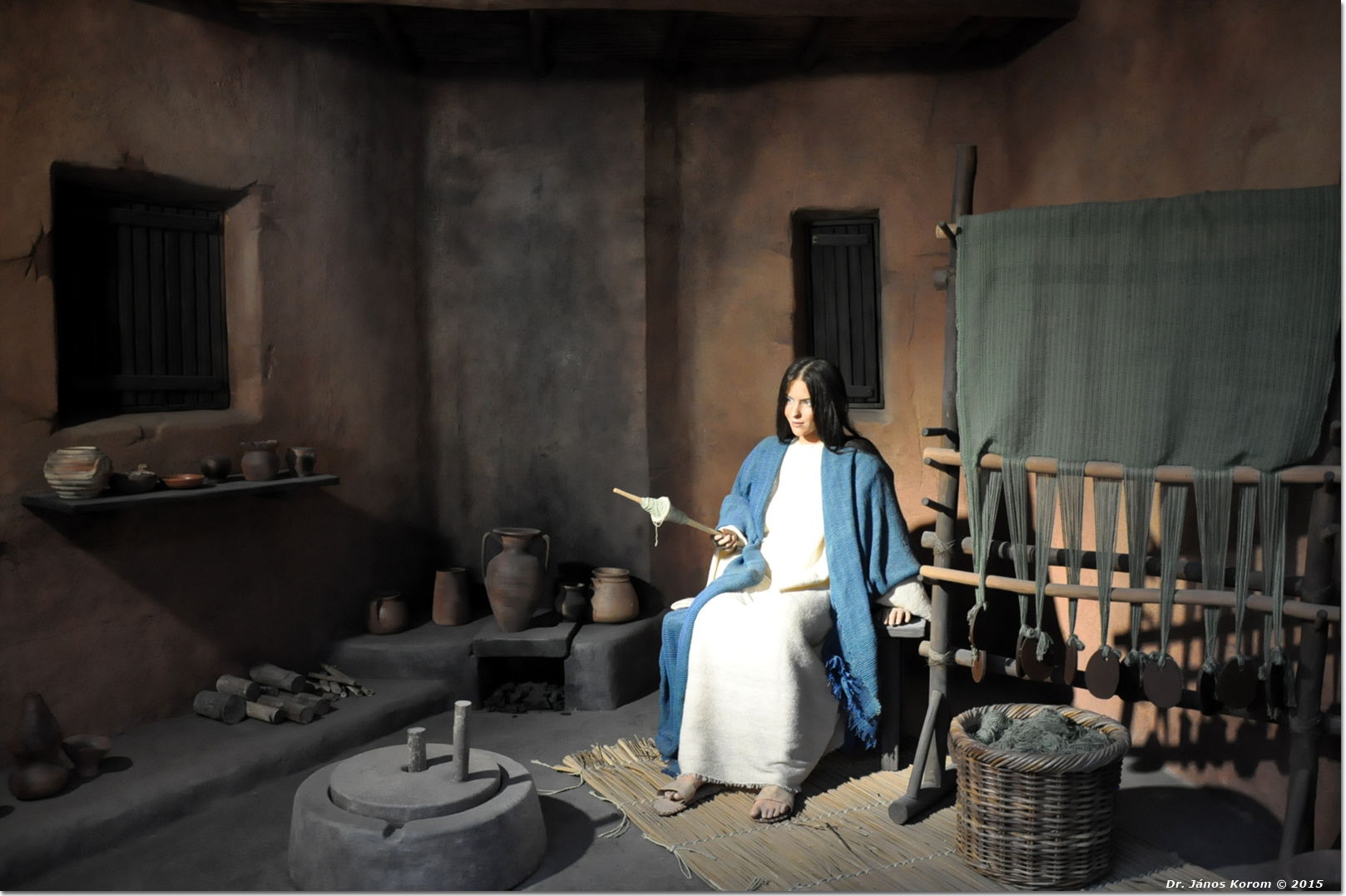
Scene 1: Annunciation by the archangel Gabriel to the Virgin Mary

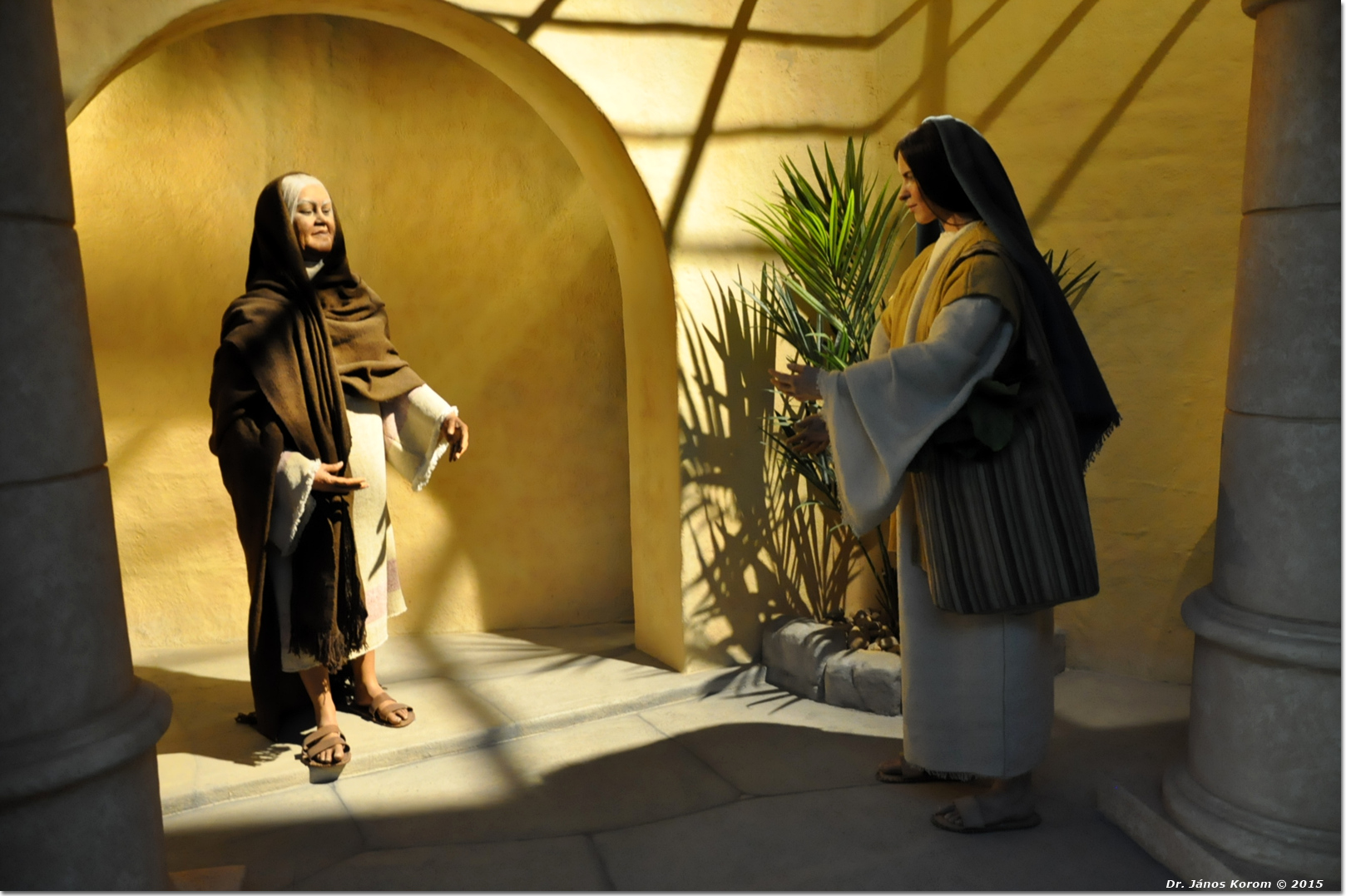
Scene 2: Visitation of the Virgin Mary to her cousin Elizabeth

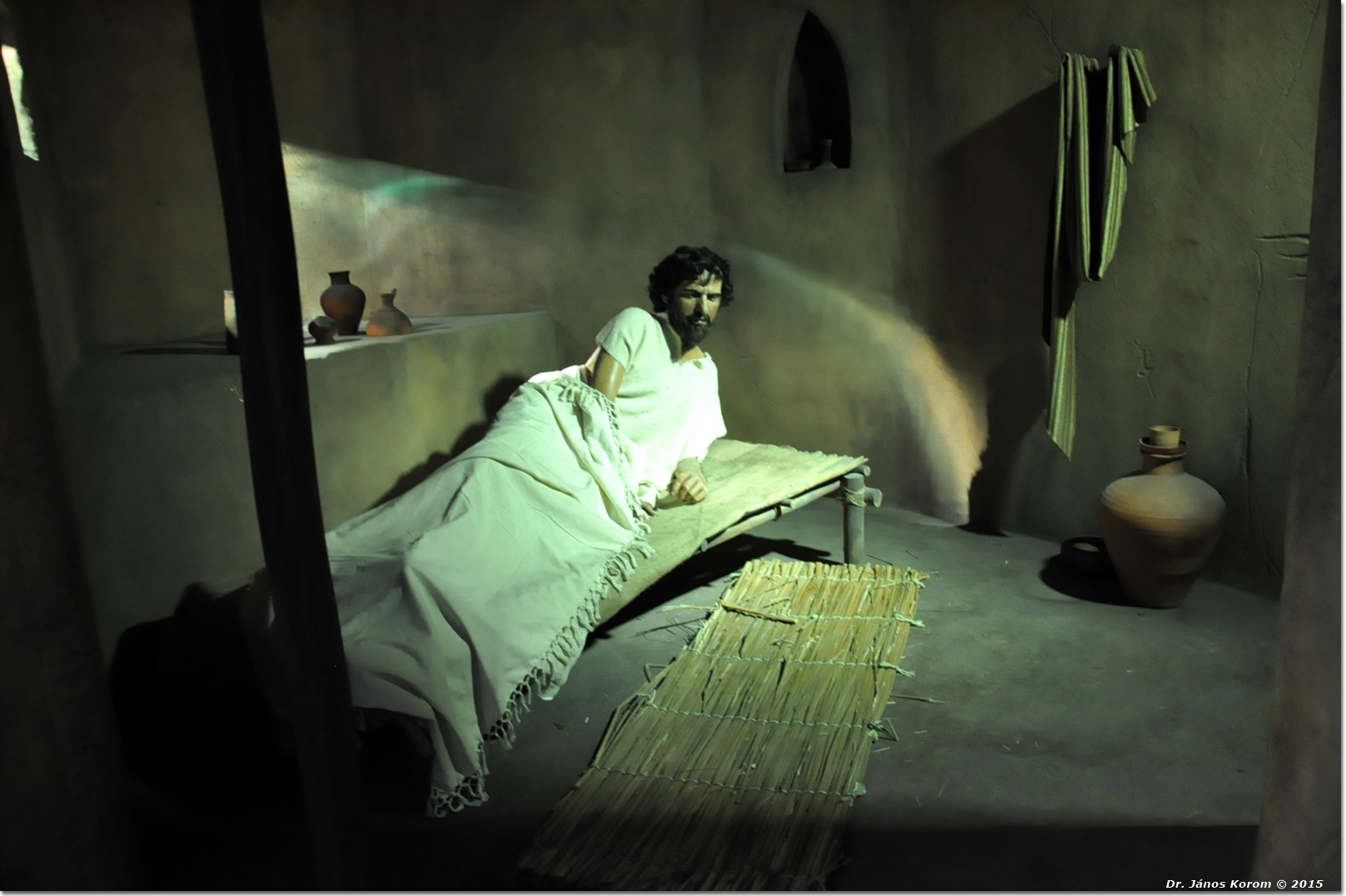
Scene 3: The annunciation to Saint Joseph

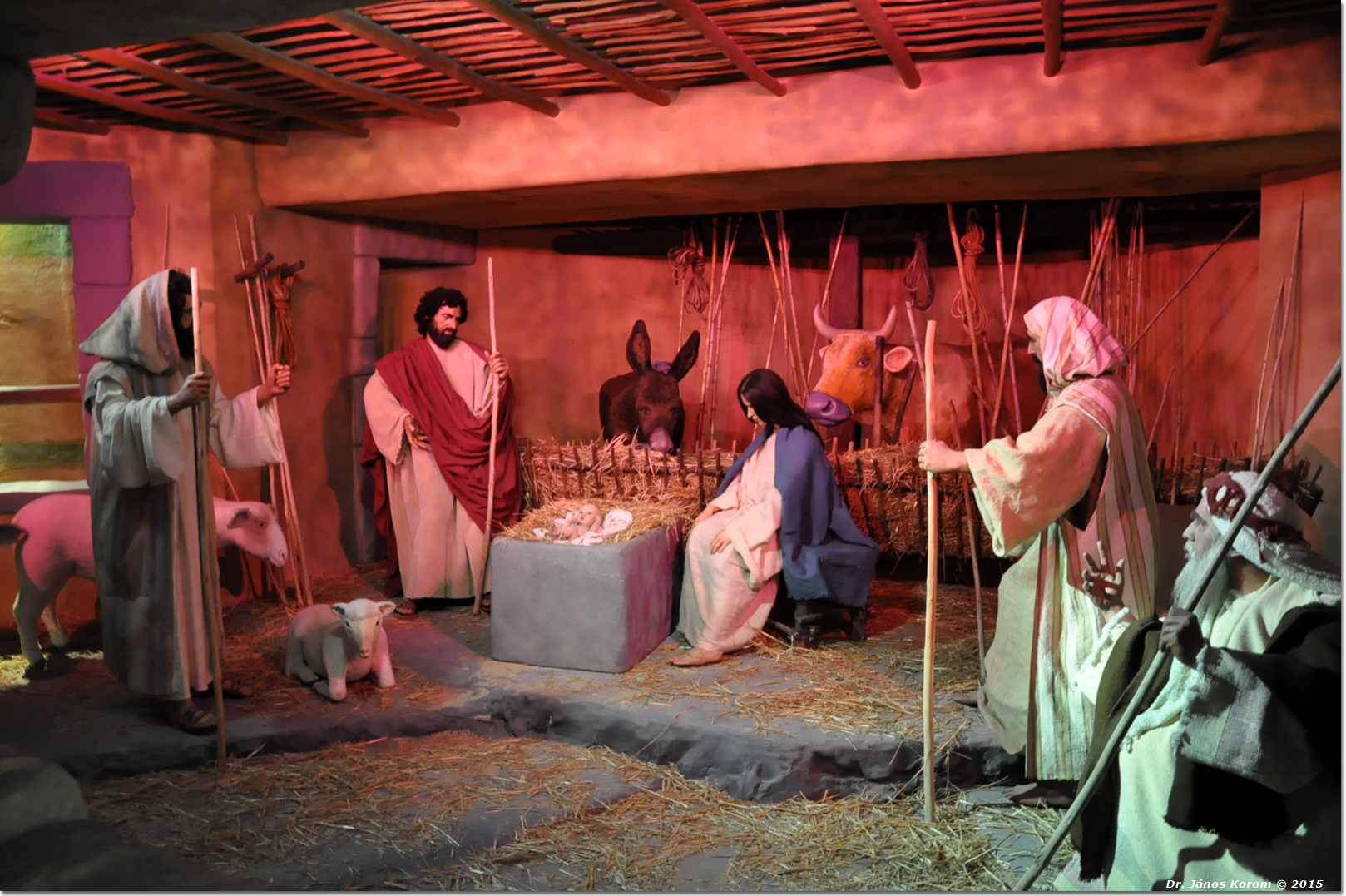
Scene 4: The nativity of Jesus

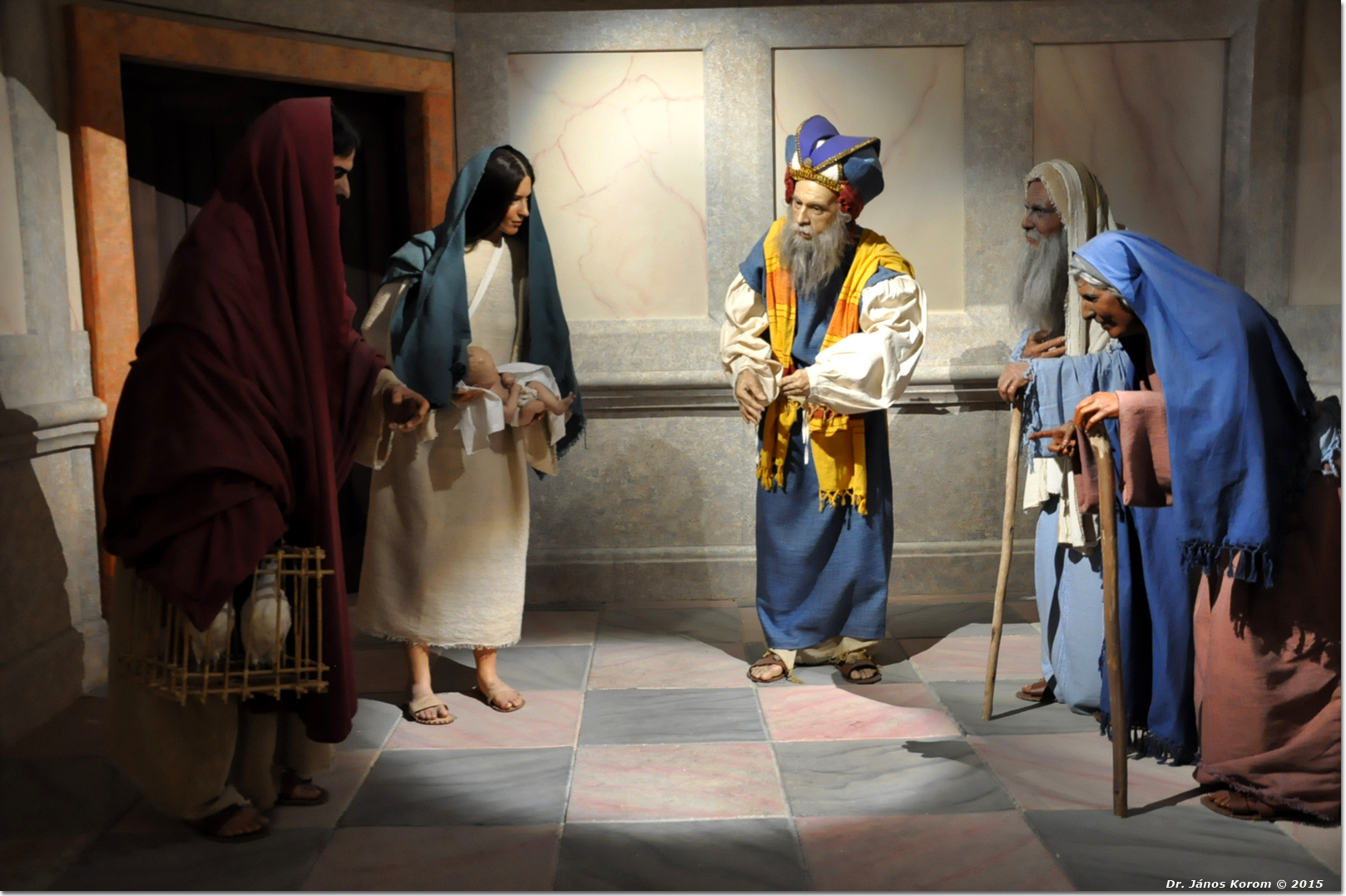
Scene 5: Presentation of the Child Jesus at the Temple in Jerusalem

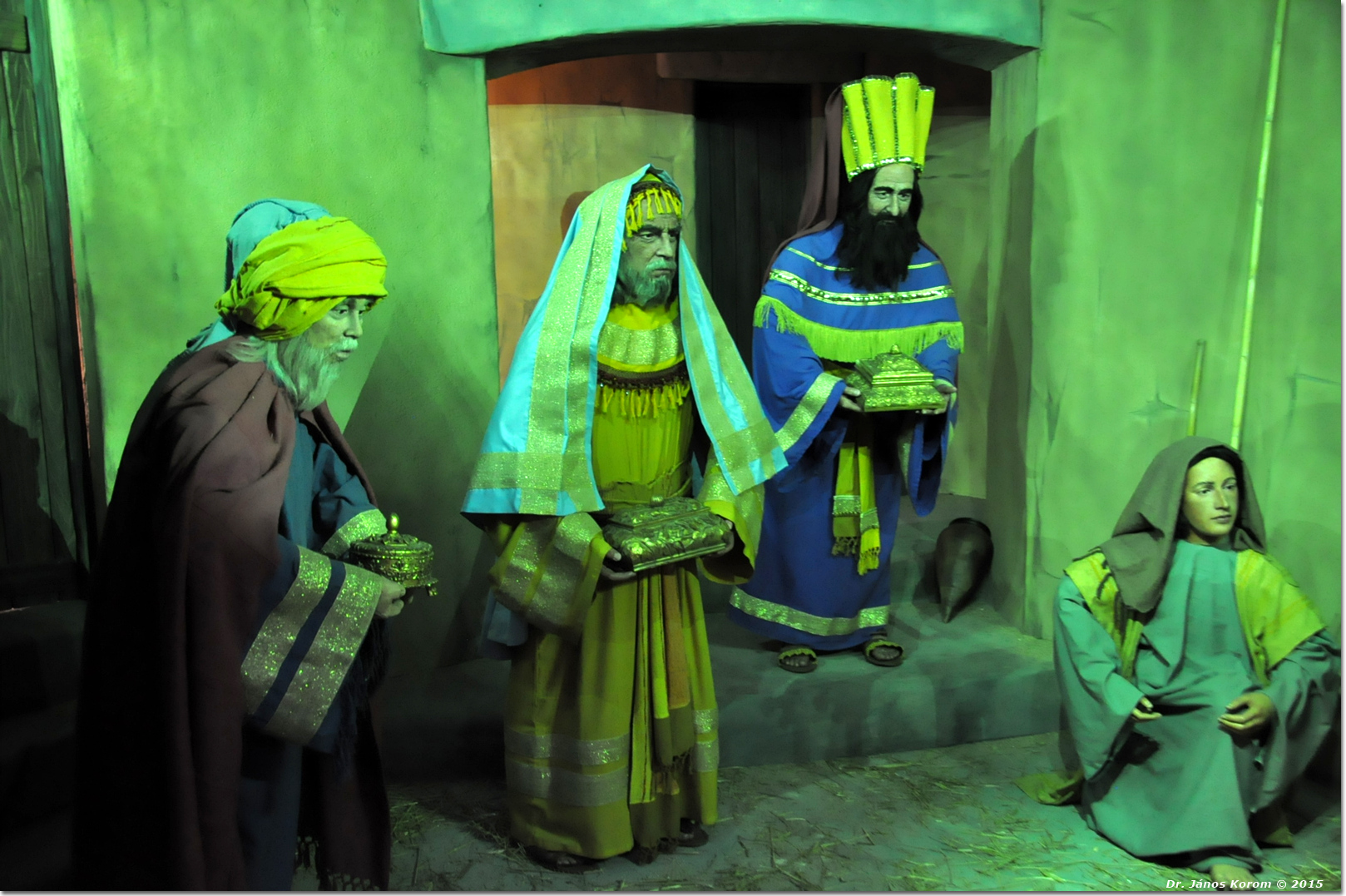
Scene 6: The visit of the Three Magi to the Christ Child

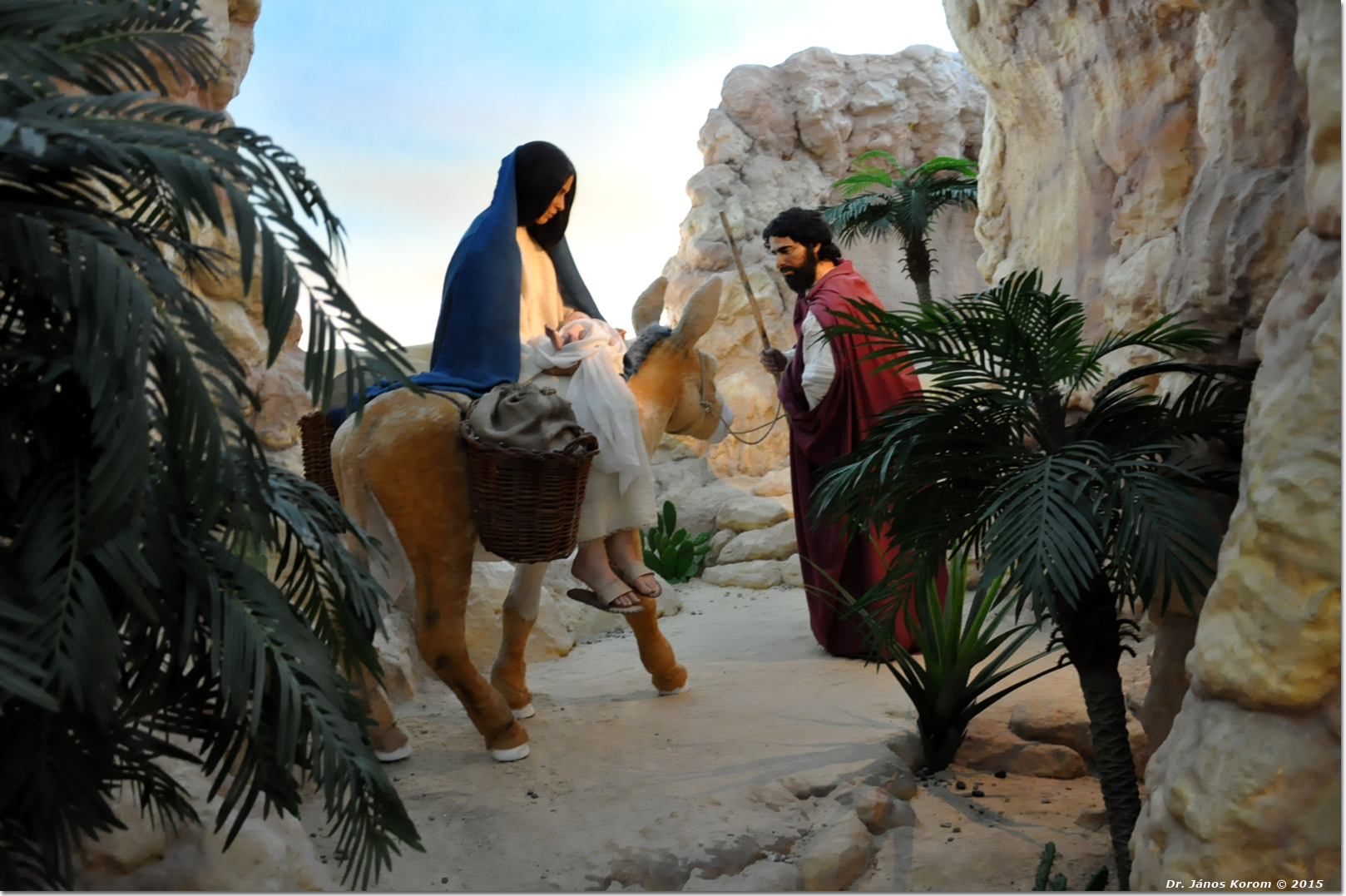
Scene 7: The flight into Egypt

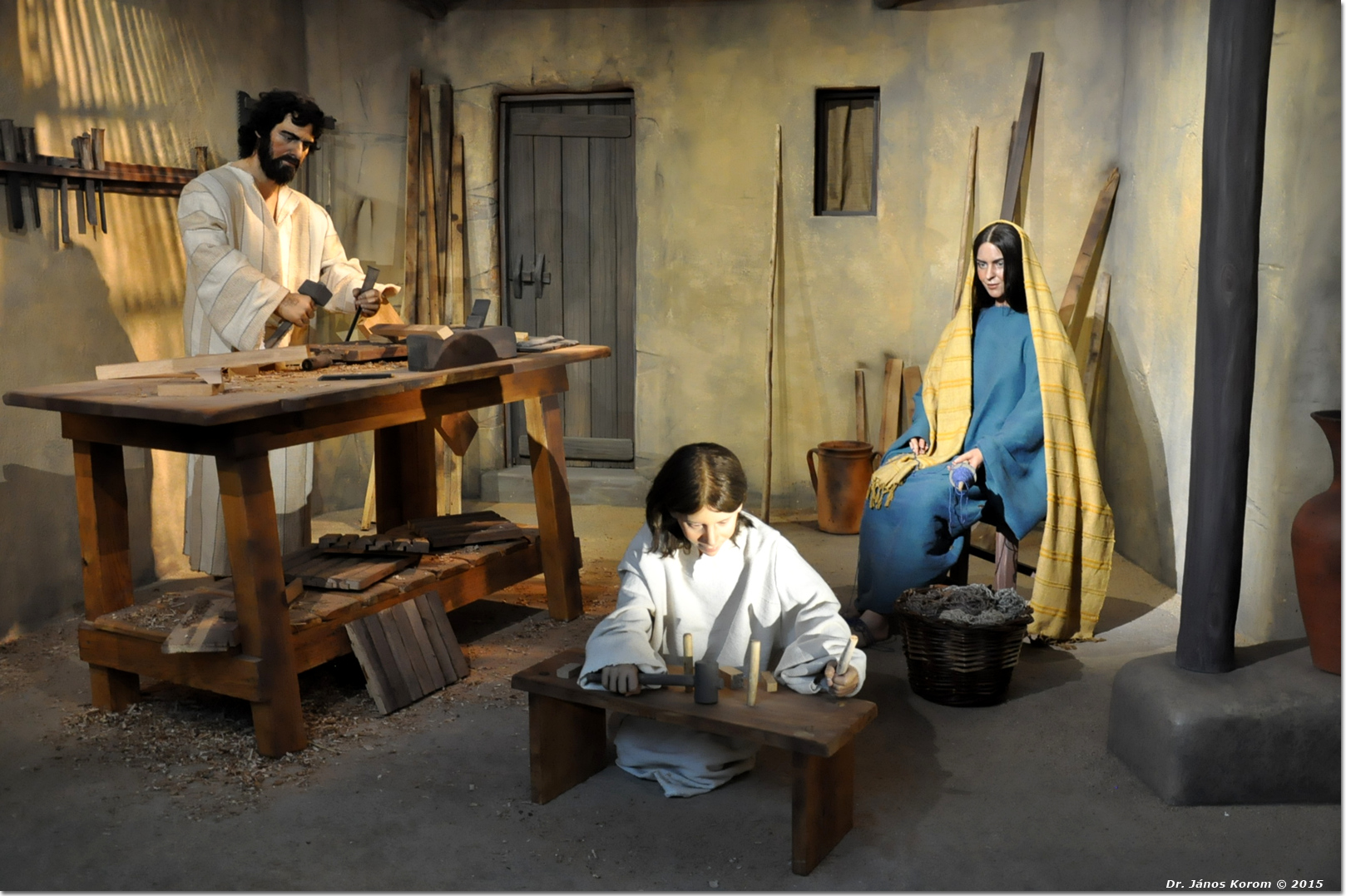
Scene 8: Jesus' childhood in Nazareth

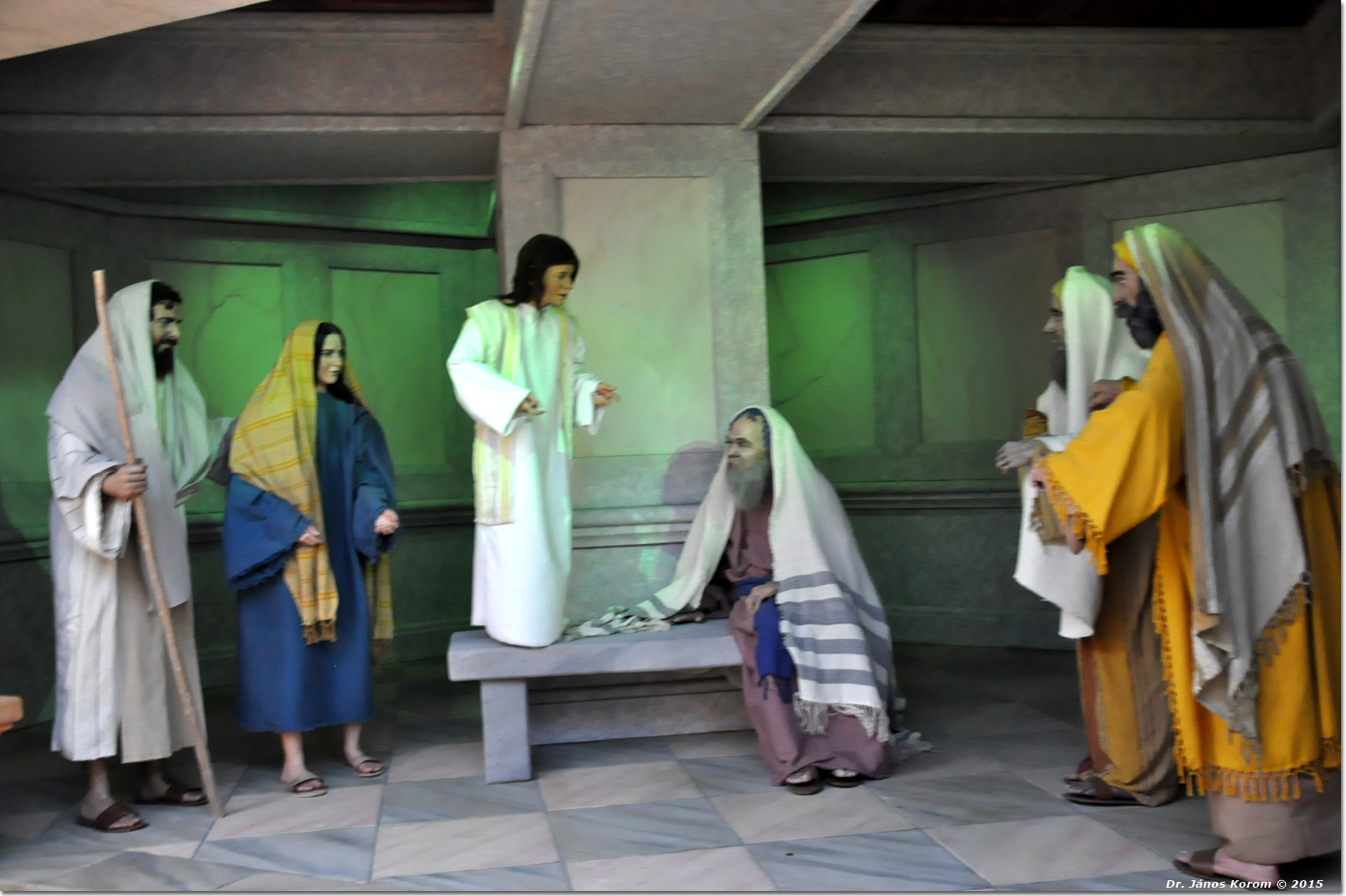
Scene 9: Jesus among the Doctors of the Temple of Jerusalem

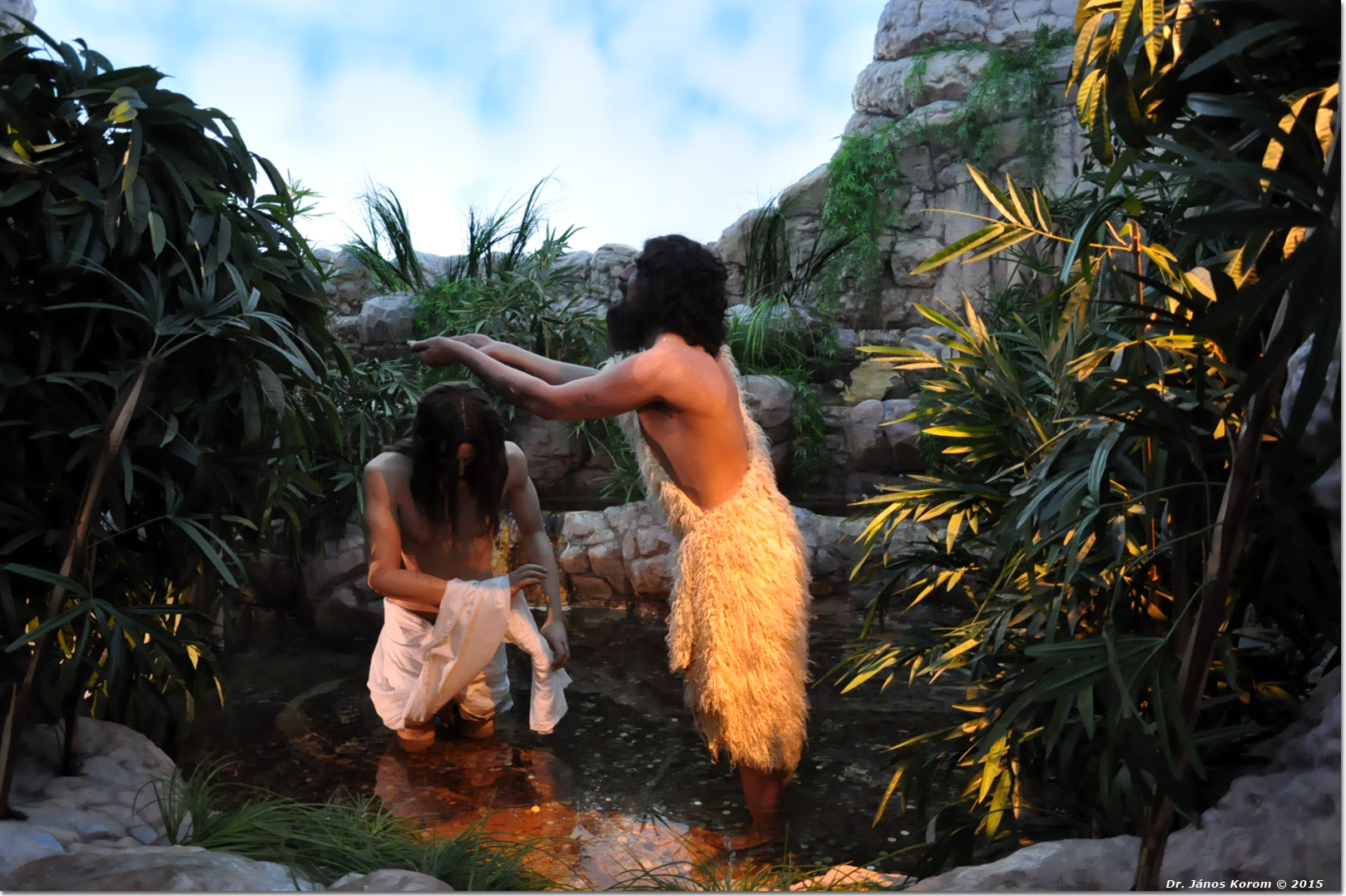
Scene 10: Saint John the Baptist and the baptism of Jesus in the Jordan River

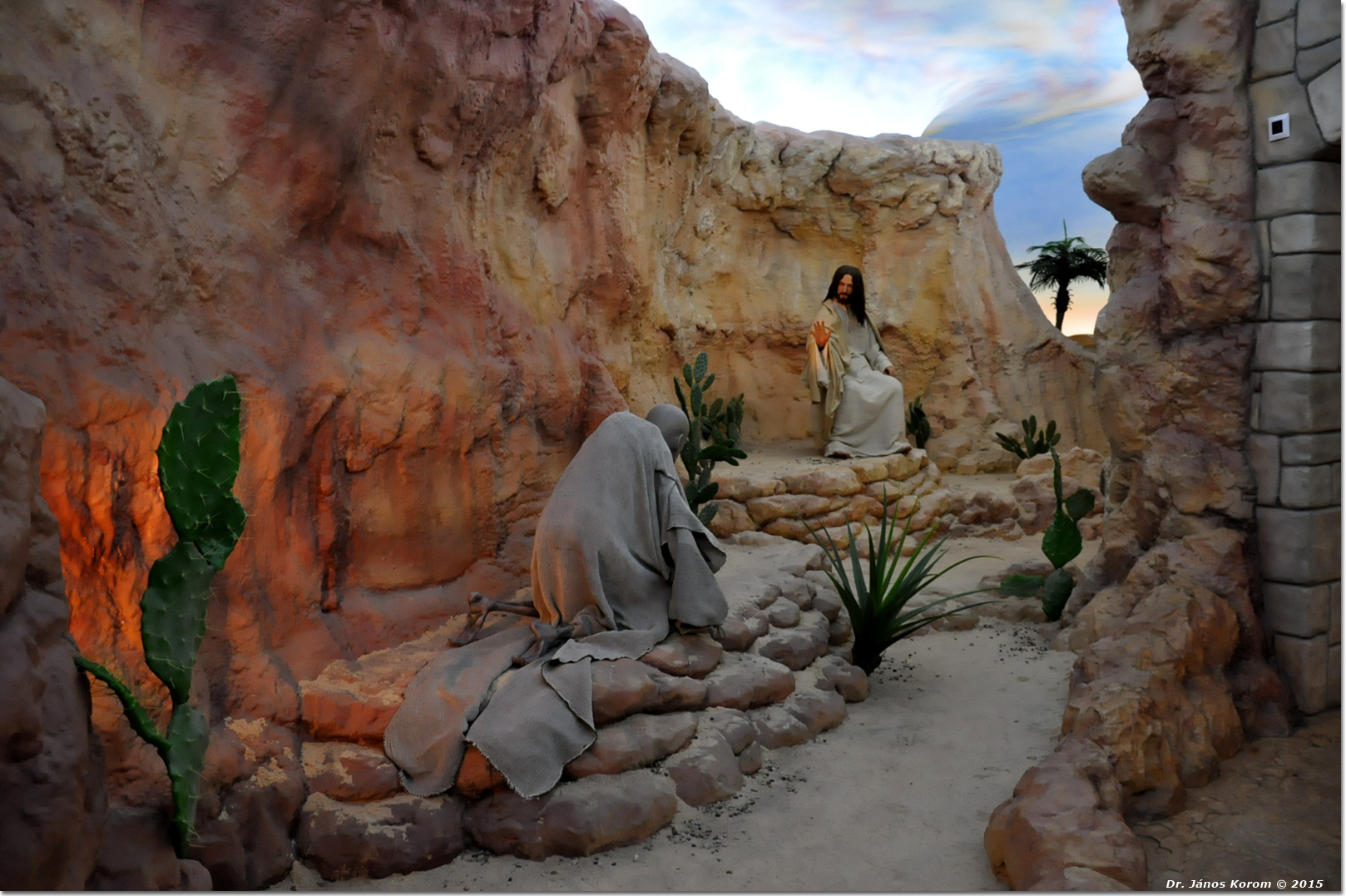
Scene 11: The temptation of Christ in the Judaean Desert

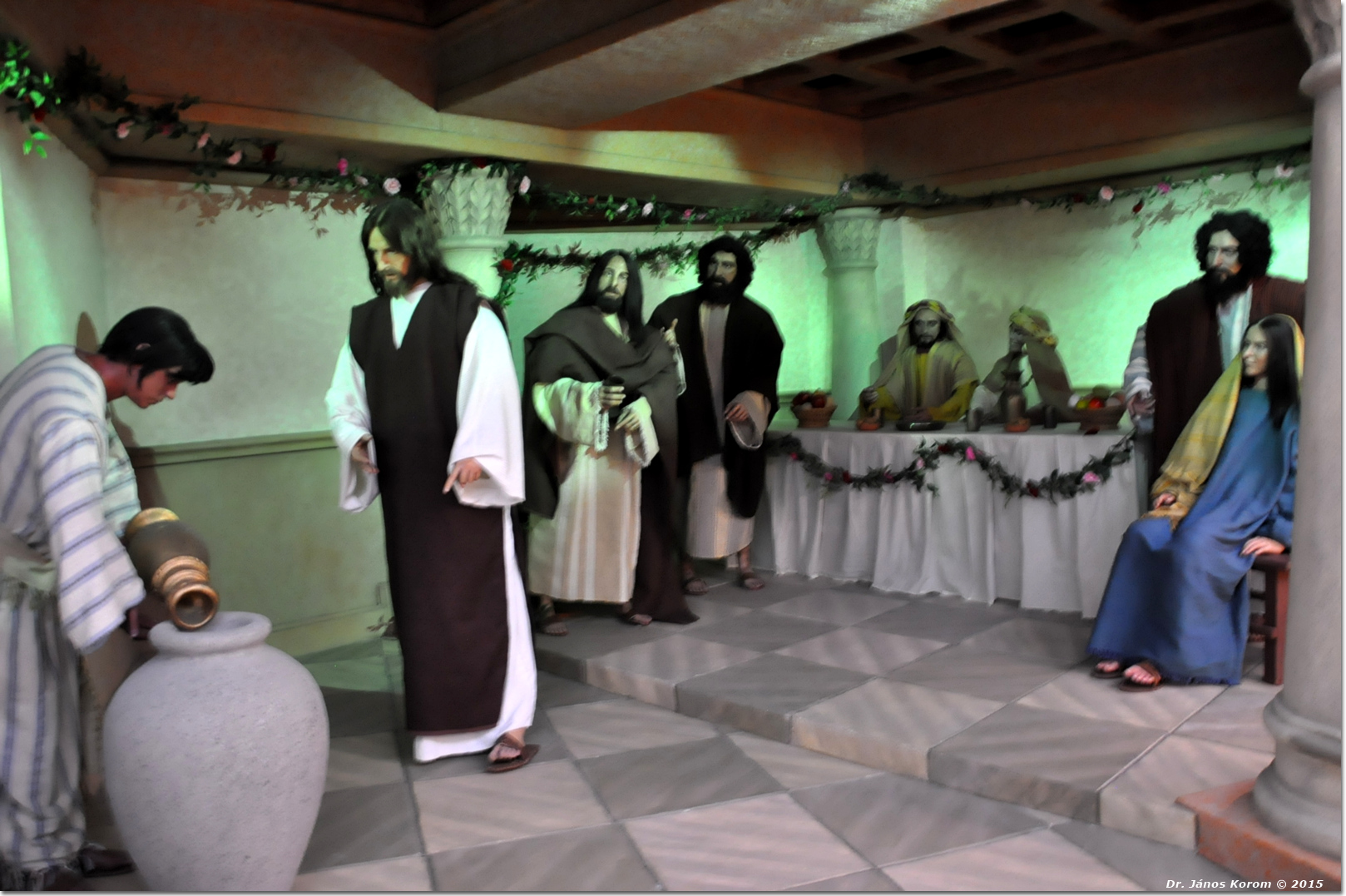
Scene 12: The transformation of water into wine at the Wedding at Cana

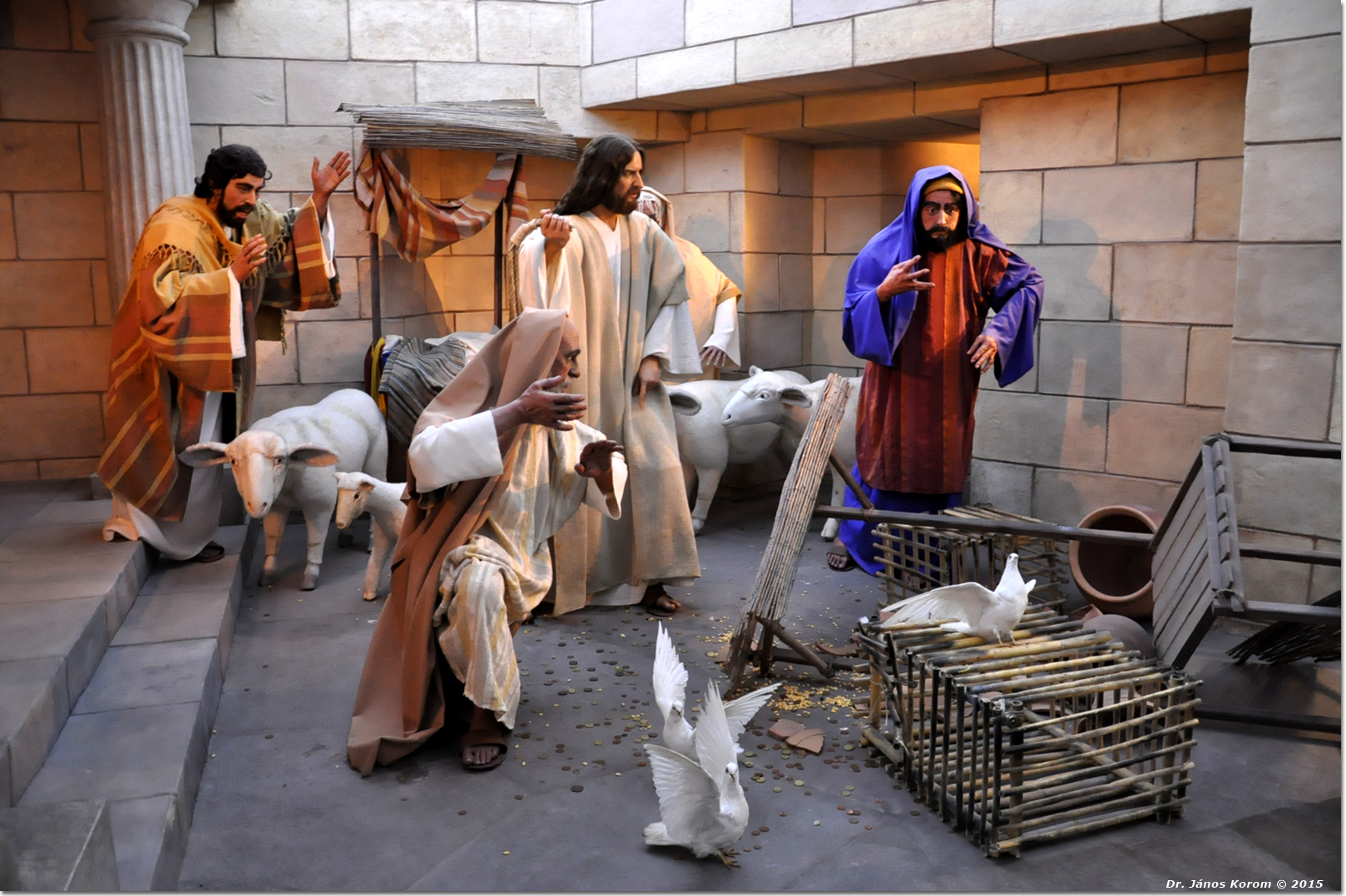
Scene 13: Jesus expelling the merchants and the money changers from the Temple

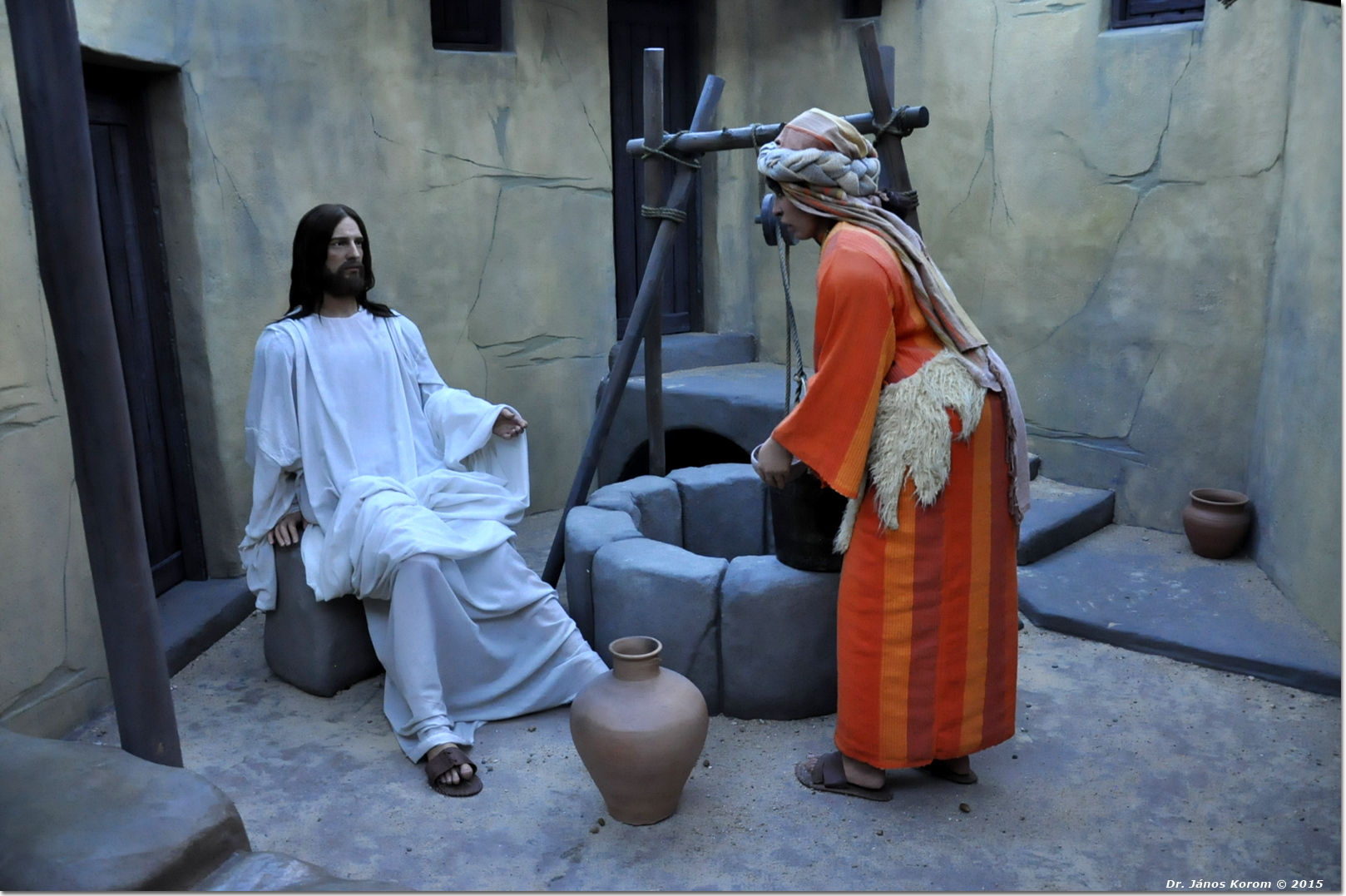
Scene 14: Jesus and the Samaritan woman at the well

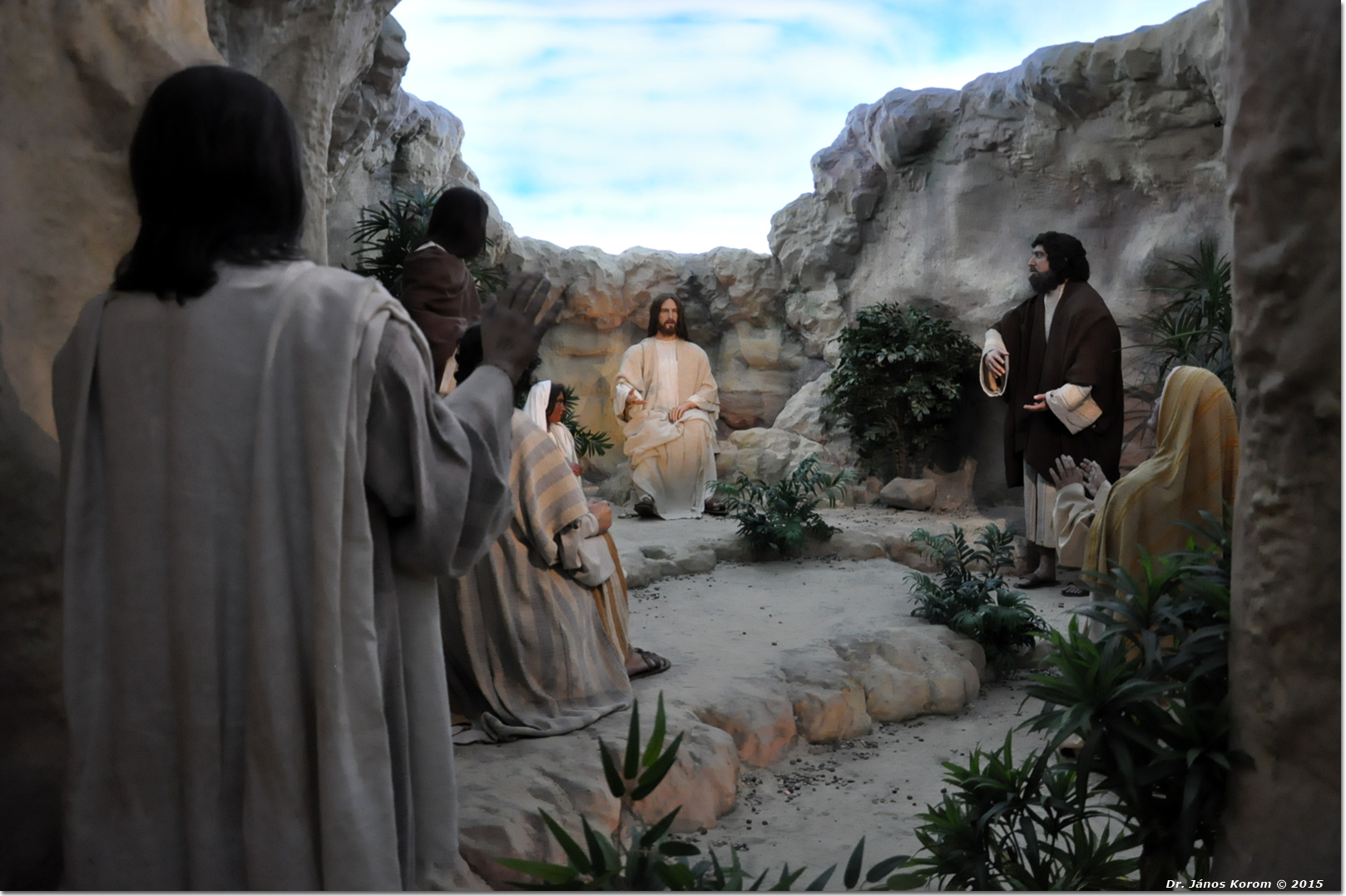
Scene 15: Sermon on the Mount

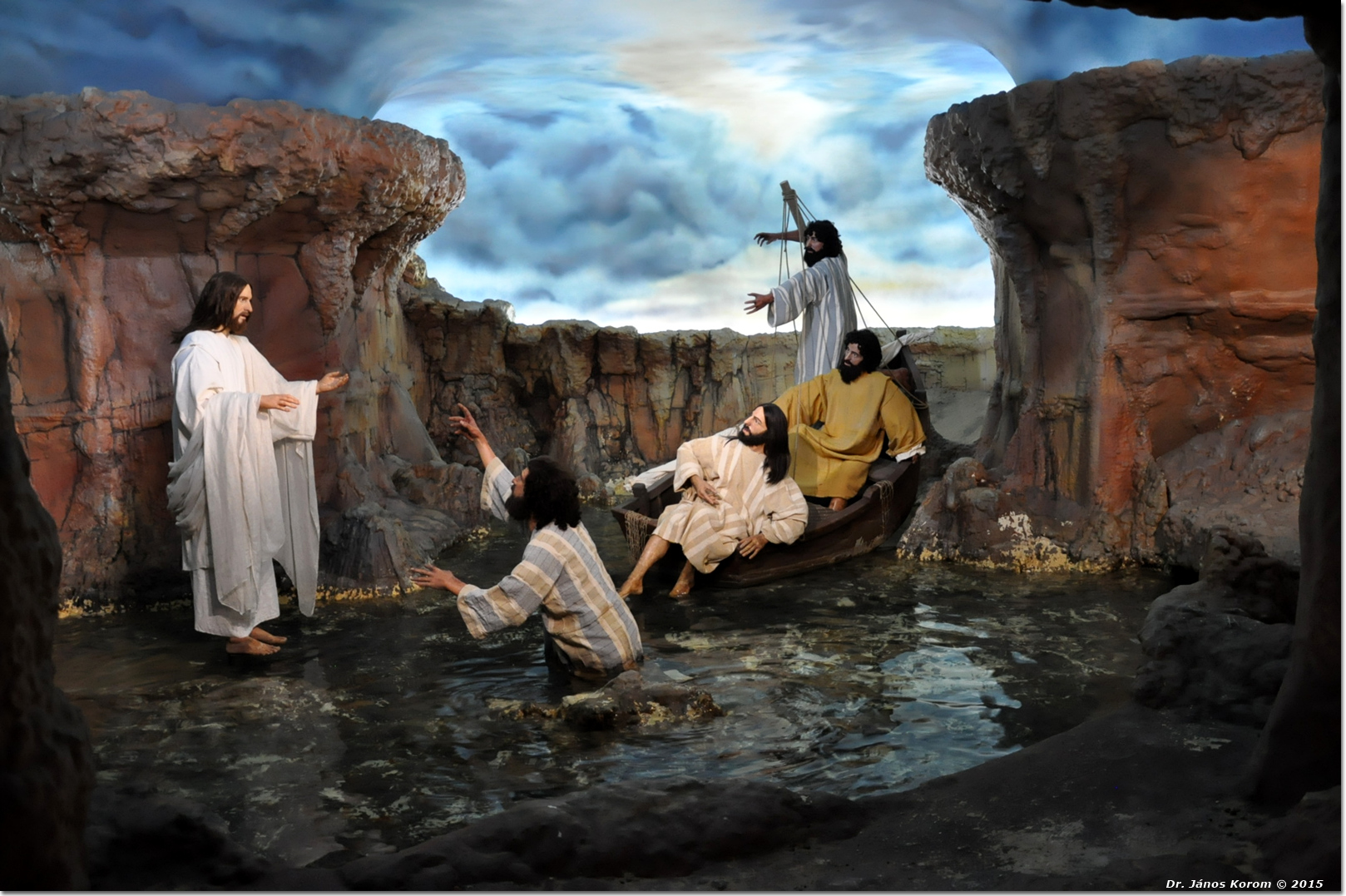
Scene 16: Jesus walking on water of the Sea of Galilee

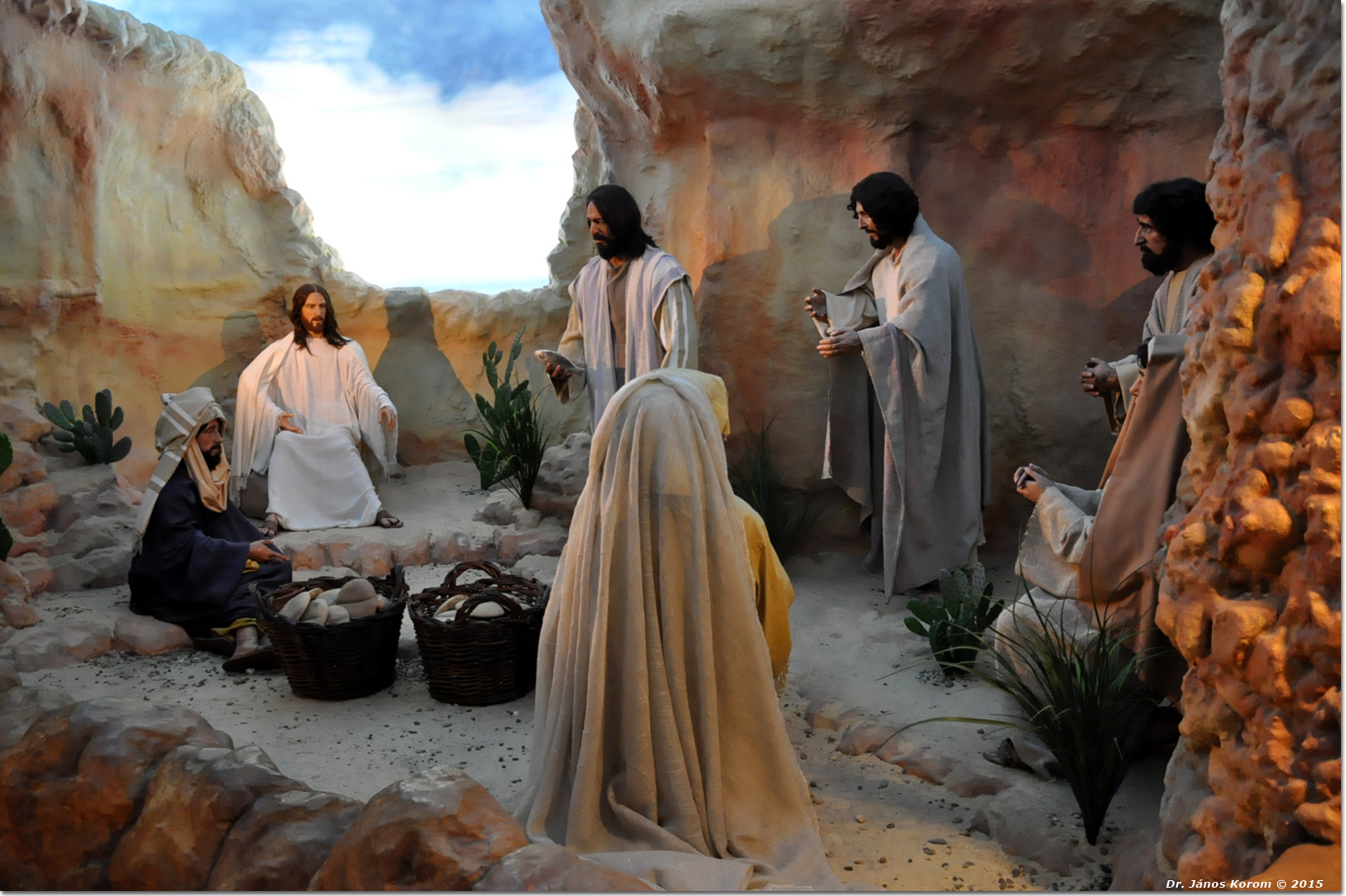
Scene 17: Multiplication of the loaves and fishes

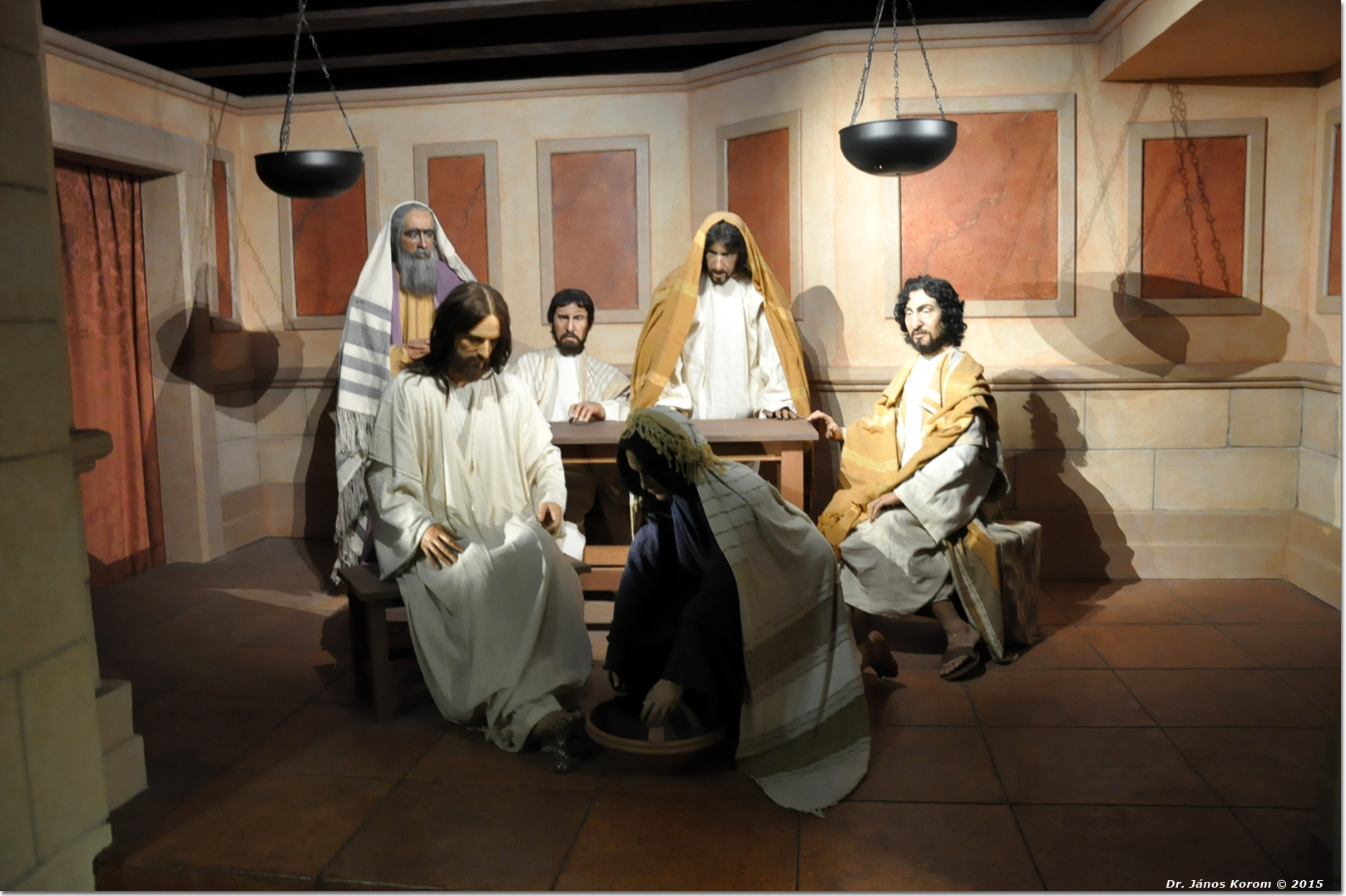
Scene 18: Mary Magdalene, the repentant sinner

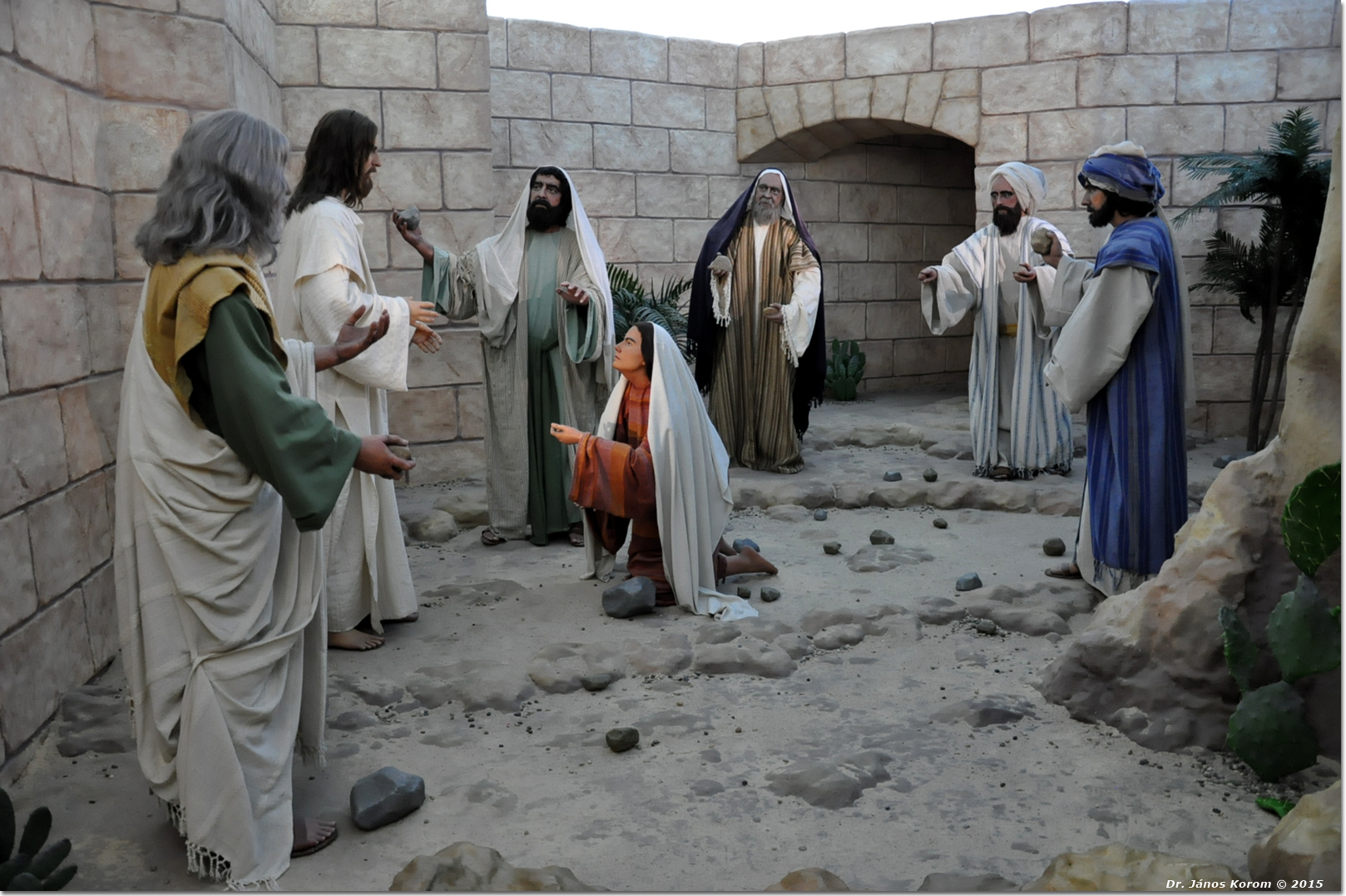
Scene 19: Jesus and the woman taken in adultery

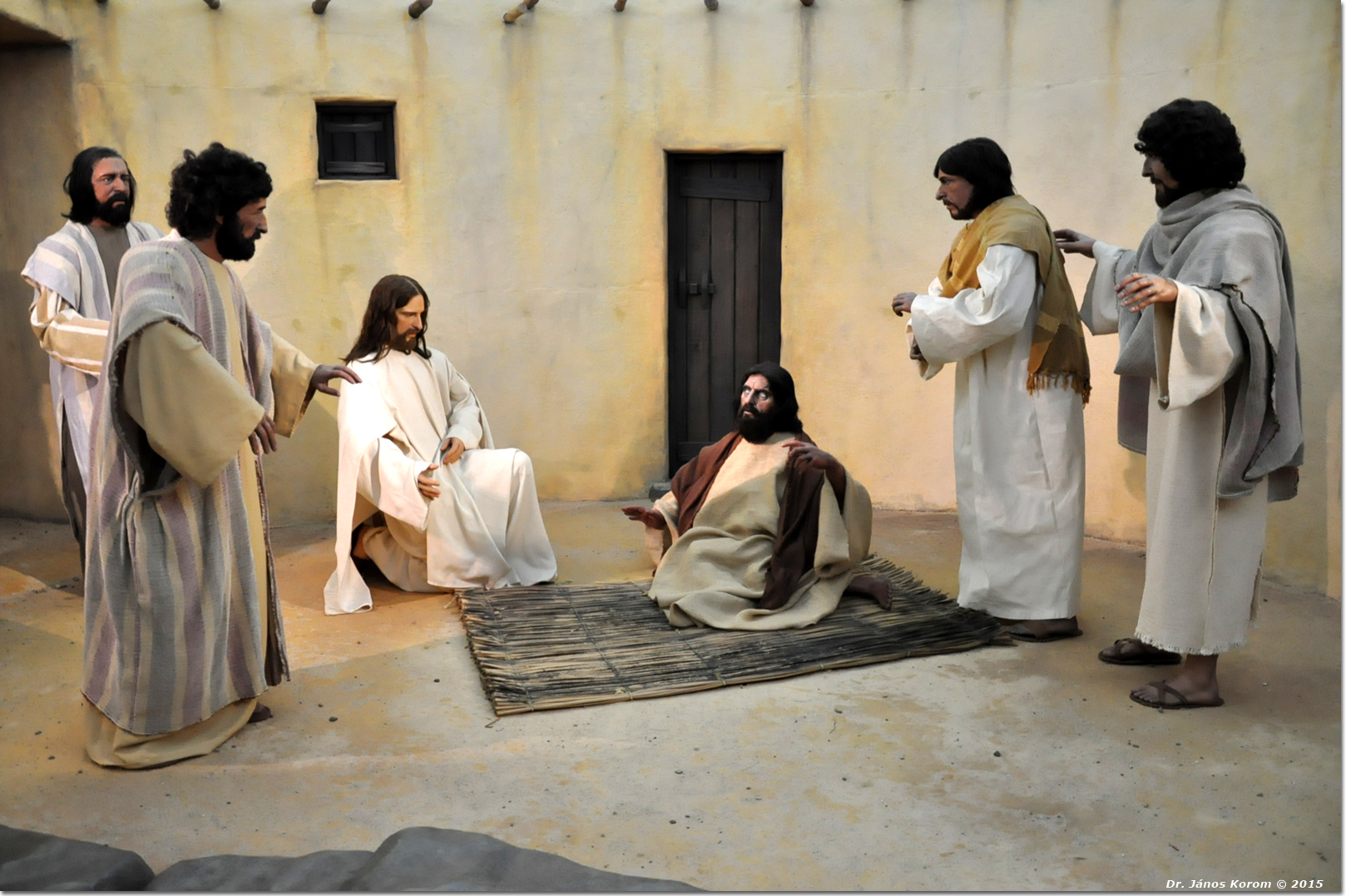
Scene 20: Jesus healing the man blind from birth

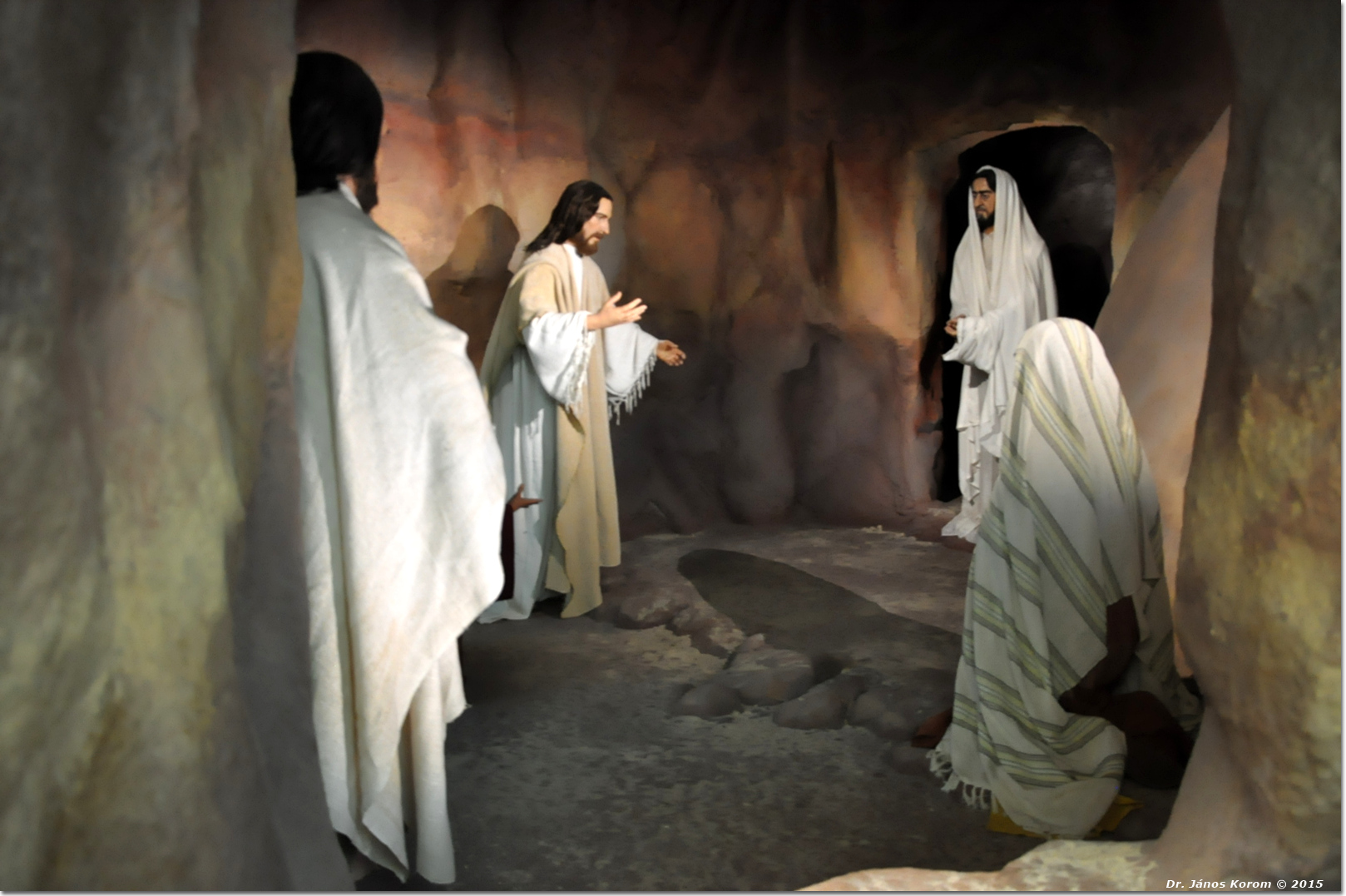
Scene 21: The raising of Lazarus

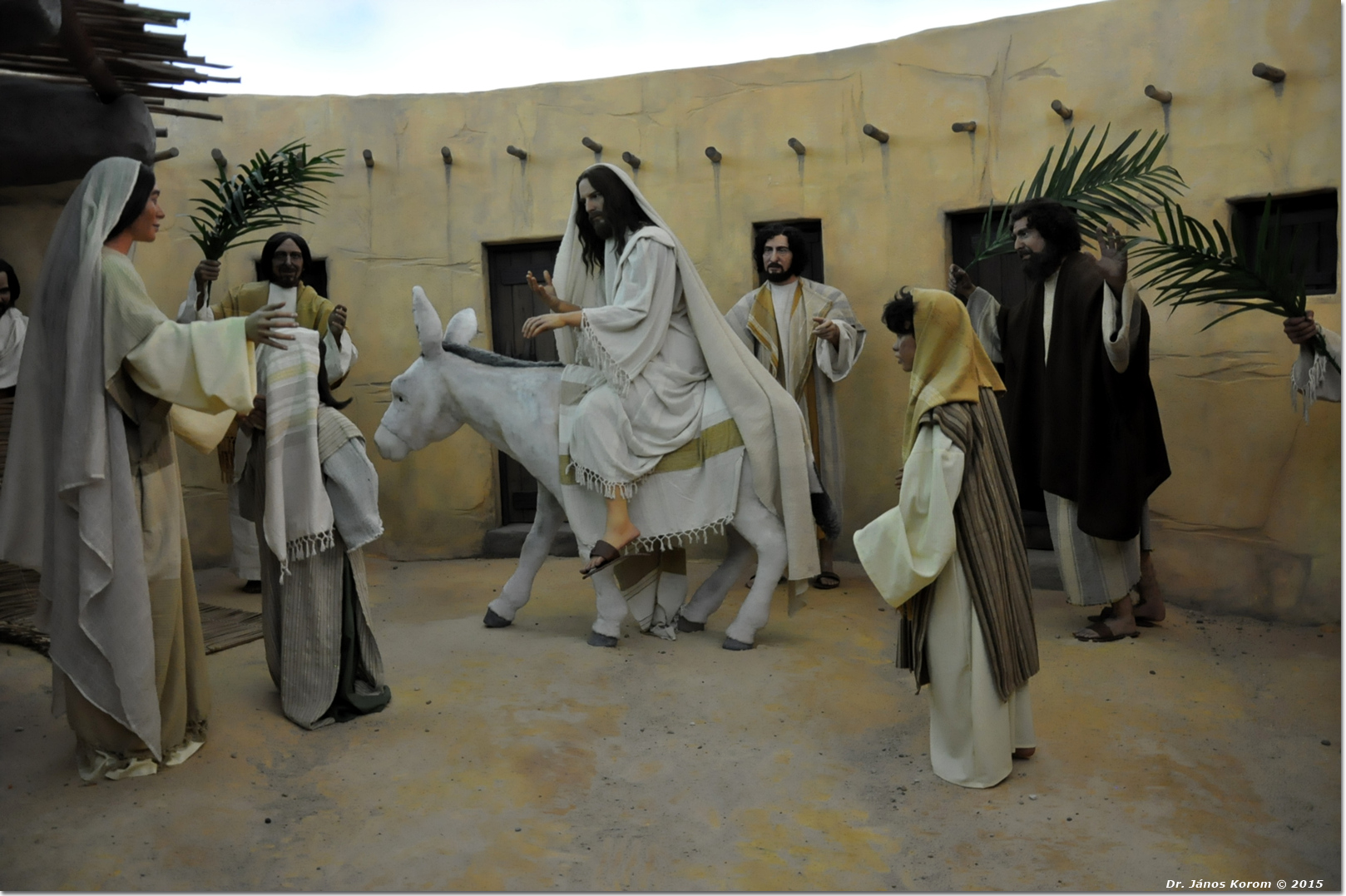
Scene 22: Jesus' triumphal entry into Jerusalem

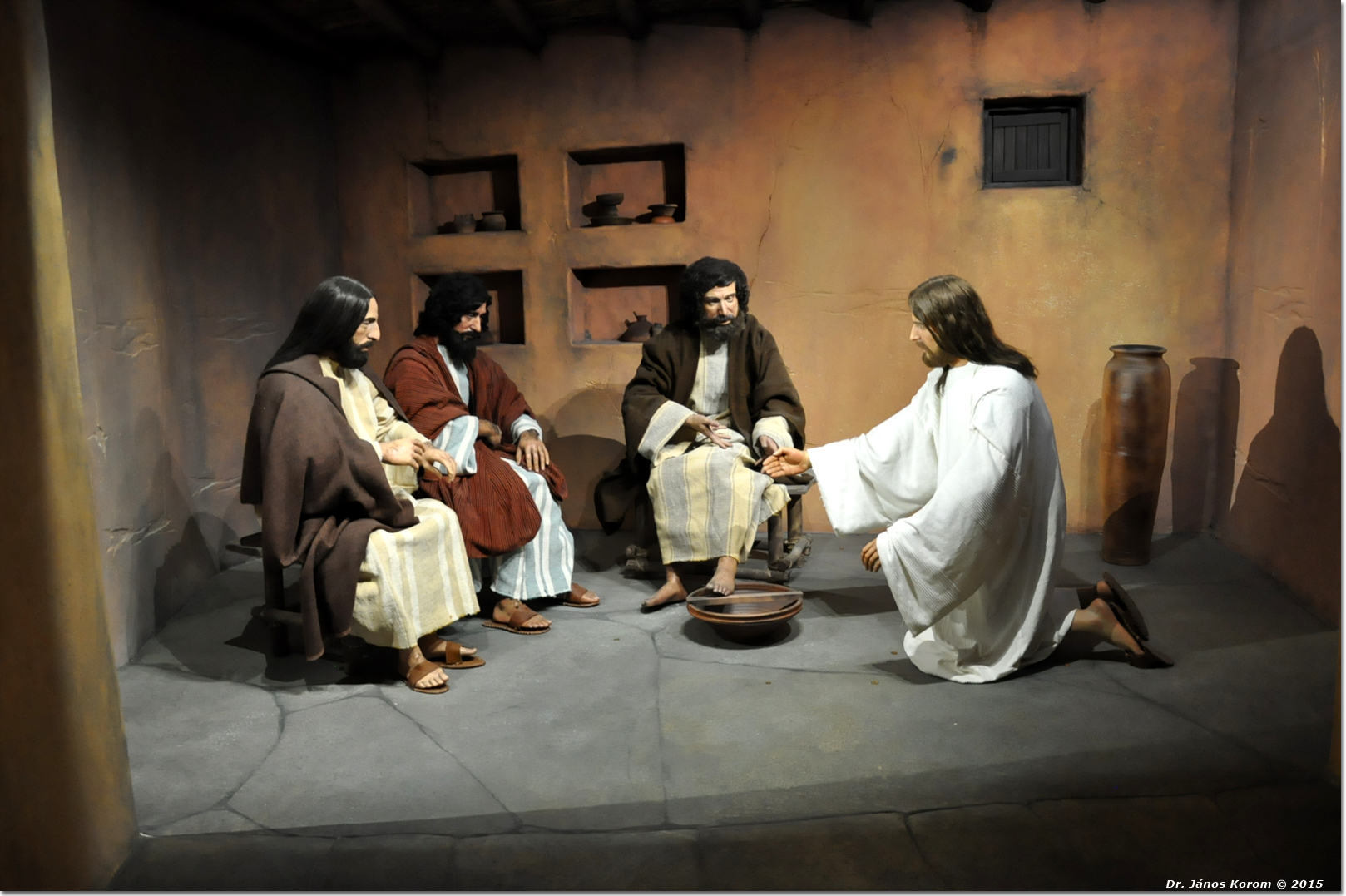
Scene 23: Jesus washing the feet of the disciples

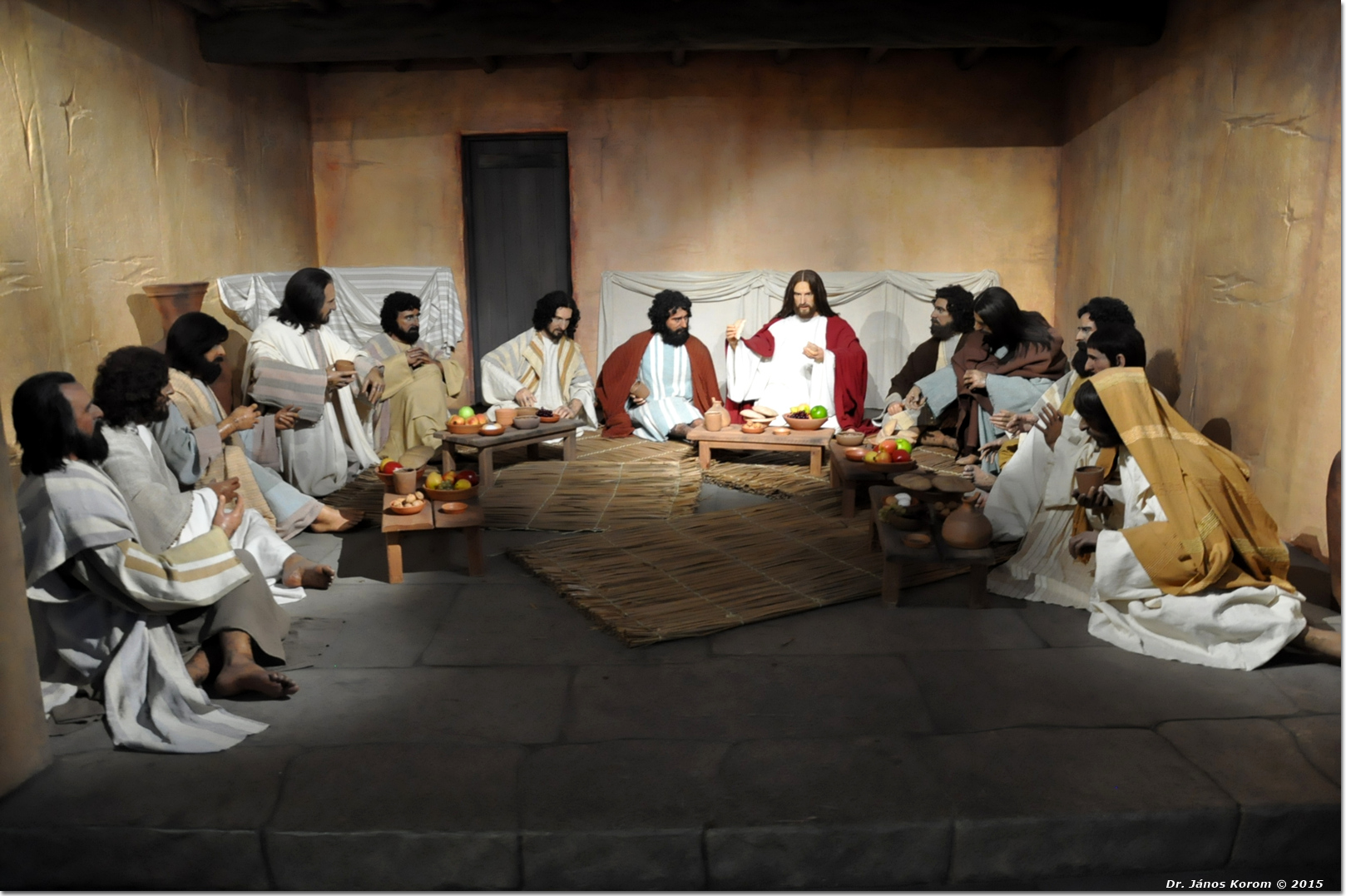
Scene 24: Last Supper of Christ

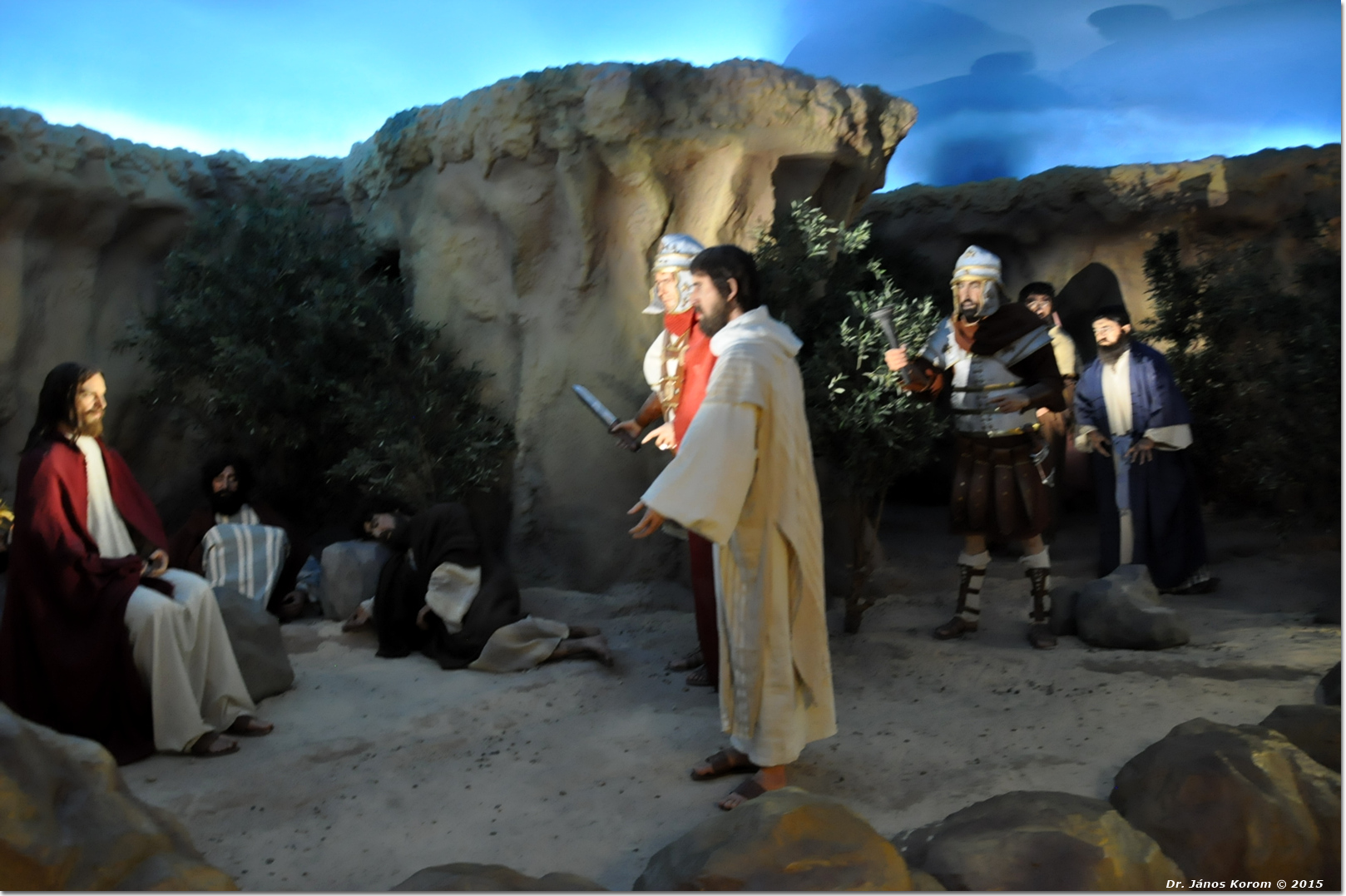
Scene 25: The agony of Jesus in the Garden of Gethsemane on the Mount of Olives

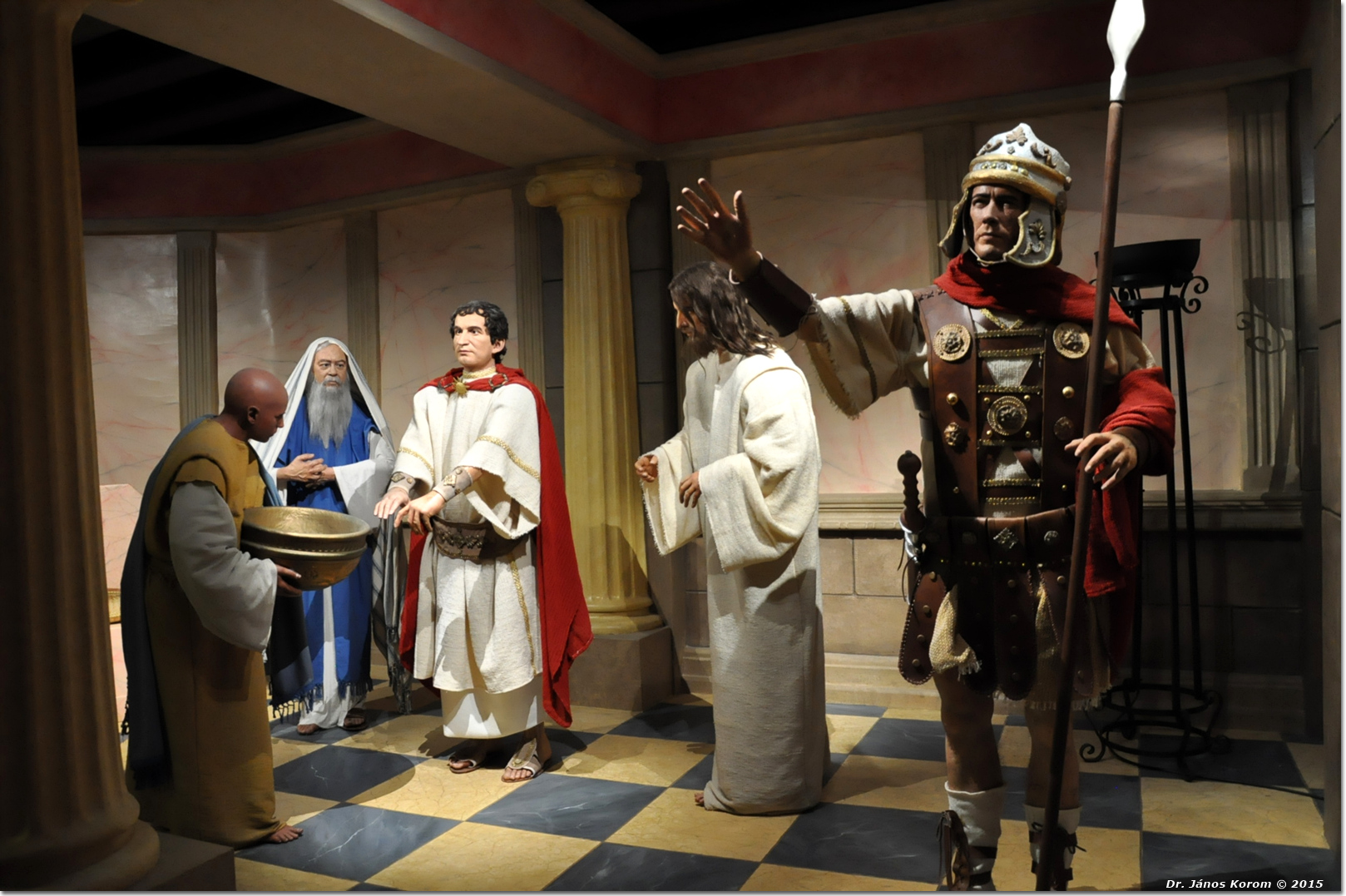
Scene 26: Condemnation of Jesus before Pontius Pilate

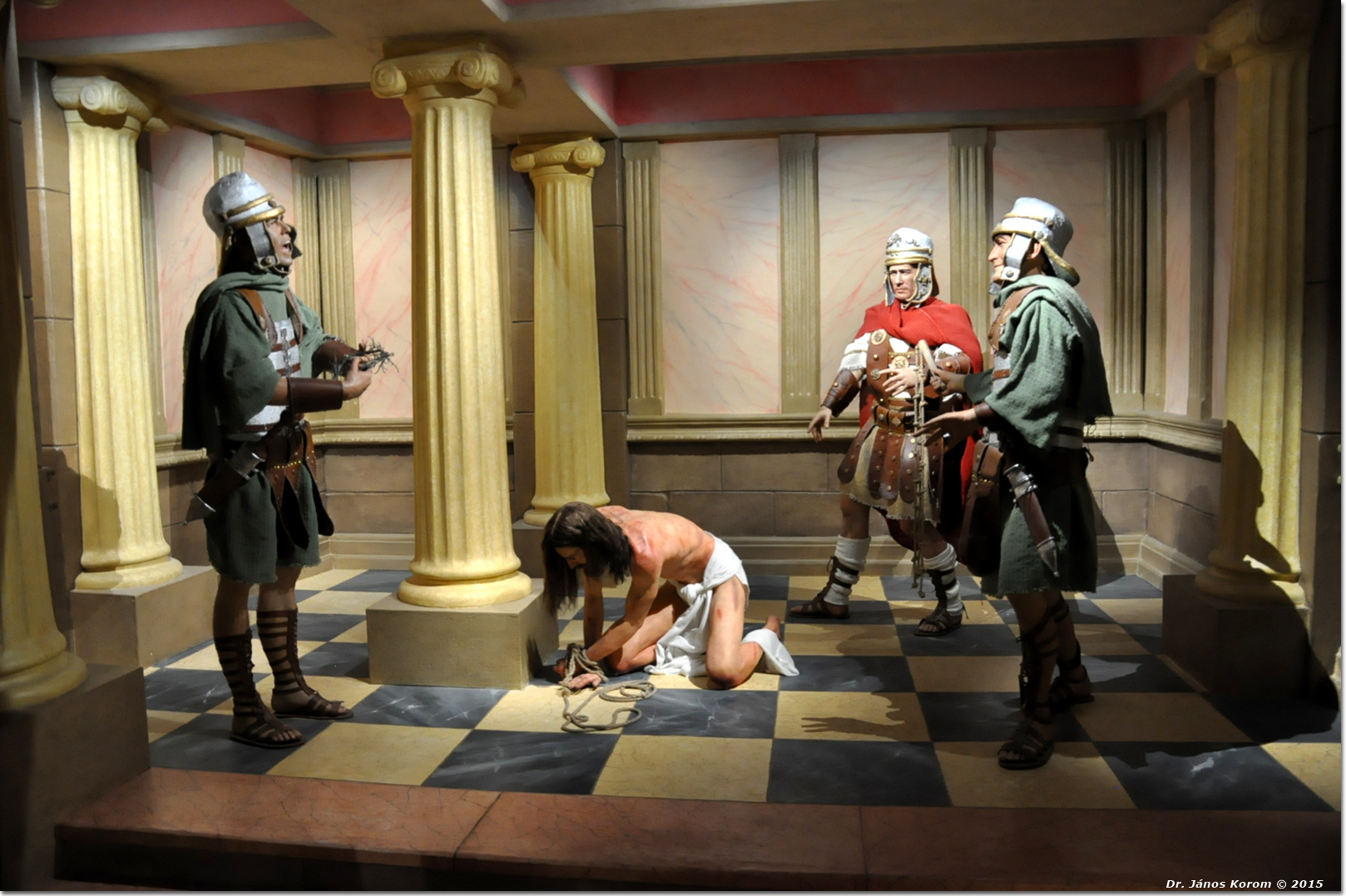
Scene 27: The flagellation of Christ

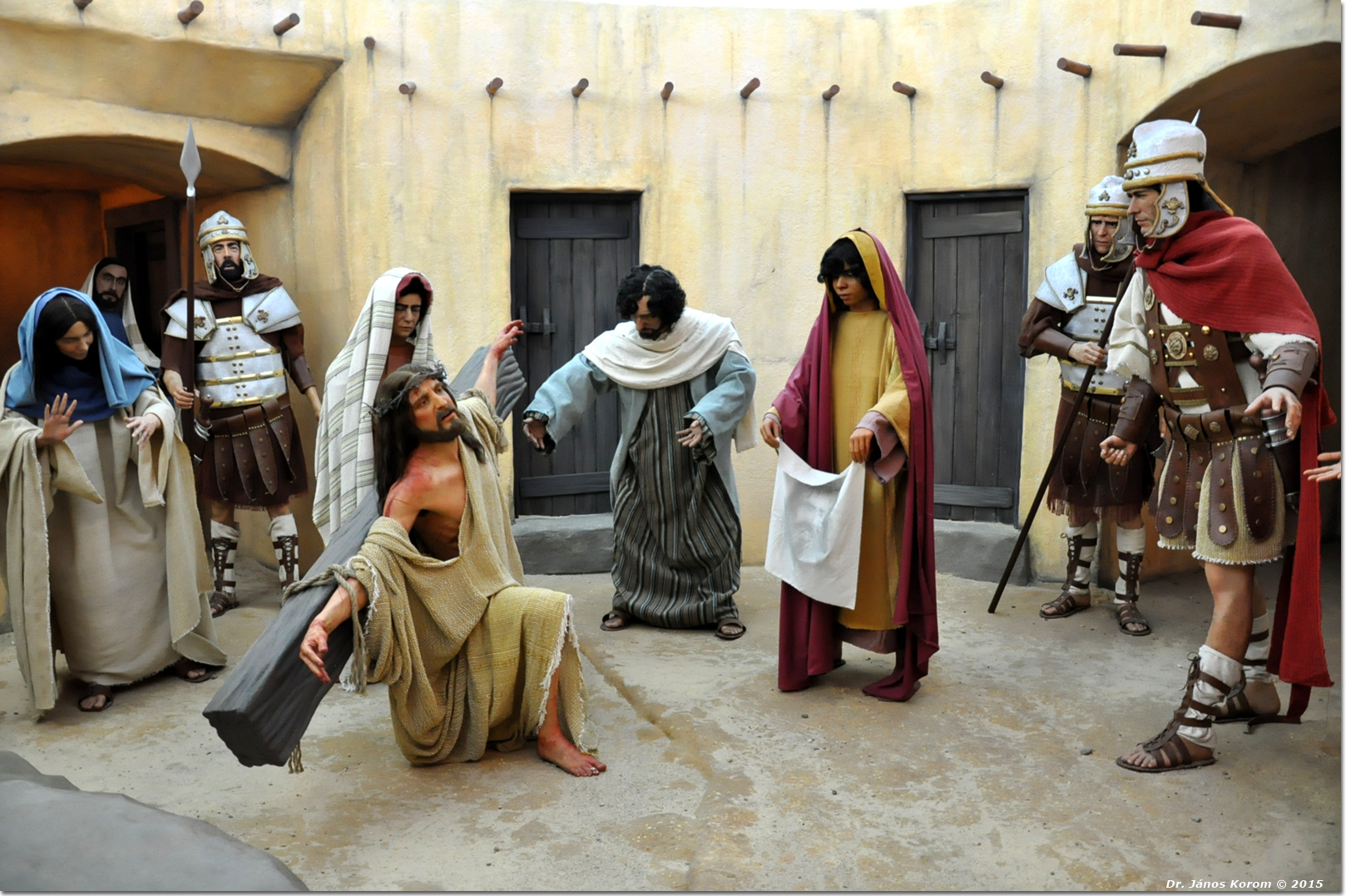
Scene 28: Jesus carrying the Cross on the way to Calvary

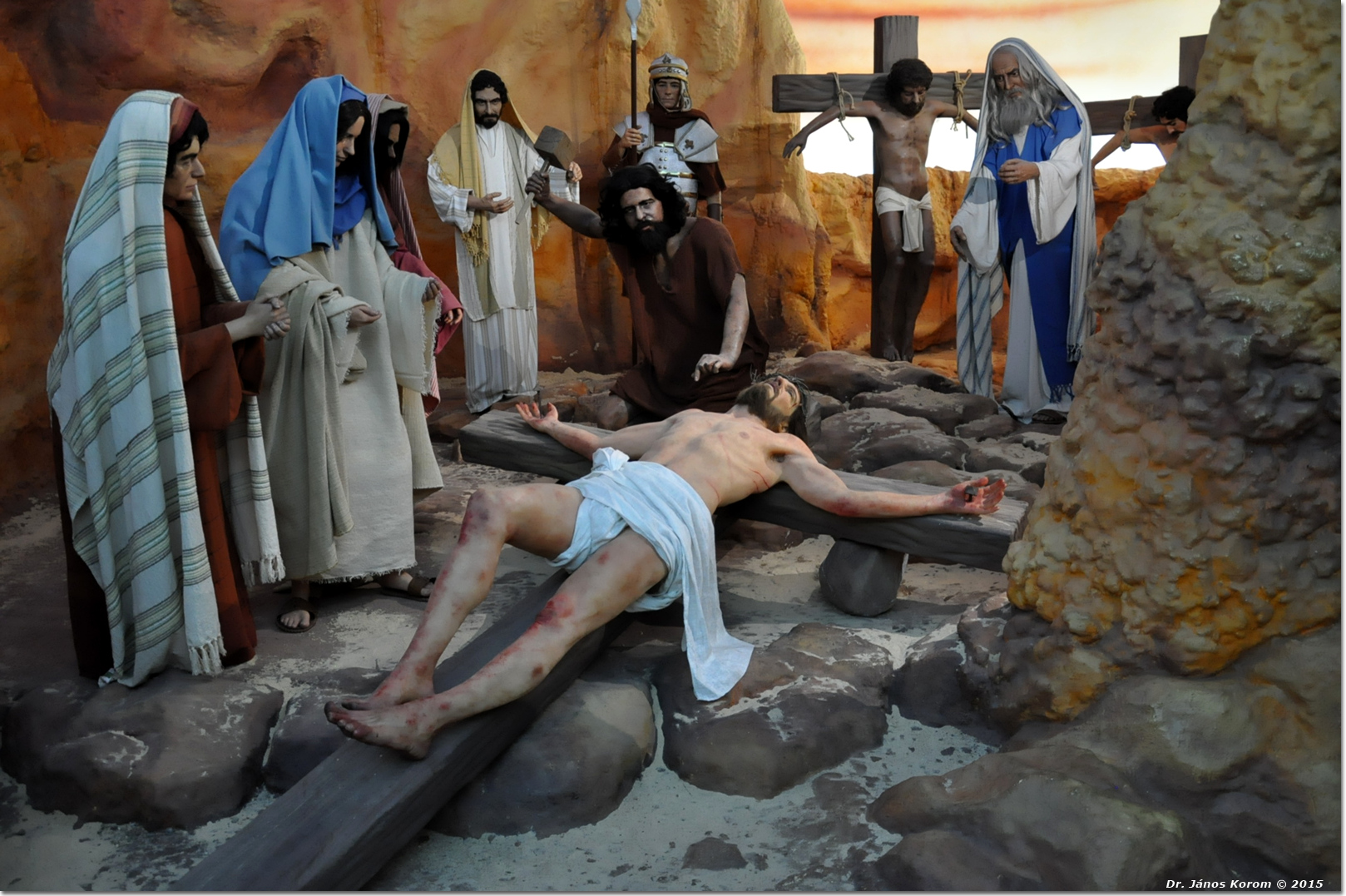
Scene 29: The crucifixion of Jesus

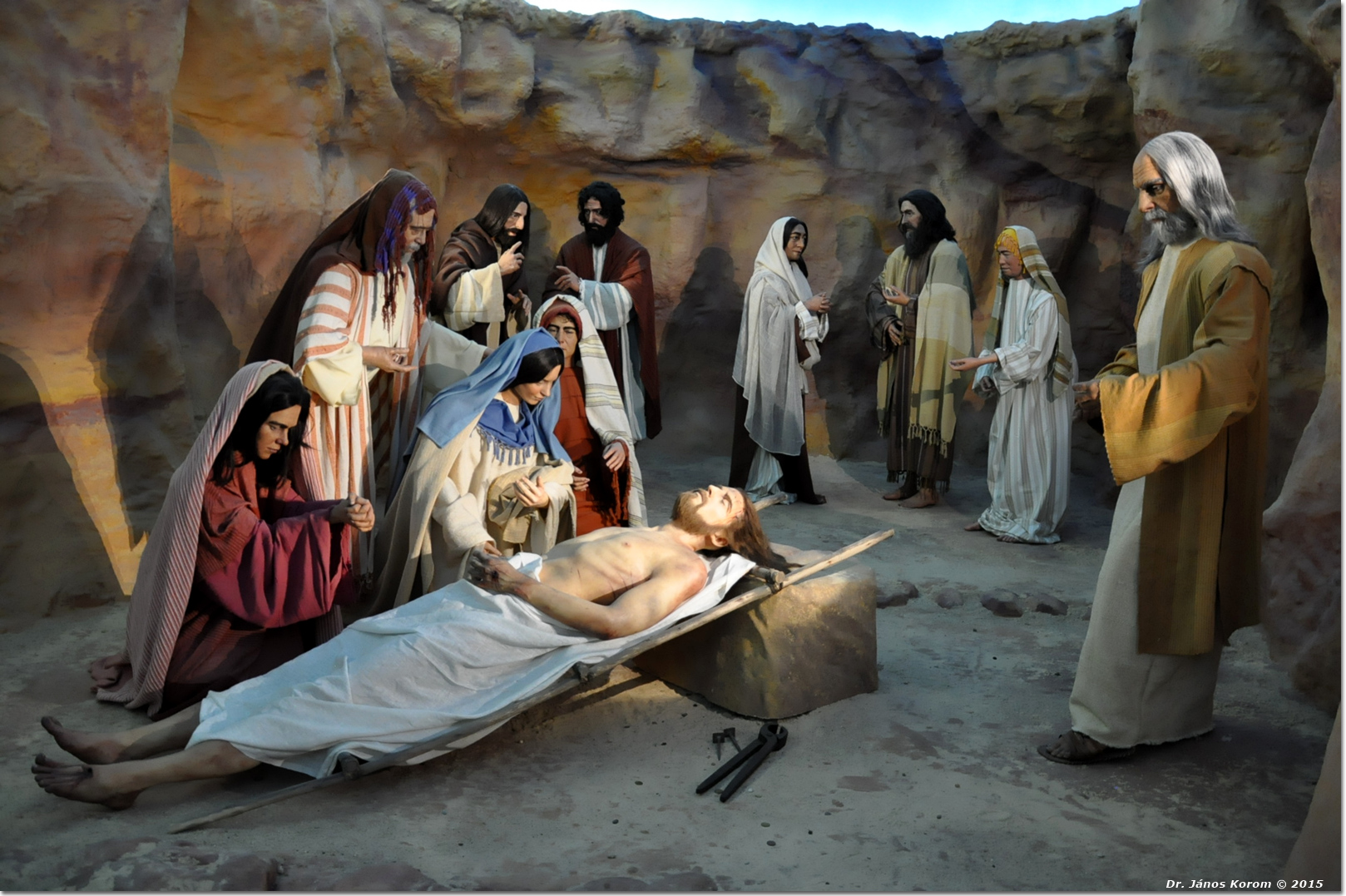
Scene 30: Descent from the Cross

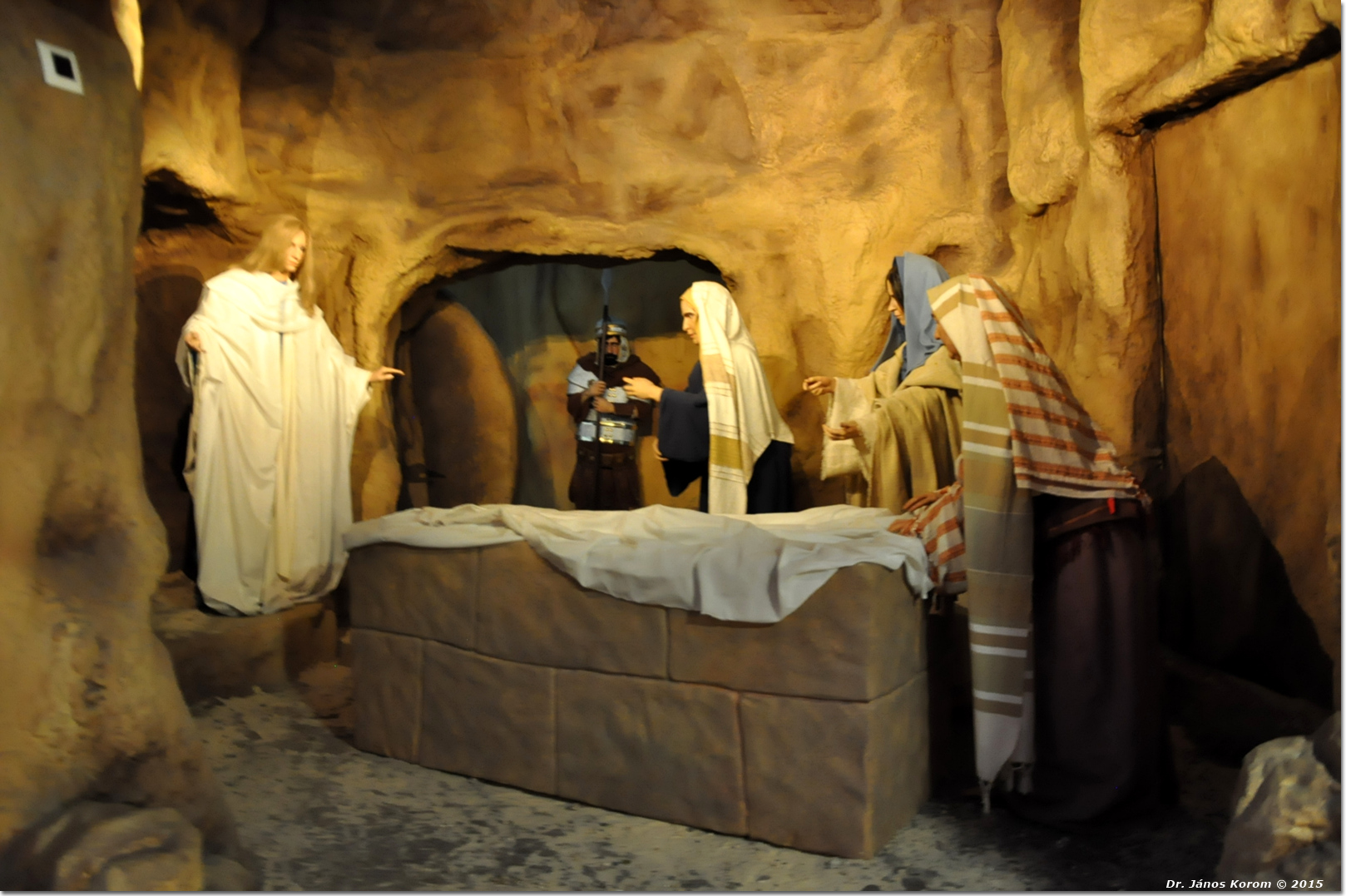
Scene 31: The resurrection of Jesus

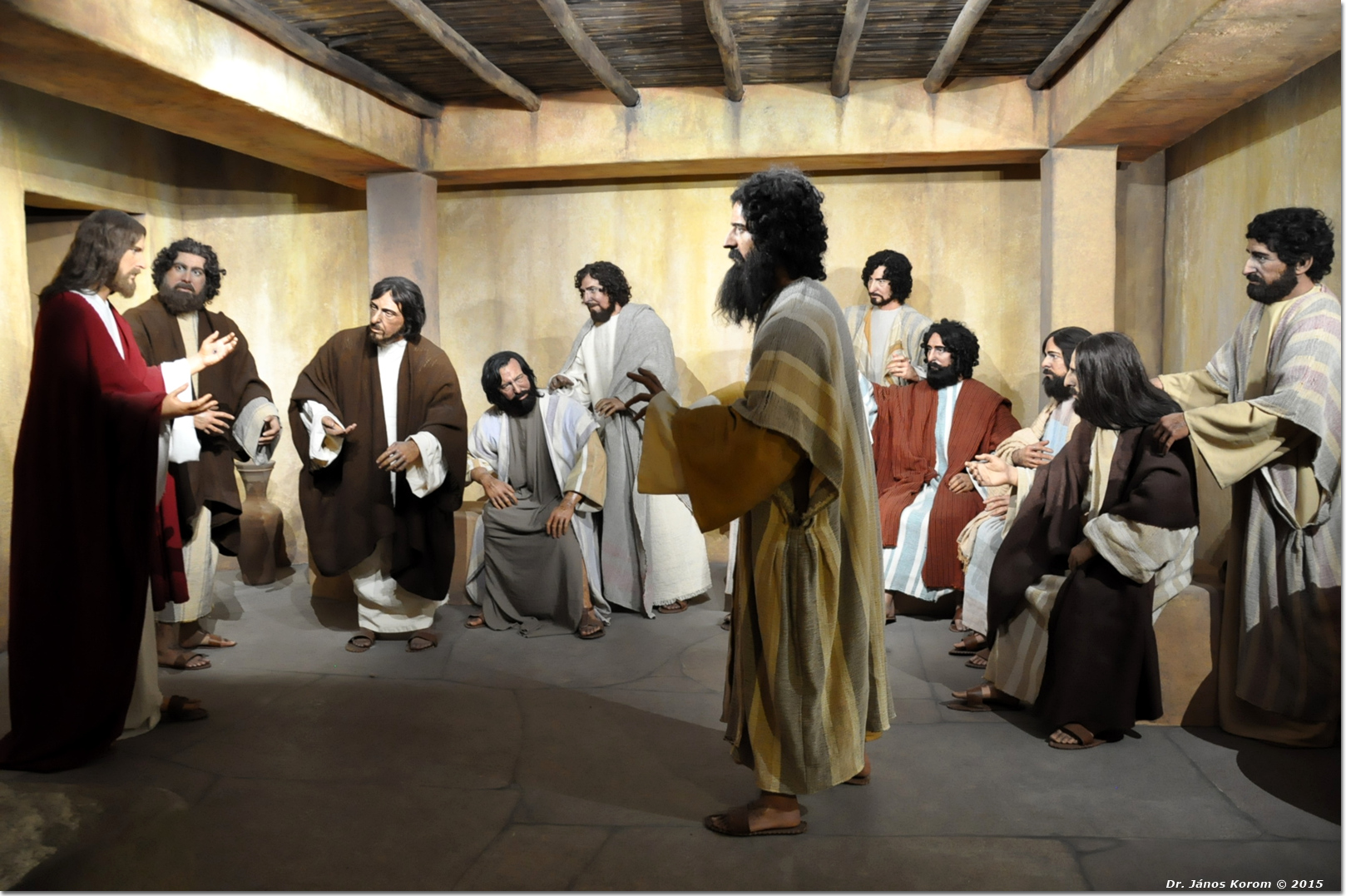
Scene 32: Jesus appears to His disciples

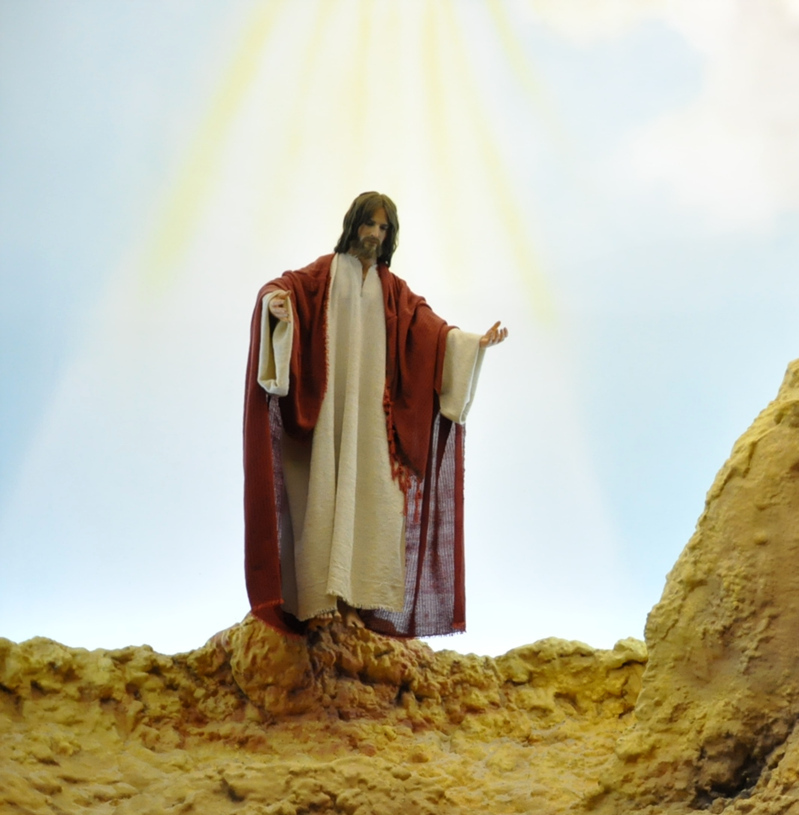
Scene 33: Jesus' ascension to Heaven

== See also ==
- List of statues of Jesus
- Wax Museum of Fátima
- Wax Museum of Lourdes
