= António Marto =

Portuguese cardinal

His Eminence António Marto GCC GCIH
- Cardinal; Bishop Emeritus of Leiria-Fátima
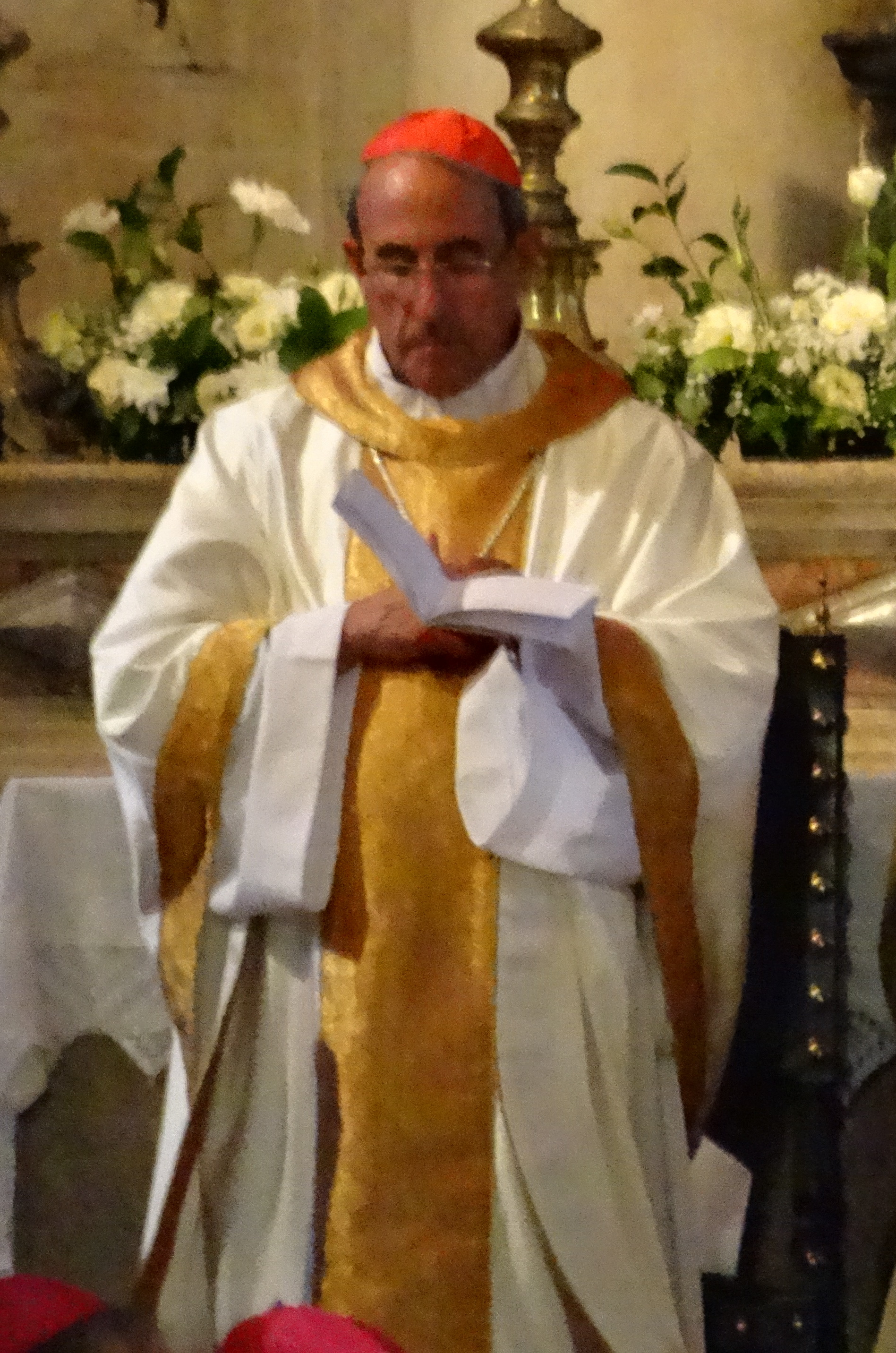
- Cardinal Marto in 2018.
- Church: Roman Catholic Church
- Diocese: Leiria-Fátima
- Appointed: 22 April 2006
- Installed: 25 June 2006
- Term ended: 28 January 2022
- Predecessor: Serafim de Sousa Ferreira e Silva
- Successor: José Ornelas Carvalho
- Other post: Cardinal-Priest of Santa Maria sopra Minerva (2018-)
- Previous posts: Auxiliary Bishop of Braga (2000-04); Titular Bishop of Bladia (2000-04); Bishop of Viseu (2004-06)

Orders
- Ordination: 7 November 1971
- Consecration: 11 February 2001 by Joaquim Gonçalves
- Created cardinal: 28 June 2018 by Pope Francis
- Rank: Cardinal-Priest

Personal details
- Born: António Augusto dos Santos Marto; 5 May 1947 (age 79) Tronco, Chaves, Portugal
- Parents: Serafim Augusto Marto; Maria da Purificação Correia dos Santos
- Education: Pontifical Gregorian University
- Motto: Adiutores Gaudii Vestri (Workers for Your Joy) (2Cor 1:24)

Styles of António Marto
- Reference style: His Eminence
- Spoken style: Your Eminence
- Religious style: Cardinal
- Informal style: Cardinal

António Augusto dos Santos Marto GCC GCIH (European Portuguese pronunciation: [ɐ̃ˈtɔni.u ˈmaɾtu, ɐ̃ˈtɔnju -]; born 5 May 1947) is a Portuguese prelate of the Catholic Church. He served as the Bishop of Leiria-Fátima from 2006 to 2022. Pope Francis elevated him to cardinal on 28 June 2018.

== Biography ==
=== Early life ===
António Marto was born on 5 May 1947 in Tronco, a small village of roughly 500 population, in Chaves, rural Portugal. His family was traditionally Catholic, and of humble background. His father, Serafim Augusto Marto, was a Fiscal Guard and his mother, Maria da Purificação Correia dos Santos, a schoolteacher. António was the youngest of four siblings, two of which died before he was born at age 4 and age 6, respectively; the latter was crushed in a brutal accident when the axle of an ox cart broke on the way back from the grape harvest. The surviving sister married and had offspring. António was the product of an unintended but ultimately welcomed pregnancy.

Despite coincidentally sharing his surname with the shepherd children of Fátima, Saints Francisco and Jacinta Marto, they have no familial relation; Marto's father came originally from the village of Santulhão, in Vimioso, instead.

António Marto was very fond of the local parish priest, who he used to engage in conversation, and who left him with a lasting impression on how he was held in high esteem by the whole community. At age 10, following his primary school education, António unexpectedly expressed his desire to become a priest; he initially met some resistance from his father, who even though was devoutly Catholic, had envisioned a career in military for him and was planning to send him to the Institute of the Pupils of the Army. Joining seminary, he was a keen student (with some shortcomings in mathematics) and was also very keen on past-times such as sports (namely volleyball, basketball, handball, and field hockey) and theatre (where he was, ironically, found best suited to play the devil in popular morality plays).

He started his Theology studies in Vila Real, but in 1968 the course was transferred to the Major Seminary in Porto, by decision of the bishop. He graduated at age 22, two years before the minimum age for ordination. Captivated by the spirit of the French worker-priest movement, and because of the then-prevalent idea that industrial-class workers had become largely disaffected with the Church, António Marto and two colleagues took up labour for a year in a metalworking factory producing parts for vehicle engines. This aided them in gaining valuable insights on the issues affecting working class masses and the world of trade unions.

=== Priesthood and episcopacy ===
Cardinal Marto was ordained to the priesthood in Rome on 7 November 1971, while he was studying for his doctorate in Theology from the Pontifical Gregorian University. At this time, he studied under Cardinal Joseph Ratzinger. He concluded his doctoral thesis in 1978, titled Esperança Cristã e Futuro do Homem: Doutrina Escatológica do Concílio Vaticano II ("Christian Hope and the Future of Man: The Eschatological Doctrine of the Second Vatican Council").

Pope John Paul II appointed him Auxiliary Bishop of Braga on 10 November 2000, assigning him the titular see of Tamata, and he was consecrated a bishop on 11 February 2001. He chose as his episcopal motto "Servidores da vossa alegria" (Servants of your joy). John Paul II later appointed him as the Bishop of Viseu on 22 April 2004.

Pope Benedict XVI named him Bishop of Leiria-Fátima on 22 April 2006. In this capacity, he played host to two Popes in their visits to the Sanctuary of Fátima: Benedict XVI in 2010, and Francis in 2017. From 2011 until 2014, Bishop Marto was delegate of the Portuguese Episcopal Conference to the Commission of the Bishops' Conferences of the European Union.

=== Cardinal ===
On 20 May 2018, Pentecost, Pope Francis announced he would make Marto a cardinal on 28 June. Marto learned of this as he was vesting for Mass at Leiria Cathedral: he noticed an unusual missed call from the apostolic nunciature and, worried that anything serious (like the Pope having died) had happened, he opened a voicemail with unexpected congratulations from Nuncio Rino Passigato on his appointment. He conducted the ceremony, in which he administered the sacrament of Confirmation to 60 youths, without commenting on the appointment; as Mass ended members of the congregation came to congratulate him while he was taking photographs with the newly confirmed.

At the 28 June consistory, he was assigned the titular church of Santa Maria sopra Minerva.

In 2020, during the height of the COVID-19 pandemic, Marto called the view that the pandemic was God's punishment "unchristian", and further said that such views could only be justified through "ignorance, sectarian fanaticism, or madness". On 25 March, Cardinal Marto renewed the consecration of Portugal and Spain to the Sacred Heart of Jesus and the Immaculate Heart of Mary, and added the names of twenty-four other countries (Albania, Bolivia, Colombia, Costa Rica, Cuba, Slovakia, Guatemala, Hungary, India, Mexico, Moldova, Nicaragua, Panama, Paraguay, Peru, Poland, Kenya, the Dominican Republic, Romania, Tanzania, East Timor and Zimbabwe) at the request of their respective episcopal conferences.

Marto criticised a petition by 500 Portuguese Catholics addressed to the Congregation for Divine Worship and the Discipline of the Sacraments to overturn the Portuguese Episcopal Conference's decision to administer Communion in the hand during the pandemic. Having clarified that the signatories "are entitled to their opinion", he lamented that Traditionalist Catholics were "questioning the very faith of their bishops", and further remarked on the topic of Communion in the hand: "Jesus Himself said 'take and eat'. Take, not 'open thy mouth'. 'Take and eat; take and drink'. Christ's gesture is significant." "Sometimes mouths have so much filth in them.... Sometimes I see callused hands receiving the Sacred Host and I am moved. These are hands that show labour, sacrifice, dedication to their families, dedication unto others. Hands of saints, perchance, saintly hands. Why would we ever restrict [receiving Communion with due reverence] to the tongue?"

Marto was hospitalized in November 2020 with a liver infection and submitted his resignation on 5 May 2021 citing the "limitations of his physical and mental resources". Pope Francis accepted his resignation as bishop of Leiria-Fátima on 28 January 2022.

Marto participated as a cardinal elector in the 2025 papal conclave that elected Pope Leo XIV.

== Views ==
=== Church role in the modern world ===
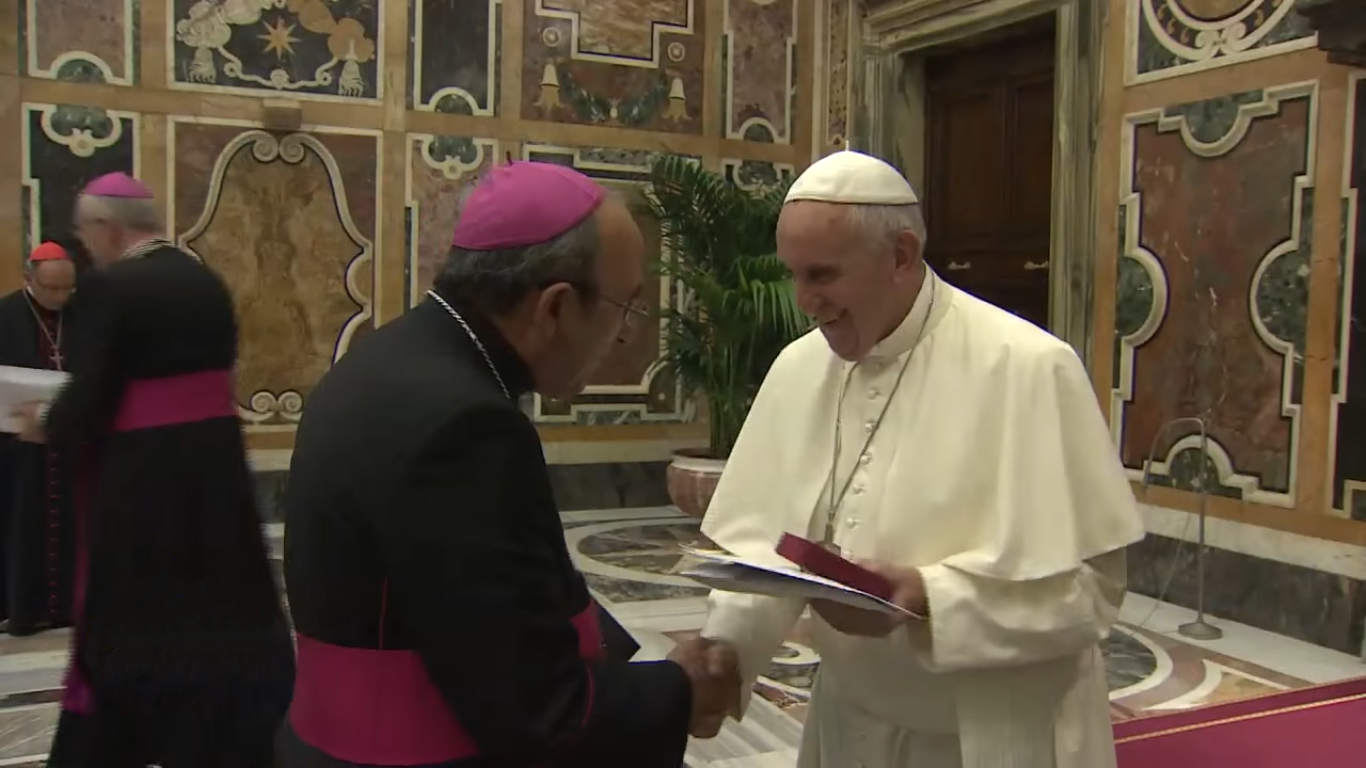
Bishop Marto and Pope Francis in 2015

Marto has been strongly aligned with the theology of Pope Francis, and has referred to himself as a "steadfast" partner on the Pope's reforms of the Church and the Roman Curia, to make them more "like Jesus, who approached the people, who went out on the streets; Pope Francis's pilgrim Church who goes out to meet everyone, no exception, without any discrimination."

He recognises that, with the end of Christendom, faith has become much more personalised, instead of mere tradition; therefore "it cannot be reduced to mere doctrine, or a set of rites, or rules of good behaviour"; the Church "must pay regard to the youth, realising that they look for a spiritual dimension that is more profound than what was usually imparted before." Regarding more traditionalist currents within the Catholic Church, he has lamented the "bulimia of rites and the anorexia of the Word": "the craving, the voracious appetite for consuming rites, and the lack thereof for God's Word".

He has called modern information technologies one of the greatest challenges facing modern societies, and therefore the Church, because it's a "new culture that imposes a new way of living, a new language, and new kinds of relationships and of communication". The younger generations are "natives" to this new cultural phenomenon; therefore the Church "cannot close its eyes to the novelty of this new world: that's what Pope Francis has been doing."

=== Asylum seekers ===
Marto has cited the European migrant crisis as an example of how societies have become more aggressive due to a culture based on populism that thrives on "fear and insecurity": "It is with sadness that I see a resurgence in certain kinds of nationalism that divide a Europe that used to be open and showed solidarity. Let us hope that the younger generations may be capable of giving Europe a new face."

Commenting on the U.S.-Mexico border crisis, he called the Trump administration family separation policy "immoral".

=== Clergy sexual abuse scandal ===
On 25 August 2018, Archbishop Carlo Maria Viganò, former apostolic nuncio to the United States, released an 11-page letter describing a series of warnings to the Vatican regarding sexual misconduct by Theodore McCarrick, accusing Pope Francis of failing to act on these reports and calling on him to resign. Marto addressed this as "an ignoble organised attack" on Francis, meant to "call into question his credibility and to create division within the Church"; he urged the faithful to remember the message of Our Lady of Fátima on the importance of unity within the Church, and to commit to the "culture of care" of which the Pope spoke, to protect children and combat every form of abuse.

=== Decriminalisation of euthanasia ===
As the Portuguese Parliament tabled a vote on the decriminalisation of euthanasia in February 2020, Marto underlined his opposition, saying "no one could expect a servant of the Gospel to be against life." He affirmed that to the Church, human life was not subject to vote for its intrinsic value, however, as far as the legislative process was concerned, he was supportive of some sort of public consultation, like a referendum, so that the whole of society could be involved in the decision-making process: he cited other religious confessions that were opposed to it, as well as non-confessional organisations, such as the leadership of the Order of Physicians.

He has also spoken critically of terms like "physician-assisted death" or "dignified death", which he regards as euphemisms used by certain proponents to muddle the concept of euthanasia for ideological gain.

== Honours ==
- Grand Cross of the Order of Christ, Portugal (11 May 2010)
- Grand Cross of the Order of Prince Henry, Portugal (18 June 2012)

== See also ==
- Cardinals created by Francis
- Catholic Church in Portugal

Catholic Church titles
Preceded by Jacinto Tomás de Carvalho Botelho	Auxiliary Bishop of Braga; 2000 – 2004	Succeeded by António Francisco dos Santos
Preceded by Oswald Gracias	Titular Bishop of Bladia; 2000 – 2004	Succeeded by Bernardino Cruz Cortez
Preceded by António Ramos Monteiro	Bishop of Viseu; 2004 – 2006	Succeeded by Ilídio Pinto Leandro
Preceded by Serafim de Sousa Ferreira e Silva	Bishop of Leiria-Fátima; 2006 – 2022	Succeeded by José Ornelas Carvalho
Preceded by Cormac Murphy O'Connor	Cardinal-Priest of Santa Maria sopra Minerva; 2018 – present	Incumbent
