= Serafim de Sousa Ferreira e Silva =

Portuguese Roman Catholic bishop (born 1930)

His Excellency Serafim de Sousa Ferreira e Silva
- Bishop Emeritus of Leiria–Fátima
- Church: Roman Catholic Church
- Diocese: Leiria–Fátima
- Appointed: 13 May 1987 (Coadjutor)
- Installed: 2 February 1993
- Term ended: 22 April 2006
- Predecessor: Alberto Cosme do Amaral
- Successor: António Marto

Orders
- Ordination: 1 August 1954
- Consecration: 16 June 1979 by Eurico Dias Nogueira

Personal details
- Born: 16 June 1930 (age 96) Santa Maria de Avioso, Maia, Portugal

Serafim de Sousa Ferreira e Silva (born 16 June 1930) is a Portuguese Roman Catholic prelate, who served as Bishop of the Leiria–Fátima from 1993 until his retirement in 2006.

== Early life and education ==
Serafim de Sousa Ferreira e Silva was born on 16 June 1930 in Santa Maria de Avioso, in the Diocese of Porto, Portugal. He completed his philosophical and theological studies at the seminary of Porto and was ordained a priest on 1 August 1954 for the Diocese of Porto.

During his priestly ministry, he served as professor at the Major Seminary of Porto and at the Instituto Superior de Serviço Social do Porto, judge of the ecclesiastical tribunal, and director of the diocesan weekly Voz Portucalense. He also founded and directed the journal Síntese.

== Episcopal ministry ==
On 30 April 1979, he was appointed Titular Bishop of Lemellefa and Auxiliary Bishop of Braga by Pope John Paul II. He was consecrated bishop on 16 June 1979 by Archbishop Eurico Dias Nogueira.

In 1981, he was appointed Auxiliary Bishop of the Patriarchate of Lisbon. On 13 May 1987, he was named Coadjutor Bishop of Leiria–Fátima, succeeding as diocesan bishop on 2 February 1993.

As bishop of Leiria–Fátima, he oversaw pastoral initiatives connected with the Sanctuary of Fátima and promoted diocesan synodal activity.

His resignation was accepted on 22 April 2006 upon reaching the canonical age limit, and he became Bishop Emeritus of Leiria–Fátima. He was succeeded by António Marto.

== Later life ==
After retirement, he continued residing in Fátima and remained active in pastoral and spiritual initiatives.
