= Fátima prayers =

Collection of seven Catholic prayers

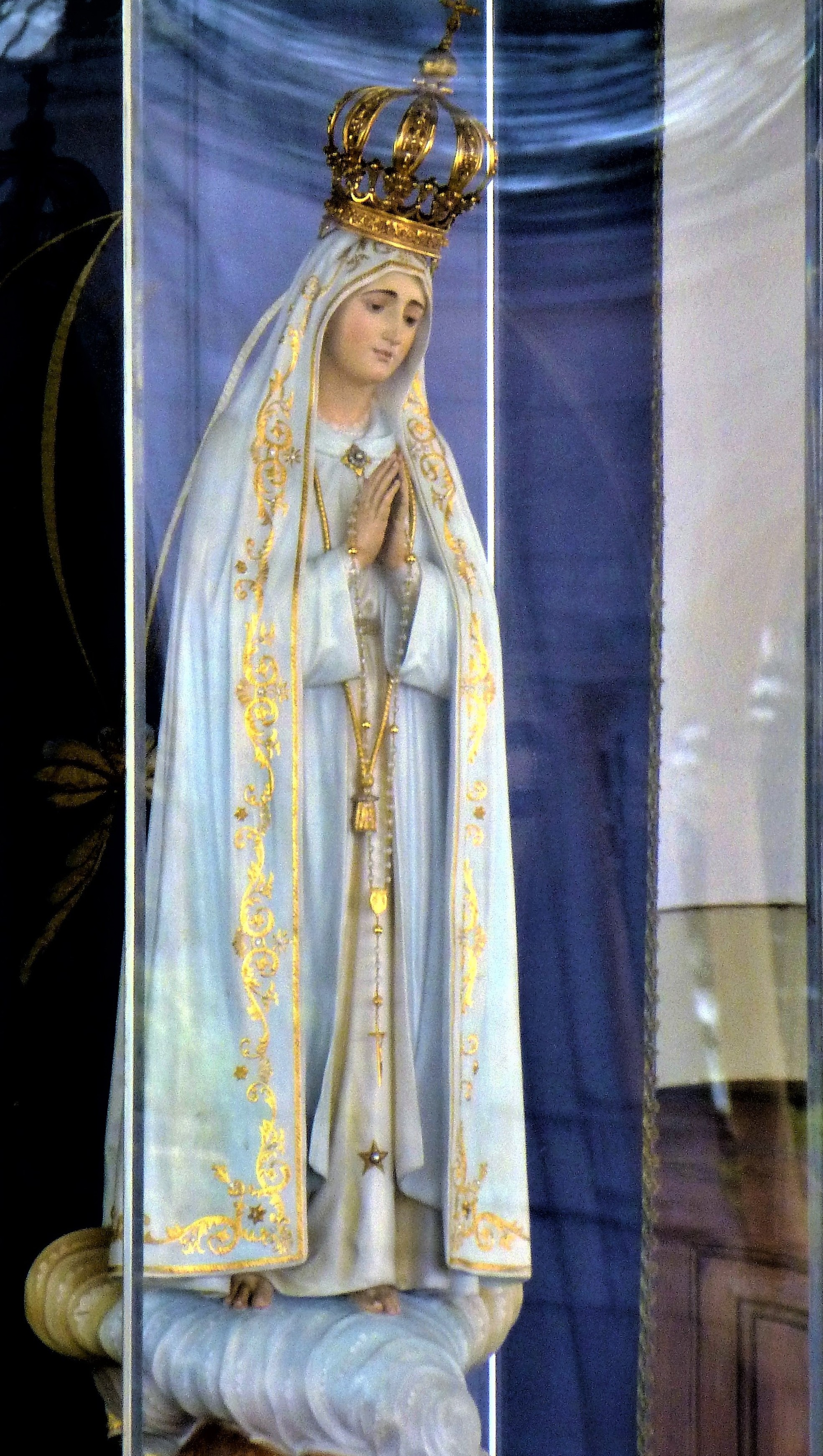
Original statue of Our Lady of Fátima.

The Fátima prayers (Portuguese pronunciation: [ˈfatimɐ]) are a collection of seven Catholic prayers associated with the 1917 Marian apparitions at Fátima, Portugal. Of the seven prayers, reportedly, the first two were taught to the three child visionaries by the Angel of Peace in 1916, the next three were taught to them by Our Lady of Fátima herself during the course of the apparitions, and the final two were taught to Lúcia de Jesus Rosa dos Santos (the eldest and last survivor of the three) in 1931 by Jesus Christ when she was already a nun. Of the seven prayers, the rosary decade prayer is the best-known and the most widely recited. For each prayer below, an English translation is given alongside the Portuguese original.

== Angel of Peace ==
=== Theological Prayer ===
In the Spring of 1916, the Angel of Peace taught the three children of Fátima this prayer, making them repeat it three times.

My God, I believe, adore, hope and love You! I ask pardon of You for those who do not believe, do not adore, do not hope and do not love You.

Meu Deus! Eu creio, adoro, espero e amo-Vos. Peço-Vos perdão para os que não crêem, não adoram, não esperam e não Vos amam.

The Angel then said, "Pray thus. The Hearts of Jesus and Mary are attentive to the voice of your supplications." To believe, adore, hope, and love God is to practice the theological virtues of faith, hope and charity.

=== Trinitarian Prayer ===
In August 1916, the Angel appeared again and taught the children this prayer, again making them repeat it three times.

Most Holy Trinity, Father, Son, Holy Ghost, I adore You profoundly, and I offer You the most precious Body, Blood, Soul and Divinity of Jesus Christ, present in all the tabernacles of the world, in reparation for the outrages, sacrileges and indifference with which He Himself is offended. And, through the infinite merits of His most Sacred Heart, and the Immaculate Heart of Mary, I beg of You the conversion of poor sinners.

Santíssima Trindade, Padre, Filho, Espírito Santo, (adoro-Vos profundamente) e ofereço-Vos o preciosíssimo Corpo, Sangue, Alma e Divindade de Jesus Cristo, presente em todos os Sacrários da terra, em reparação dos ultrajes, sacrilégios e indiferenças com que Ele mesmo é ofendido. E pelos méritos infinitos do Seu Santíssimo Coração e do Coração Imaculado de Maria, peço-Vos a conversão dos pobres pecadores.

Sacrilege against the Eucharist includes receiving Communion while in a state of mortal sin.

== Our Lady of Fátima ==
=== Trinitarian Prayer ===
During the initial apparition on May 13, 1917, Our Lady bathed the children in light, and they were "moved by an interior impulse that was ... communicated to [them]", so they said this prayer.

O most Holy Trinity, I adore You! My God, my God, I love You in the most Blessed Sacrament!

Ó Santíssima Trindade, eu Vos adoro. Meu Deus, meu Deus, eu Vos amo no Santíssimo Sacramento.

The Prayer begins with praise towards the Holy Trinity. God the Father, God the Son (Jesus Christ) and God the Holy Spirit. One God, Three Divine Persons. Three Divine Persons that are each fully God.

It concludes with an expression of love and praise towards the Holy Eucharist. The Holy Eucharist is Jesus Christ’s Body, Blood, Soul and Divinity. The prayer also affirms that the Holy Eucharist is God, because He is Jesus.

=== Offering Prayer ===
On June 13, 1917, Our Lady said to the children "Sacrifice yourselves for sinners, and say [this prayer] many times, especially whenever you make some sacrifice[.]"

O Jesus, it is for love of You, for the conversion of sinners, and in reparation for the sins committed against the Immaculate Heart of Mary.

Ó Jesus, é por Vosso amor, pela conversão dos pecadores e em reparação pelos pecados cometidos contra o Imaculado Coração de Maria.

=== Rosary Decade Prayer ===
As the most well-known of the five approved prayers, this is often simply called the "Fátima Prayer". On that same day (June 13, 1917), Our Lady taught the children to say this prayer after each decade (a set of ten Hail Marys) of the Rosary. She also encouraged the children to continue daily recitation of the Rosary.

O my Jesus, forgive us, save us from the fire of hell. Lead all souls to Heaven, especially those who are most in need.

Ó meu Jesus, perdoai-nos, livrai-nos do fogo do inferno; levai as alminhas todas para o Céu, principalmente aquelas que mais precisarem. (Note: Note the minor differences in punctuation between these sources.)

== Tuy Chapel ==
These prayers were reportedly taught privately by Jesus to Sister Lúcia in 1931, when she was a nun in the Galician town of Tuy across the border with Spain. These alleged revelations of Christ have not been approved by the Church, and only the angelic and Marian ones of 1916 and 1917 are approved.

=== Conversion Prayer ===
By thy pure and Immaculate Conception, O Mary, obtain the conversion of Russia, Spain, Portugal, Europe and the whole world!

=== Salvation Prayer ===
Sweet Heart of Mary, be the salvation of Russia, Spain, Portugal, Europe and the whole world.

== See also ==
- Our Lady of Fátima
- Catholic devotions
