= Ordem Militar de Cristo =

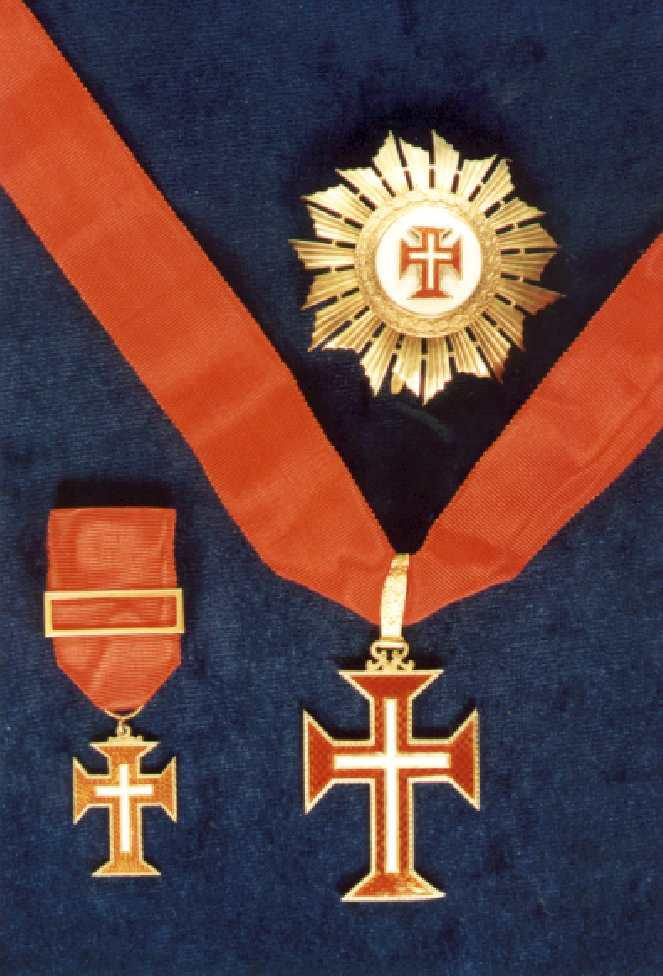
Insignia of the order

The Ordem Militar de Cristo (Military Order of Christ) is a Portuguese honorific Order which takes its name from the extinct Order of Christ (1910) , which is given for distinguished service in the performance of functions in sovereign positions or public administration, and for the judiciary and diplomacy, which is seen as being particularly distinguished.

== Degrees ==
The Order of Christ Military consists of five levels:

- Grand Cross (GCC)
- Grand Officer (GOC)
- Commander (ComC)
- Officer (OC)
- Knight (CvC) / Dame (DmC)

Like other Portuguese Orders, the title of Honorary Member (MHC, going by its Portuguese acronym for Membro-Honorário) can also be bestowed on institutions and locations.

== List of awardees ==
19TH CENTURY

- Bernardino António Gomes (Cavaleiro)
- Bernardino António Gomes, Filho (Comendador)
- Antonio Joaquim da Fonseca Neves (presidente da Camara Municipal d'esta Cidate Aracaju Sergipe; Cavaleiro)
- Henrique de Barros Gomes (Grã-Cruz)
- Inácio de Sousa Rolim (Comendador)
- Manuel José Gavinho (comendador)
- José Gavinho Viana (comendador)
- Antônio José Gomes Bastos, 2º Barão de Catas Altas
- Francisco José Pacheco, Segundo Barão de São Francisco Portugal, Visconde de São Francisco Brasil

20TH CENTURY

- Manuel de Almeida Amaral
- João Maria Feijóo
- Carlos Carvalhas
- Juvenal de Araújo
- Joaquim Maria de Mendonça Lino Netto
- Manuel José Pinto Osório
- Fernando Abbott Galvão
- Francisco Sá Carneiro, a título póstumo.
- Carlos Alberto da Mota Pinto
- Mário Soares, former Portuguese Prime Minister and former President of the Portuguese Republic.
- Leonardo Ribeiro de Almeida
- Freitas do Amaral
- Vítor Pereira Crespo
- Francisco Pinto Balsemão, former Portuguese prime minister
- Edvard Beneš, Czechoslovak politician and president
- Joaquim Letria, journalist.
- Ramalho Eanes, former Portuguese President
- Gonçalo Ribeiro Telles, architect
- Jaime Gama, professor, journalist and politician.
- Rui Machete
- Eurico de Melo, engineer and politician
- José Saraiva Martins
- Carlos Augusto Corrêa Paes d’Assumpção, posthumously
- João de Deus Pinheiro
- Aristides de Sousa Mendes, posthumously.
- António Alçada Baptista
- Carlos de Azeredo
- Cavaco Silva, President of the Portuguese Republic.
- Durão Barroso, former prime minister of Portugal and ex-President of the European Commission.
- José Cutileiro
- Mota Amaral
- Vasco Joaquim Rocha Vieira
- António Cardoso e Cunha
- Filipe VI da Espanha, King of Spain.
- António Mega Ferreira
- Francisco Lucas Pires
- Nuno Krus Abecassis, posthumously.
- Ana Gomes
- José Menéres Pimentel
- António Guterres, former Prime Minister of Portugal.
- João Salgueiro
- Francisco Seixas da Costa
- João Henrique Ulrich Jr.
- José Augusto Prestes (GOC), former president of C.R. Vasco da Gama.
- Cyro Aranha, former president of C.R. Vasco da Gama.

21ST CENTURY

- Pedro Santana Lopes, former Portuguese Prime Minister.
- António Pinto da França
- Gonçalo Santa Clara Gomes
- Fernando Andersen de Guimarães
- José Luís Gomes
- Manuel Fernandes Pereira
- João de Vallera
- Álvaro Mendonça e Moura
- Miguel Sousa (comendador)
- António Vitorino
- António Barreto
- Manuela Ferreira Leite
- João Salgueiro
- Pedro Pires de Miranda
- António de Almeida Santos
- Henrique Nascimento Rodrigues
- Eduardo Catroga
- Rui Moura Ramos
- Fernando Pinto Monteiro
- Carlos César
- Luís Vasco Valença Pinto
- José António Mesquita
- Alexandre do Nascimento
- José Souto de Moura
- José Manuel Garcia Mendes Cabeçadas
- D. Letícia Ortiz Rocasolado (Queen of Spain)
- Fernando Teixeira dos Santos
- Mariano Gago
- Assunção Esteves
- Guilherme d'Oliveira Martins
- Alberto João Jardim

== Institutions ==
- Associação Académica de Coimbra
- Club Sport Marítimo
- Colégio Militar
- Faculdade de Medicina da Universidade Federal do Rio de Janeiro
- Instituto Militar dos Pupilos do Exército
- Sociedade Histórica da Independência de Portugal
- Sporting Clube de Portugal
- Sport Lisboa e Benfica
- Club de Regatas Vasco da Gama
- Corpo de Polícia de Segurança Pública da Província de Cabo Verde (1974)
- Polícia de Segurança Pública (1988)
- Corpo de Polícia de Segurança Pública de Macau (1991)
- Atlético Clube de Portugal (1951)

== List of council members ==
- Kaúlza de Arriaga (1966-1974)

== See also ==
- Ordens honoríficas de Portugal
- Ordem de Cristo, for a historical context of medieval military order.
- Imperial Ordem de Nosso Senhor Jesus Cristo, Brazilian order created from the former Portuguese royal order.
- António Júlio de Castro Fernandes
