= Mário Júlio de Almeida Costa =

Portuguese jurist and politician (1927–2025)

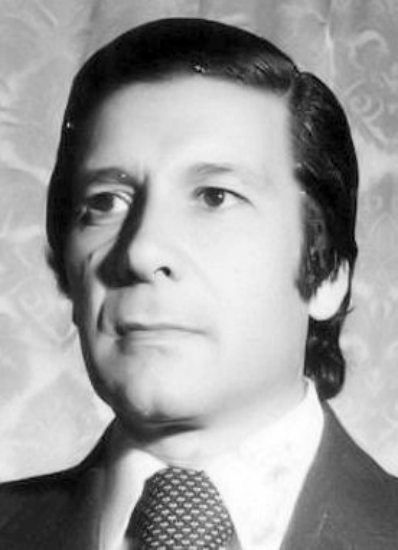
- Costa in the 1960s

President of the Corporative Chamber
- In office 16 November 1973 – 25 April 1974
- Preceded by: Luís Supico Pinto
- Succeeded by: position abolished

Personal details
- Born: 20 October 1927; Vagos, Portugal
- Died: 6 August 2025 (aged 97)
- Political party: ANP
- Education: University of Coimbra
- Occupation: Jurist

Mário Júlio de Almeida Costa (20 October 1927 – 6 August 2025) was a Portuguese jurist and politician. A member of the People's National Action, he served as president of the Corporative Chamber from 1973 to 1974.

Costa died on 6 August 2025, at the age of 97.
