= Diocese of Leiria–Fátima =

Roman Catholic diocese in Portugal

Coordinates: 39.7461°N 8.8070°W

Diocese of Leiria–Fátima Dioecesis Leiriensis–Fatimensis Diocese de Leiria–Fátima

Catholic
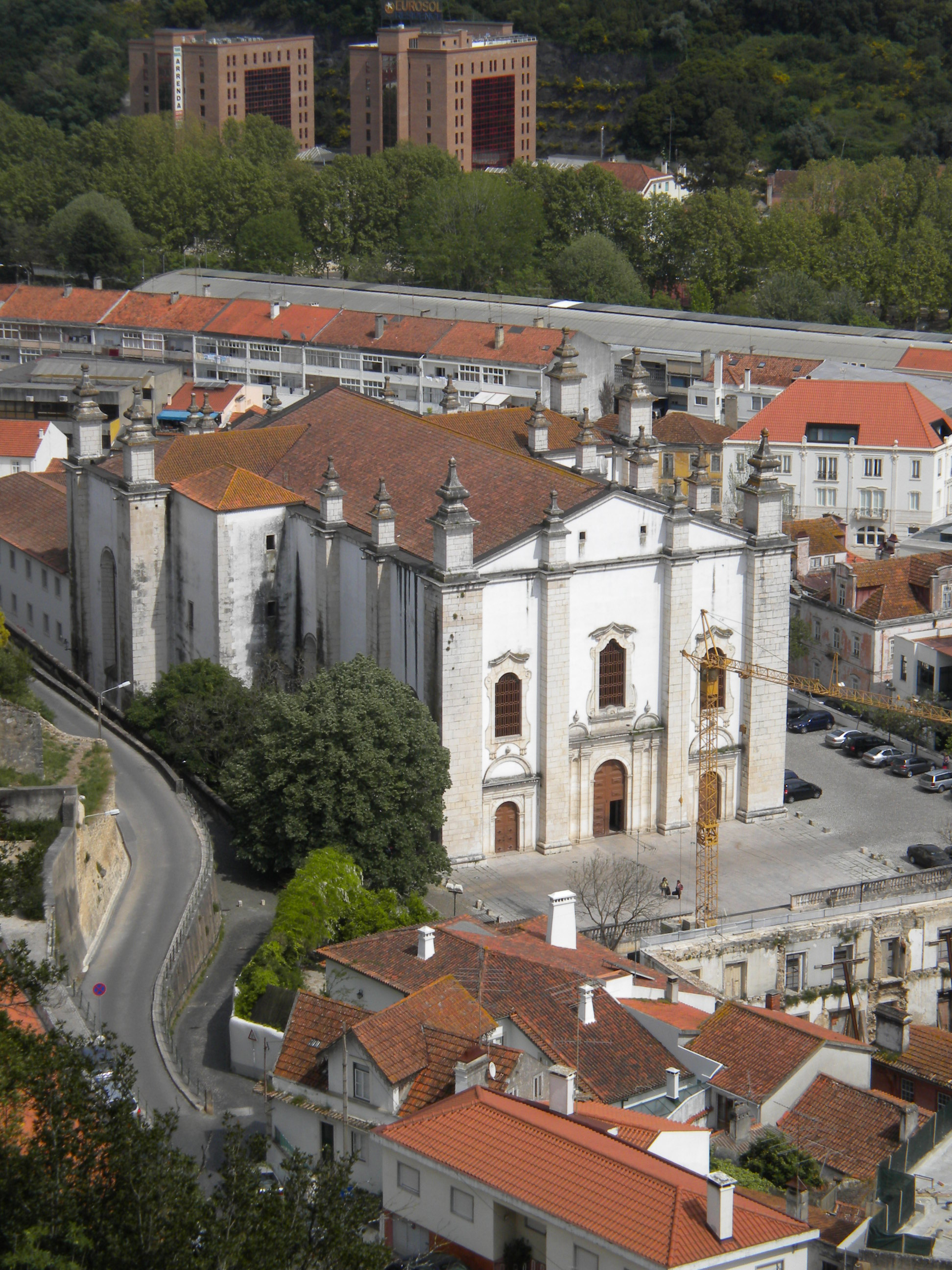
- The Episcopal Cathedral of Leiria–Fátima

Location
- Country: Portugal
- Ecclesiastical province: Lisbon
- Metropolitan: Patriarchate of Lisbon

Statistics
- Area: 1,700 km^{2} (660 sq mi)
- Population: Total; Catholics: (as of 2021); 290,000; 248,500 (85.7%)
- Parishes: 73

Information
- Denomination: Catholic
- Sui iuris church: Latin Church
- Rite: Roman Rite
- Established: 17 January 1918
- Cathedral: Cathedral of the Immaculate Conception in Leiria
- Patron saint: Our Lady of Fátima; St Augustine of Hippo
- Secular priests: 89 (Diocesan); 69 (Religious Orders)

Current leadership
- Pope: Leo XIV
- Bishop: José Ornelas Carvalho, S.C.I.
- Metropolitan Archbishop: Rui I
- Bishops emeritus: Serafim de Sousa Ferreira e Silva Bishop Emeritus (1993-2006); António Augusto dos Santos MartoBishop Emeritus (2006-2022)

Map
- Location of the Diocese of Leiria–Fátima

Website
- Website of the Diocese

The Diocese of Leiria–Fátima (Latin: Dioecesis Leiriensis–Fatimensis) is a Latin Church diocese of the Catholic church in Portugal. It is suffragan diocese in the ecclesiastical province of the Metropolitan Patriarchate of Lisbon.

The main church of the episcopal see is the Cathedral of Our Lady of the Conception, in Leiria. It also has two minor basilicas, both in Fátima: the Basilica of Our Lady of the Rosary and the Basilica of the Holy Trinity, and also a World Heritage Site: the Monastery of Saint Mary of the Victory, in Batalha, as a decommissioned former Cathedral (now ruined): Church of Our Lady of Pena.

== History ==
- May 22, 1545: Established as Diocese of Leiria, on territory split off from the Diocese of Coimbra
- In 1585 it gained territory from Metropolitan Archdiocese of Lisboa, again on 1614.10.09
- Suppressed on September 30, 1881, its territories being reassigned (back) to Patriarchal See of Lisboa and to Diocese of Coimbra
- Restored on January 17, 1918 as Diocese of Leiria, regaining territories from Patriarchal See of Lisboa and Diocese of Coimbra
- On March 25, 1957 it gained territory from Patriarchal See of Lisboa
- Enjoyed Papal visits from Pope Paul VI in May 1967 and Pope John Paul II in May 1982, May 1991 and May 2000.
- Renamed on May 13, 1984 as Diocese of Leiria–Fátima, however without a co-cathedral.
- Enjoyed Papal visits from Pope Benedict XVI in May 2010 and Pope Francis in May 2017.
- Storm Kristin damaged the Cathedral of Our Lady of the Conception on 28 January 2026.

== Statistics ==
As per 2014, it pastorally served 266,792 Catholics (91.6% of 291,144 total) on 1,700 km^{2} in 75 parishes and 6 missions with 156 priests (92 diocesan, 64 religious), 767 lay religious (77 brothers, 690 sisters) and 6 seminarians.

== Bishops ==
=== Bishops of Leiria ===
- Brás de Barros, C.R.S.A. (1545-1556)
- Gaspar do Casal, O.E.S.A. (1557-1579)
- António Pinheiro (1579-1582)
- Pedro de Castilho (1583-1604)
- Martim Afonso Mexia (1605-1615)
- António de Santa Maria (1616-1623)
- Francisco de Menezes (1625-1627)
- Dinis de Melo e Castro (1627-1636)
- Pedro Barbosa de Eça (1636-1640)
- Pedro Vieira da Silva (1670-1676)
- Domingos de Gusmão, O.P. (1677-1678)
- José de Lencastre, O.Carm. (1681-1694)
- Álvaro de Abranches e Noronha (1694-1746)
- Joao de Nossa Senhora (1746-1760)
- Miguel de Bulhoes e Sousa (1761-1779)
- Lourenco de Lancastre (1780-1790)
- Manuel de Aguiar (1790-1815)
- Joao Inacio de Fonseca Manso (1818-1834)
- Guilherme Henriques de Carvalho (1843-1845)
- Manuel José da Costa (1846-1851)
- Joaquim Ferreira Ferraz (1852-1873)
- José Alves Correia da Silva (1920-1957)
- João Pereira Venâncio, O.R.C. (1958-1972)
- Alberto Cosme do Amaral (1972-1984)

=== Bishops of Leiria-Fatima ===
- Alberto Cosme do Amaral (13 May 1984 – 2 February 1993)
- Serafim de Sousa Ferreira e Silva (2 February 1993 – 22 April 2006)
- António Augusto dos Santos Marto (22 April 2006 – 28 January 2022)
- José Ornelas Carvalho, S.C.I. (28 January 2022 – present)

== See also ==
- List of Catholic dioceses in Portugal
- Basilica of Our Lady of the Rosary (Fátima)
- Basilica of the Holy Trinity (Fátima)
- Our Lady of Fátima
- Sanctuary of Fátima

== Sources and external links ==
- Diocese of Leiria-Fátima – Official website
- GCatholic, with Google map - data for alls sections
