= Ilídio Pinto Leandro =

Portuguese priest (1950–2020)

- Bishop of Viseu
- Church: Catholic Church
- Diocese: Diocese of Viseu
- In office: 10 June 2006 – 3 May 2018
- Predecessor: António Marto
- Successor: António Luciano dos Santos Costa

Orders
- Ordination: 25 December 1973
- Consecration: 23 July 2006 by António Marto

Personal details
- Born: 14 December 1950 Rio de Mel, Viseu District, Portugal
- Died: 21 December 2020 (aged 70) Viseu, Viseu District, Portugal

Ilídio Pinto Leandro (14 December 1950 – 21 February 2020), was a Portuguese Roman Catholic bishop.

Pinto Leandro was born in Portugal and was ordained to the priesthood in 1973. He served as bishop of the Roman Catholic Diocese of Viseu from 2006 until 2018.
