= Basilica of Our Lady of the Rosary (Fátima) =

- Basílica de Nossa Senhora do Rosário
- The iconic facade of the Basilica of Our Lady of the Rosary
- Basilica of Our Lady of the Rosary
- 39.6323°N 8.6718°W
- Location: Santarém, Middle Tagus, Center
- Country: Portugal
- Denomination: Catholic Church
- Website: www.fatima.pt/en/

Architecture
- Architectural type: Baroque Revival

Administration
- Diocese: Diocese of Leiria-Fátima

The Basilica of Our Lady of the Rosary (Portuguese: Basílica de Nossa Senhora do Rosário) is a Roman Catholic church and minor basilica in the Sanctuary of Fátima (Marian Shrine of Our Lady of Fátima) in Cova da Iria, in the civil parish of Fátima, in the municipality of Ourém in Portugal.

== Gallery ==
Façade of the basilica and surrounding colonnades

Nave looking towards the main altar

Main altar and sculpted relief in the apse

Organ above the main entrance

Stained-glass windows and side arcades

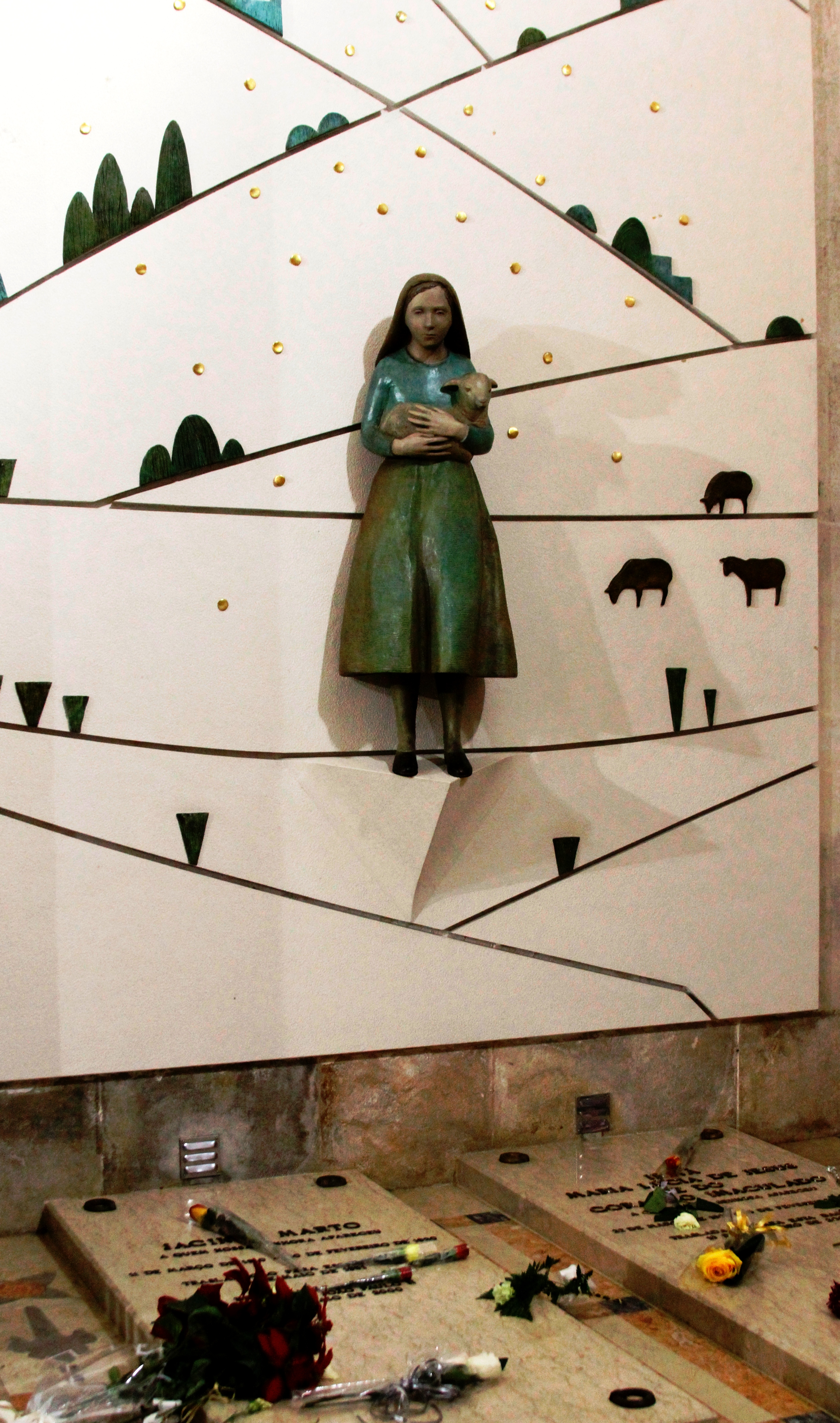
Tombs of Jacinta Marto and Lúcia dos Santos

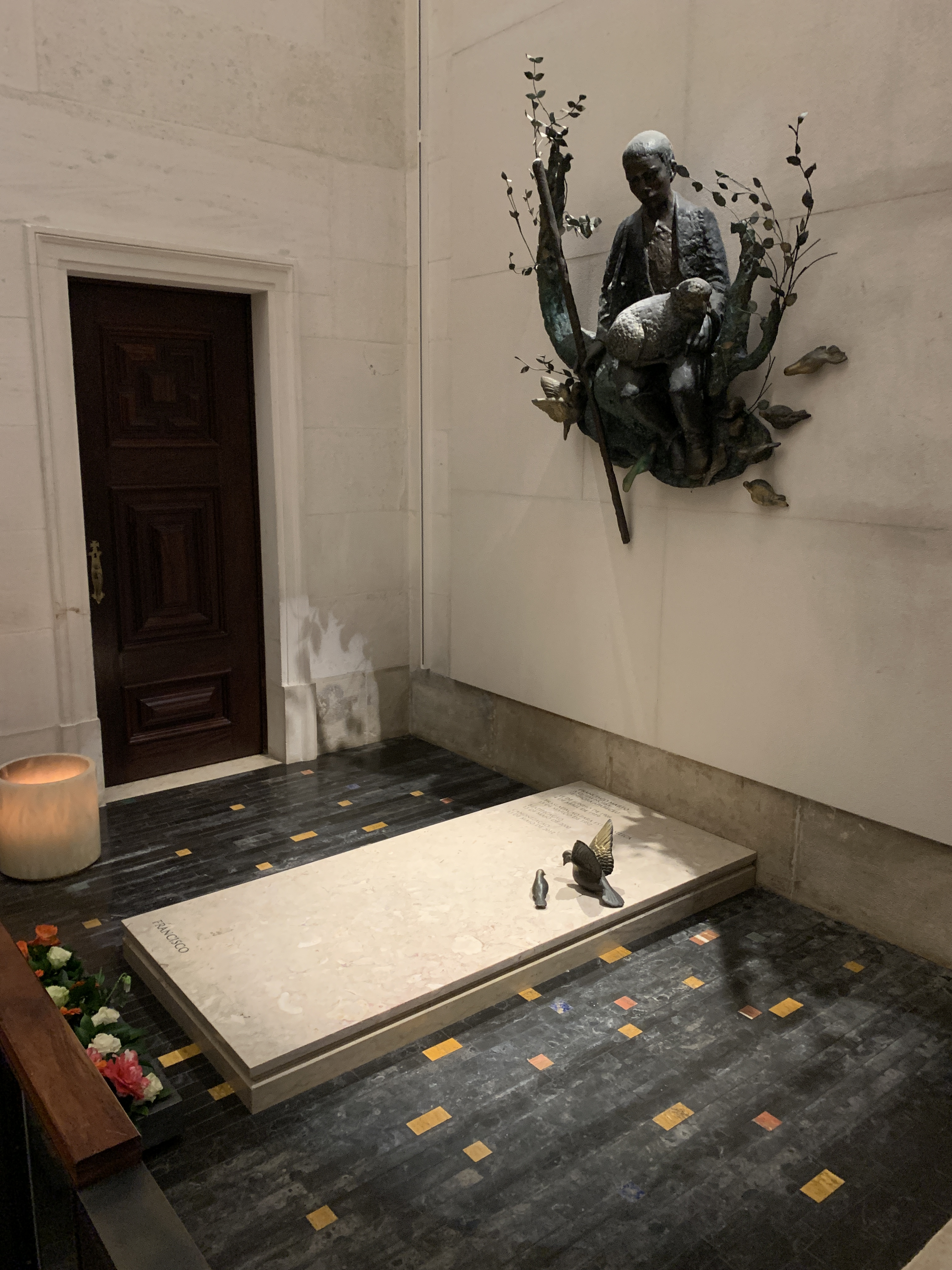
Tomb of Francisco Marto

== See also ==
- Chapel of the Apparitions
- First Saturdays Devotion
