= Angel of Portugal =

Guardian angel

Guardian Angel of Portugal
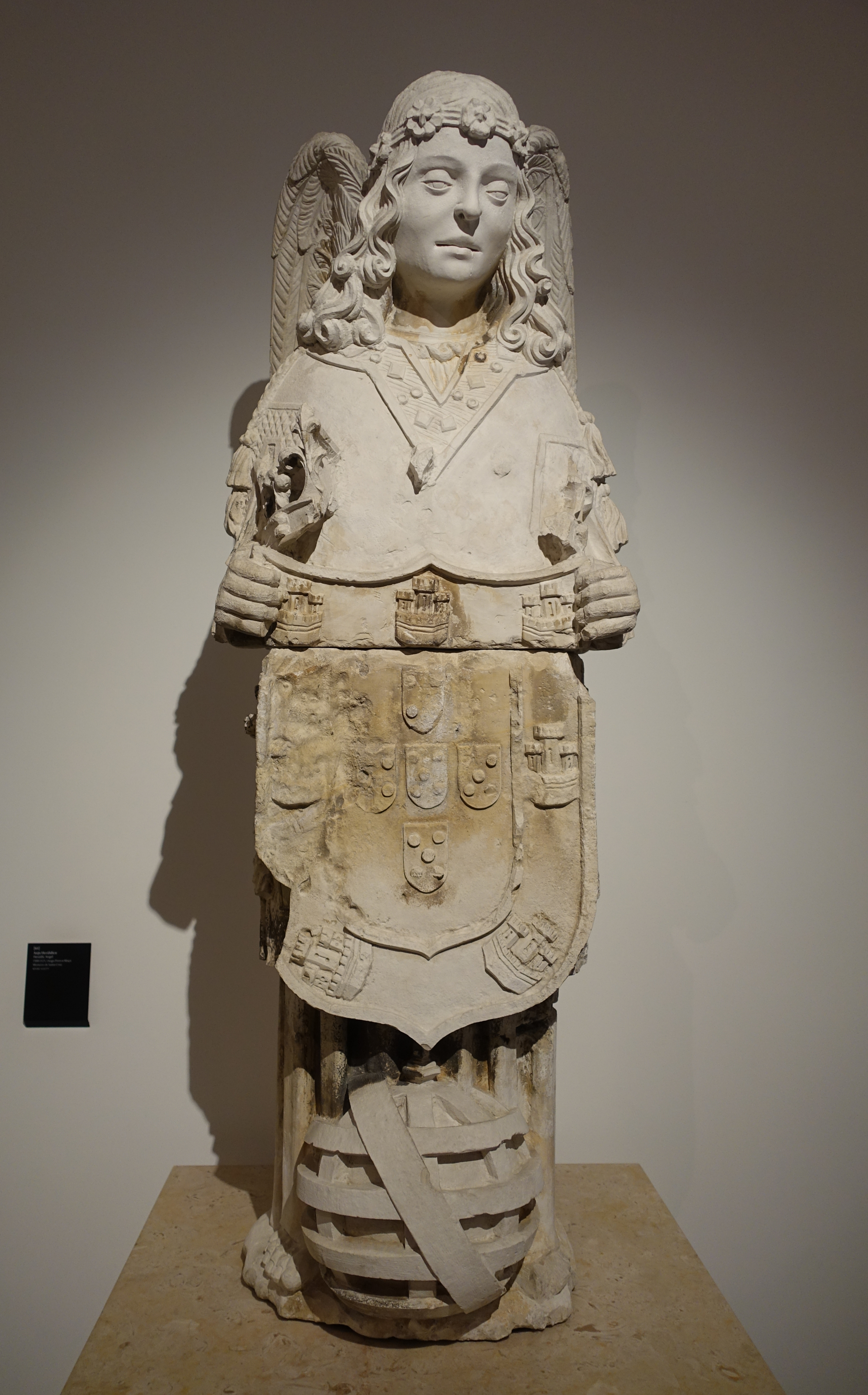
- Stone statue of the Angel of Portugal at Museu Nacional Machado de Castro, in Coimbra, Portugal
- Venerated in: Portugal, Catholic Church
- Major shrine: Sanctuary of Fátima
- Feast: June 10
- Attributes: Archangel carrying the Portuguese Shield
- Patronage: Portugal

The Angel of Portugal (Portuguese: Anjo de Portugal), also referred to as the Guardian Angel of Portugal (Anjo da Guarda de Portugal), the Holy Guardian Angel of Portugal (Santo Anjo da Guarda de Portugal), the Custodian Angel (Anjo Custódio) or the Angel of Peace (Anjo da Paz) is celebrated as the Guardian angel of Portugal. It is the only "national angel" recognised as such. Portugal celebrates the Feast of the Angel of Portugal on 10 June.

== History ==
The east wall of the chapel at the Batalha Monastery, the construction of which commenced in 1386, had an altar dedicated to the Guardian Angel of Portugal. In 1504, by request of King Manuel I of Portugal, Pope Julius II created the feast of the Custodian Angel of the Kingdom (Anjo Custódio do Reino).

The cult of the Guardian Angel of Portugal declined considerably after the 17th century, and was officially restored in 1952, its feast day being inserted into the Portuguese liturgical calendar by Pius XII.

Lúcia dos Santos and her cousins Francisco and Jacinta Marto, the three children who claimed in 1917 to have seen Marian apparitions now titled Our Lady of Fátima, also reported that this angel had visited them three times beforehand in 1916, calling himself the "Angel of Peace". They said he taught them the first two Fátima Prayers, as well as penance, before giving them Holy Communion.

The Angel of Portugal has at times been identified as Saint Michael.

== See also ==
- List of angels in theology
- Michael (archangel)
- Valinhos (Fátima)
