= António Júlio de Castro Fernandes =

Portuguese economist and ideologue of corporatism (1903–1975)

- Born: June 2, 1903; Lisbon, Portugal
- Died: 1975 (aged 71–72)
- Education: Technical University of Lisbon
- Occupation: Sports director
- Awards: Grand Cross of Ordem Militar de Cristo

António Júlio de Castro Fernandes GCC (Lisbon, June 2, 1903 – Lisbon, 1975) was a Portuguese economist, banker, politician and ideologue of corporatism.

He was linked to sectors of the Portuguese extreme right during the transition to the Estado Novo and was one of the most active propagandists of fascist corporatism. He was a leader of the Nun'Álvares National Crusade in the final years of the First Portuguese Republic and one of the founders of the National Unionist Movement (1932). He joined the National Revolution and, among many other important positions, was Undersecretary of State for Corporations and Social Welfare (1944 to 1948) and Minister for the Economy (1948 to 1950) in Oliveira Salazar's government, president of the National Union's executive committee (1958 to 1961 and 1965 to 1968), a member of the National Assembly and a prosecutor in the Corporate Chamber. He dedicated himself to banking, having been a director of Banco Nacional Ultramarino.

== Biography ==
With a degree in economics from the Higher Institute of Economic and Financial Sciences of the Technical University of Lisbon, he was one of the most prominent adherents of his time's extreme right-wing totalitarian ideologies.

He adhered to the ideals of the National Revolution and, with Oliveira Salazar's support, did an internship in Italy before the Second World War, where he studied fascist corporate methods. He was accompanied on his internship by Tullio Cianetti, then Minister for Trade Unions in Benito Mussolini's government and a member of the Fascist Grand Council, with whom he became great friends and, in his own words, a brother. (Note: Tullio Cianetti took refuge in Mozambique after the Second World War, establishing himself as an industrialist and dying there in 1976)

A member and leader of the National Union, his internship resulted in the book O Corporativismo Fascista [Fascist Corporatism], published in 1938, beginning a journey through the corporatist system that would shape his career. He was an attorney for the Corporative Chamber (I, VII, VIII, X and XI legislatures), a member of parliament, Undersecretary of State for Corporations and Social Welfare (1944–1948), Minister for the Economy (1948–1950) and administrator, deputy governor and governor of the Banco Nacional Ultramarino (1951–1974).

On August 26, 1950, he was awarded the Grand Cross of the Military Order of Our Lord Jesus Christ.

He was president of the General Assembly of the Os Belenenses Football Club between 1962 and 1964.

== Published works ==
He left a vast body of work scattered throughout periodicals, various speeches, and monographs, including:

- Patronato e Sindicatos Nacionais (Employers and National Unions), 1934
- Algumas Palavras (Some words), 1937
- O Corporativismo Fascista (Fascist Corporatism), 1938
- Temas Corporativos (Corporate Themes), 1944
- A Organização das Horas Livres (Organizing Free Time), 1944
- Princípios Fundamentais da Organização Corporativa Portuguesa Fundamental (Principles of Portuguese Corporate Organization), 1944
- A Revolução Social Portuguesa (The Portuguese Social Revolution), 1945
- Casas do Povo (People's Houses), 1945
- Enfrentando o Destino das Casas do Povo (Facing the Fate of the People's Houses), 1947
- A Segurança dos Trabalhadores Através do Seguro Social (Workers' Security through Social Security), 1947
- A Presença de Portugal em África (Portugal's presence in Africa), 1960
- Três Ciprestes (Three Cypresses), 1971
- Arquivo (Archive), 1972
- Le Mouvement «Travail et Joie» au Portugal (The "Work and Joy" Movement in Portugal)

== See also ==
- Ordem Militar de Cristo
- Tullio Cianetti
- Corporative Chamber
