= Valinhos (Fátima) =

Coordinates: 39°37′06″N 08°40′12″W

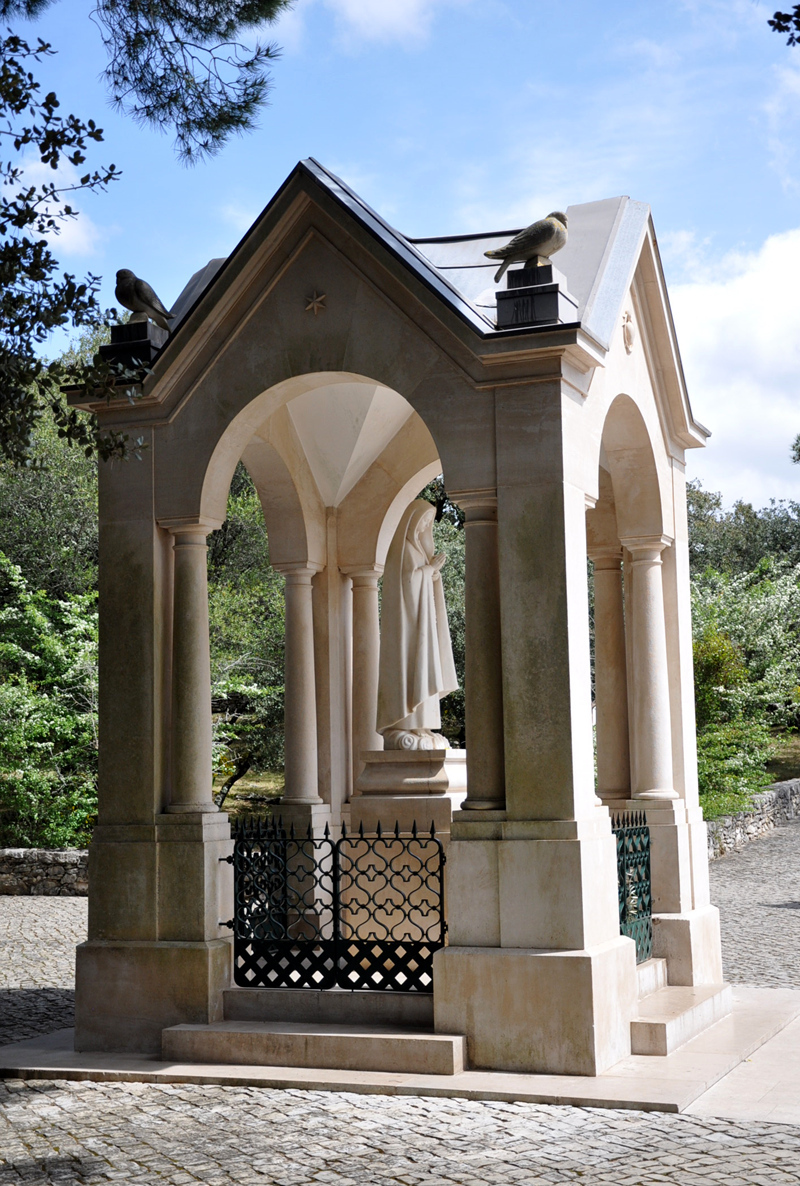
Our Lady's monument in Valinhos.

Valinhos is a countryside place on the outskirts of Fátima, Portugal. This place became famous for the 19 August 1917 apparition of Our Lady of Fátima and by the 1st and 3rd apparitions of the Guardian Angel of Portugal (also named the Angel of Peace). As such, it is a popular site for religious tourism.

== Points of interest ==
In Valinhos, there are points of interest such as the Via Sacra or Caminho dos Pastorinhos (path of the little shepherds), which takes pilgrims along 14 chapels that represent the different stations of the Way of the Cross. The Via Sacra begins at Rotunda Sul and ends at the Hungarian Calvary (Calvário Húngaro), where there is a chapel dedicated to St. Stephen. 14 of the 15 stations were donated by Hungarian refugees.

Between the 8th and 9th station of the Via Sacra, there is the place where the fourth apparition of Our Lady, on August 19, 1917, is said to have occurred. The Loca do Anjo is the place where the apparitions of the Angel to the visionaries are said to have taken place; a sculpture now marks the spot.

== Guardian Angel of Portugal ==
Guardian Angel of Portugal
- Venerated in: Portugal, Catholic Church
- Major shrine: Sanctuary of Fátima
- Feast: June 10
- Attributes: Archangel carrying the Portuguese Shield
- Patronage: Portugal

The Guardian Angel of Portugal (Portuguese: Anjo da Guarda de Portugal) is also referred to as the Angel of Portugal (Anjo de Portugal), the Holy Guardian Angel of Portugal (Santo Anjo da Guarda de Portugal), the Custodian Angel (Anjo Custódio) or the Angel of Peace (Anjo da Paz). Portugal celebrates the feast of "the Angel of Portugal" on June 10.

Construction began on Batalha Monastery in 1386. The east wall of the chapel had an altar dedicated to the Guardian Angel of Portugal. In 1504, by request of King Manuel I of Portugal, Pope Julius II created the feast of the Custodian Angel of the Kingdom (Anjo Custódio do Reino), whose cult would already be ancient in Portugal.

Devotion to the Guardian Angel of Portugal almost disappeared after the 17th century but was restored in 1952, being inserted into the Portuguese Liturgical Calendar by Pius XII.

== Apparitions, 1916 ==
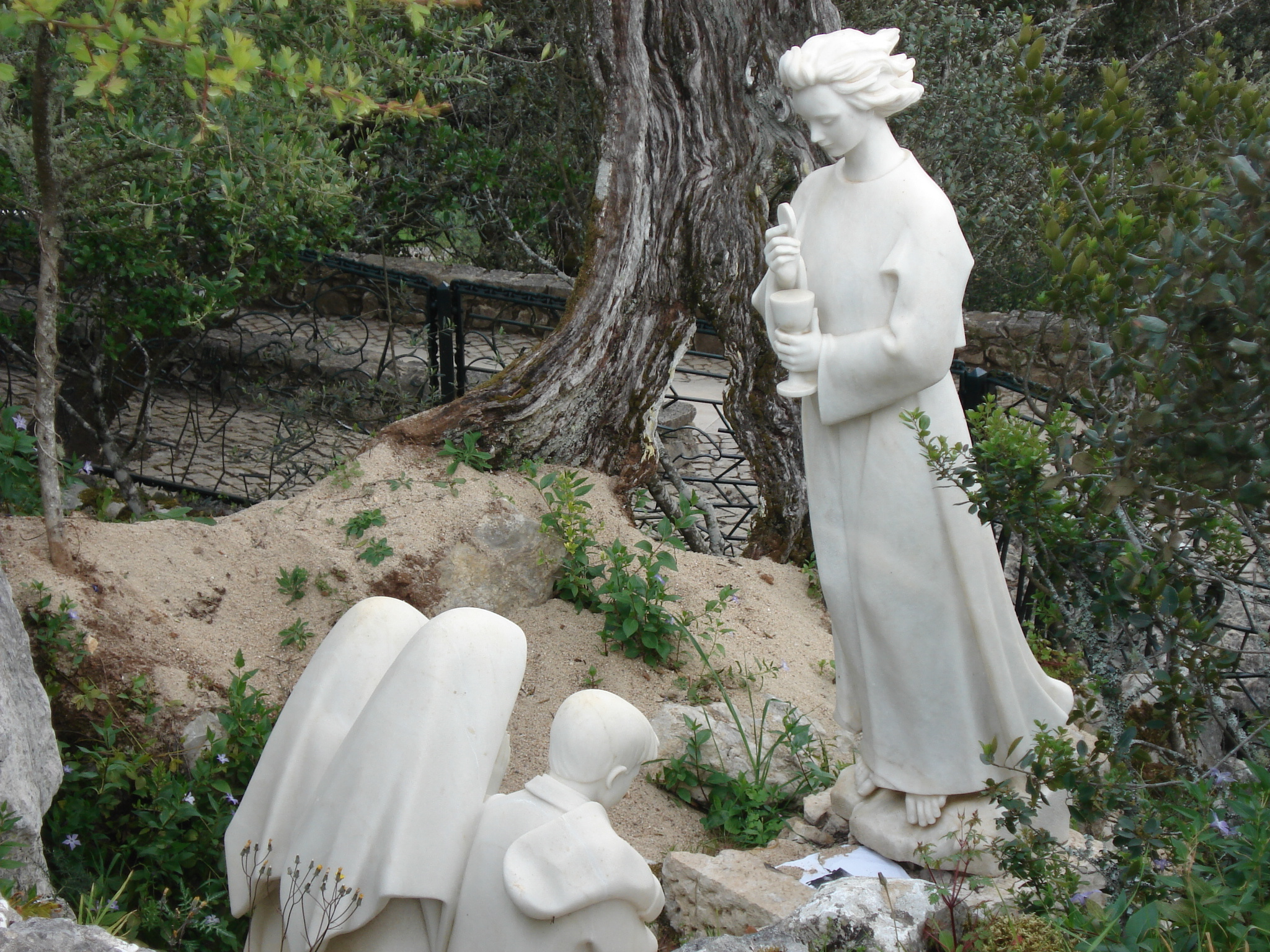
Representation of the Angel of Portugal (or Angel of Peace) in the apparitions to the three children in Fátima.

In her Memoirs, the Portuguese Carmelite nun Sister Lúcia, seer of Our Lady of Fátima, tells that, between April and October, 1916, an angel appeared three times to her and to Francisco and Jacinta Marto, in Fátima, Portugal, inviting them to prayer and penitence. The angel identified himself as "the Angel of Peace" and "your country['s] ... Angel Guardian, the Angel of Portugal."

The children said the Angel of Peace taught them two prayers, the Theological Prayer and the Trinitarian Prayer.

== See also ==
- Chapel of the Apparitions
- Parish Church of Fátima
- Sanctuary of Fátima
- Wax Museum of Fátima
