= Corporative Chamber =

Former parliamentary chamber in Portugal

Corporative Chamber Câmara Corporativa

History
- Founded: April 11, 1933
- Disbanded: April 25, 1974; 51 years ago
- Preceded by: Congress of the Republic
- Succeeded by: Constituent Assembly

Leadership
- President of the Corporate Chamber: Eduardo Augusto Marques (1935–1944) (first); Mário Júlio de Almeida Costa (1973–1974) (last)

Elections
- First election: December 16, 1934
- Last election: October 28, 1973

Meeting place
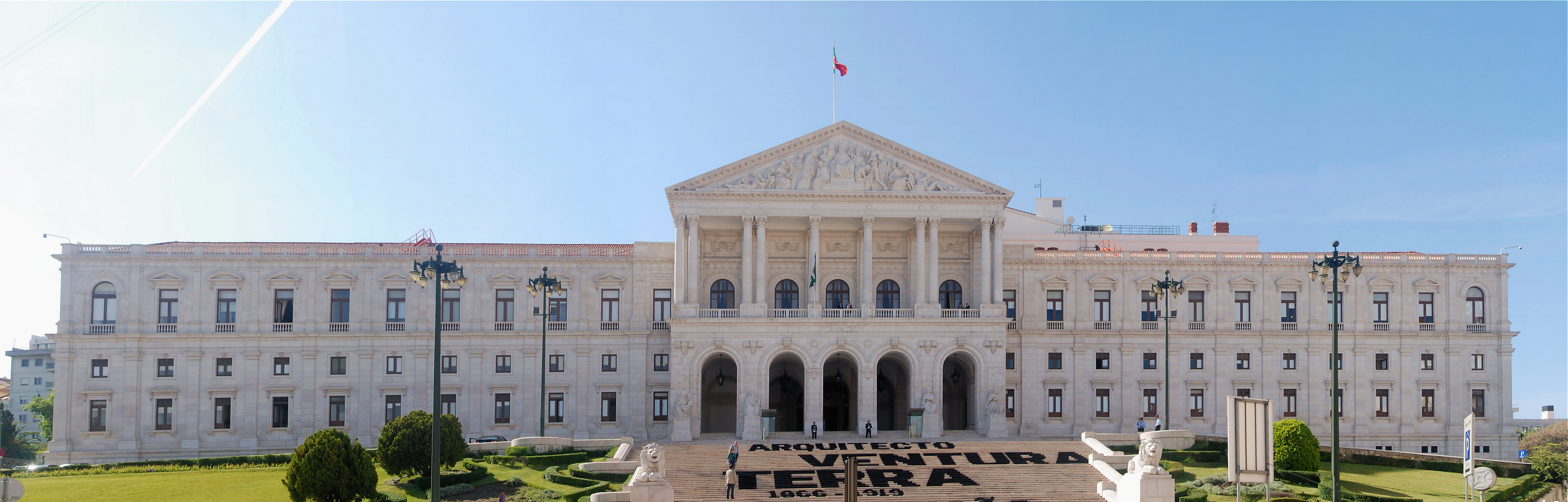
- São Bento Palace, Lisbon

Constitution
- Portuguese Constitution of 1933

The Corporative Chamber (Portuguese: Câmara Corporativa) was one of the two parliamentary chambers established under the Portuguese Constitution of 1933, the other being the National Assembly. Unlike the directly elected National Assembly, it had a purely consultative, rather than legislative role.

The creation of the Corporative Chamber was part of corporatist philosophy advocated by Salazar and adopted by the Estado Novo. Its function was to represent the various economic, cultural, social, and other corporations.

The Corporative Chamber met in the former Senate chamber of the São Bento Palace. It was composed of members elected by the various types of Portuguese corporations, including:

- Provinces and Municipalities;
- Universities and Schools;
- Trade Unions;
- Economic Organizations and Employers;
- Social Welfare Organizations.

== Presidents ==
The presidents of the Corporative Chamber were the following from 1935 to 1974:

Term	No.	Portrait	Name (Birth–Death)	Term of office			Political party
Term	No.	Portrait	Name (Birth–Death)	Took office	Left office	Time in office	Political party
I	1		Eduardo Augusto Marques (1867–1944)	10 January 1935	10 June 1944	9 years, 152 days	National Union
II	1		Eduardo Augusto Marques (1867–1944)	10 January 1935	10 June 1944	9 years, 152 days	National Union
III	1		Eduardo Augusto Marques (1867–1944)	10 January 1935	10 June 1944	9 years, 152 days	National Union
III	2		Domingos Fezas Vital (1888–1953)	25 November 1944	25 November 1946	2 years, 0 days	National Union
IV	2		Domingos Fezas Vital (1888–1953)	25 November 1944	25 November 1946	2 years, 0 days	National Union
IV	3		José Gabriel Pinto Coelho (1886–1978)	25 November 1946	25 November 1949	3 years, 0 days	National Union
V	4		Marcelo Caetano (1906–1980)	25 November 1949	8 July 1955	5 years, 225 days	National Union
VI	4		Marcelo Caetano (1906–1980)	25 November 1949	8 July 1955	5 years, 225 days	National Union
VI	5		João Pinto da Costa Leite (1905–1975)	28 November 1955	28 November 1957	2 years, 0 days	National Union
VII	6		Luís Supico Pinto (1909–1990)	28 November 1957	16 November 1973	15 years, 353 days	National Union (renamed People's National Action in 1970)
VIII	6		Luís Supico Pinto (1909–1990)	28 November 1957	16 November 1973	15 years, 353 days	National Union (renamed People's National Action in 1970)
IX	6		Luís Supico Pinto (1909–1990)	28 November 1957	16 November 1973	15 years, 353 days	National Union (renamed People's National Action in 1970)
X	6		Luís Supico Pinto (1909–1990)	28 November 1957	16 November 1973	15 years, 353 days	National Union (renamed People's National Action in 1970)
XI	7		Mário Júlio de Almeida Costa (1927-2025)	16 November 1973	25 April 1974	160 days	People's National Action

== See also ==
- Chamber of Fasces and Corporations
- António Júlio de Castro Fernandes
