= Pupilos do Exército =

Coordinates: 38.7475°N 9.1842°W

Institute of the Pupils of the Army
- Instituto dos Pupilos do Exército
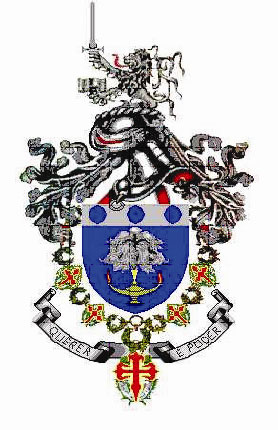
- Motto: Querer é poder
- Motto in English: "Willing is power" or "Where there's a will there's a way"
- Type: Military academy
- Established: 1911
- Director: Colonel João A. M. Soares
- Location: Lisbon, Portugal
- Campus: Benfica
- Nickname: Pilões
- Website: Official website

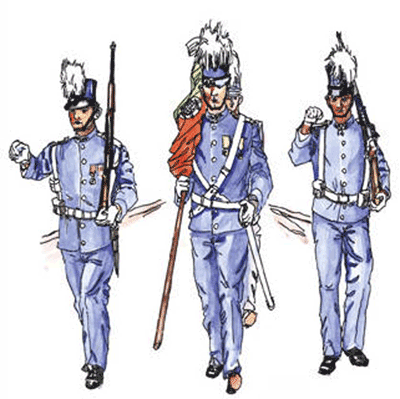
Dress uniforms of the students of the Pupilos do Exército.

The Pupilos do Exército (Portuguese for "pupils of the Army") is military vocational education school of Portugal. Presently, its complete official name is Instituto dos Pupilos do Exército (IPE, Institute of the Pupils of the Army).

Pupilos do Exército offers Basic (2nd and 3rd cycles) and Secondary Education programmes, in the boarding school (only for young males) and in the day school (for both sexes) systems. Despite operating under the supervision of the Portuguese Army, its Education programmes are considered official for all purposes, by the Portuguese Ministry of Education.

Until 2009, Pupilos do Exército had a higher education section that offered bachelor degree programmes in Mechanical, Electronics and Electrical Engineering and in Accounting, but now this section is extinct.

== History ==
The Pupilos do Exército were created on 25 May 1911 by decree of the War minister, General António Xavier Correia Barreto, as the Instituto Profissional dos Pupilos do Exército de Terra e Mar (Professional Institute of the Pupils of the Army of Land and Sea), usually being referred to just as Instituto Profissional dos Pupilos do Exército.

At that time, it was designed mainly to provide vocational education to children of soldiers of enlisted rank. By contrast, the Colégio Militar (Military College) was reserved for the children of commissioned officers.

In 1959, it was renamed Instituto Técnico Militar dos Pupilos do Exército (Military Technical Institute of the Pupils of the Army). In 1976, it was renamed again, becoming the Instituto Militar dos Pupilos do Exército (Military Institute of the Pupils of the Army). Finally, in 2009, it became the Instituto dos Pupilos do Exército.
