= Sanctuary of Fátima =

- Sanctuary of Our Lady of Fátima
- Santuário de Fátima
- The Basilica of Our Lady of the Rosary and the sanctuary square
- Sanctuary of Fátima
- 39°37′55.67″N 8°40′18.43″W
- Location: Cova da Iria, Fátima, Beira Litoral
- Country: Portugal
- Website: www.fatima.pt/en/

History
- Dedication: Marian apparition in the civil parish of Fátima, Portugal.

Architecture
- Architect: Gerardus van Krieken
- Style: Neobaroque

Administration
- Diocese: Roman Catholic Diocese of Leiria-Fátima

The Sanctuary of Fátima (Portuguese: Santuário de Fátima), or Shrine of Fátima, also known as Sanctuary of Our Lady of Fátima (Portuguese: Santuário de Nossa Senhora de Fátima), is a group of Catholic Church religious buildings and structures located in Cova da Iria, in the civil parish and city of Fátima, in the municipality of Ourém, in Portugal. The sanctuary is dedicated to the 1917 Marian apparitions of Our Lady of Fátima.

In addition to the Basilica of Our Lady of the Rosary (Portuguese: Basílica de Nossa Senhora do Rosário), the shrine consists of the Chapel of the Lausperene (Portuguese: Capela do Lausperene), a great oak tree (near which the 1917 Marian apparitions occurred), a monument to the Sacred Heart of Jesus (Portuguese: Monumento ao Sagrado Coração de Jesus) and the Chapel of the Apparitions (Portuguese: Capelinha das Aparições), where three children, Lúcia Santos and her cousins, Jacinta and Francisco Marto, said they were first visited by the Virgin Mary. In addition, several other structures and monuments were built in the intervening years to commemorate the events.

Across from the main sanctuary is the much larger Basilica of the Most Holy Trinity constructed after 1953, owing to the limited scale of the Sanctuary for large-scale pilgrimages and religious services.

== History ==
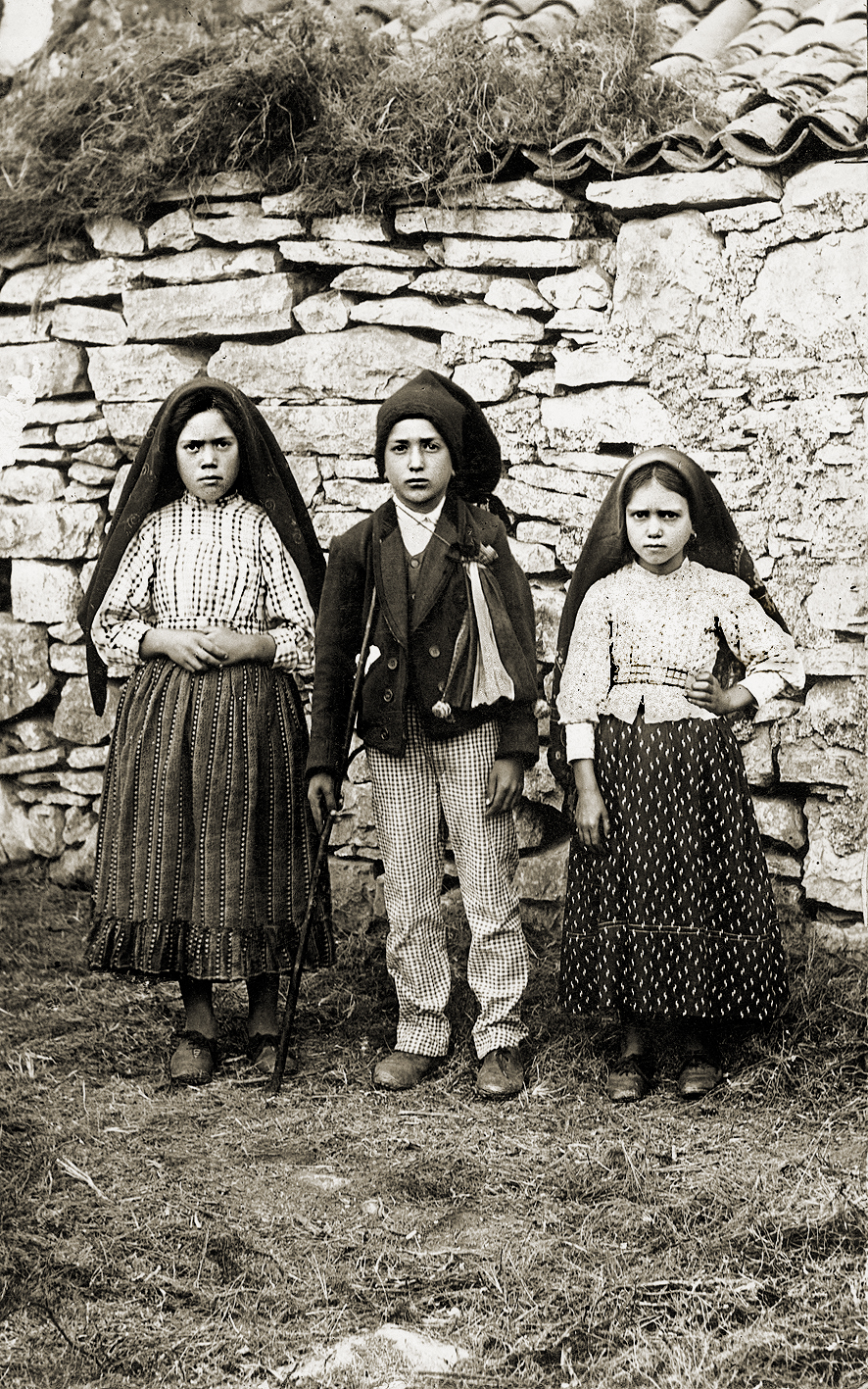
Lúcia Santos (left) with her cousins Francisco and Jacinta Marto, 1917.

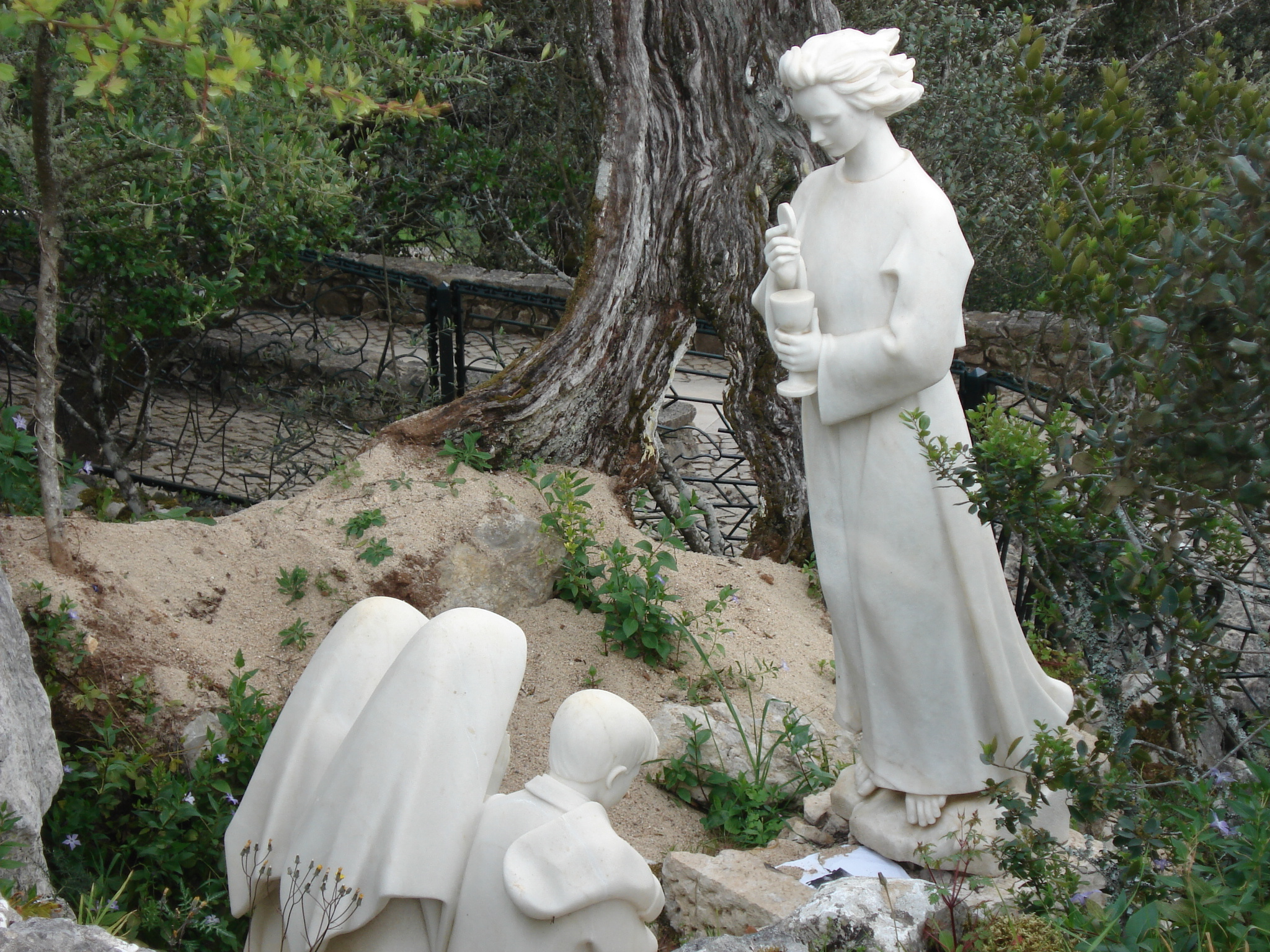
Monument of the Guardian Angel of Portugal apparition to the three little shepherd children of Fátima, Portugal.

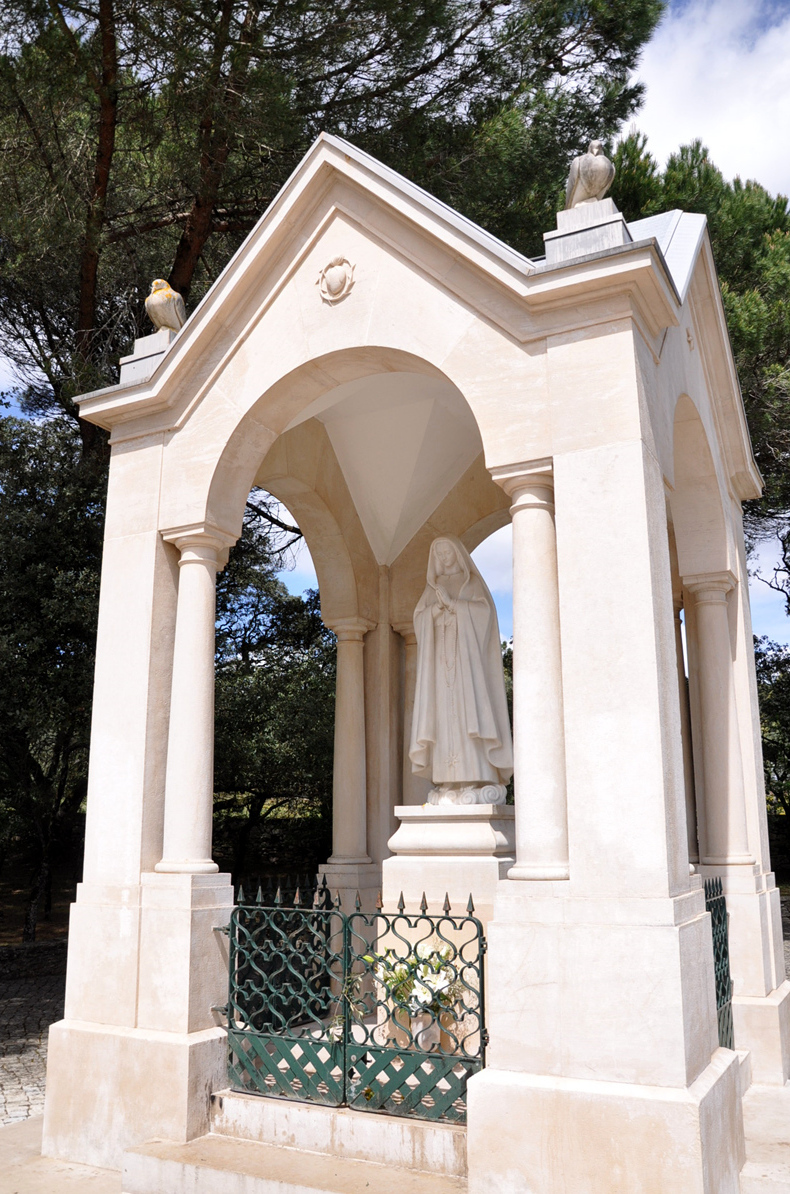
Statue dedicated to the apparition of Our Lady which occurred exceptionally in Valinhos, near Fátima, Portugal.

In 1916, on three occasions, Lúcia Santos and her two cousins, Francisco and Jacinta Marto, began reporting apparitions of an angel in the region of Valinhos. These alleged visitations began on the 13 May 1917 when, while tending their family's sheep in Cova da Iria, they said they witnessed the apparition of what they later assumed was the Virgin Mary, and began doing penance and self-sacrifice to atone for sinners. Many flocked to Fátima and Aljustrel to witness these alleged apparitions along with the children, but not before the children were jailed for being politically disruptive. These visitations culminated on the 13 October 1917 public Miracle of the Sun event, as the apparition of Virgin Mary allegedly divulged three secrets to the children. Although the Miracle of the Sun marked the children's last claimed apparition, the region of Fátima continued to be a destination for pilgrims.

Victims of the 1918 flu pandemic epidemic, both cousins (Francisco and Jacinta Marto) died on 4 April 1919 and 20 February 1920 (in Aljustrel and Lisbon), respectively. Along with the Three Secrets of Fátima, their stories (and that of Lúcia), would be linked to religious construction that followed in Fátima. A small chapel, the Capelinha das Aparições (Chapel of the Apparitions) was started on 28 April 1919 by local people: its construction was neither hindered or encouraged by church authorities.

On 13 May 1920, pilgrims defied government troops to install a statue of the Virgin Mary in the chapel, while the first officially celebrated mass occurred on 13 October 1921. A hostel for the sick was also opened in the same year, but the original chapel was destroyed on 6 March 1922.

The first investigations (canonical process) by the Roman Catholic Church in regards to the events at Fátima began on 3 May 1922. Meanwhile, the small Chapel of the Appariations was rebuilt and functioning by 1923. It would take the next four years to see a change in attitude from the Roman Catholic church; on 26 July 1927, the Bishop of Leiria presided over the first religious service at Cova da Iria, that included the blessing of the 11 kilometres (6.8 mi) stations of the cross on the mountain road to the site from Reguengo do Fetal.

On 13 May 1928, the first foundation stone was laid in the construction of the basilica and colonnade of Fátima, a process that continued until 1954. The construction of the colonnade, by architect António Lino began in 1949 and extended to 1954. Meanwhile, on 13 October 1930, the Roman Catholic Church permitted the existence of the first cult of Nossa Senhora de Fátima (Our Lady of Fátima). Even before the completion of the complex, the mortal remains of Jacinta Marto was moved from her modest grave in Vila Nova de Ourém (where she had been buried following her death) to Fátima (12 September 1935), and later (on 1 May 1951) to the completed basilica sanctuary. Her brother's remains were moved from the cemetery in Fátima to the basilica on 13 March 1952. An organ was also mounted that same year in the completed church, by the firm Fratelli Rufatti of Pádua.

Before this period, on 13 May 1942, a large pilgrimage had already marked the 25th anniversary of the apparitions. Two years later (on 13 May 1946), Cardinal Massella, Pontifical Legate, crowned the image of Our Lady of Fátima in the Chapel of the Apparitions, marking a complete reversal in the official posture of the Vatican See towards the events at Fátima. On 7 October 1953 the Church of the Sanctuary of Fátima was consecrated, and within a year, Pope Pius XII conceded the church the title of Basilica in his short Luce Superna document (November 1954).

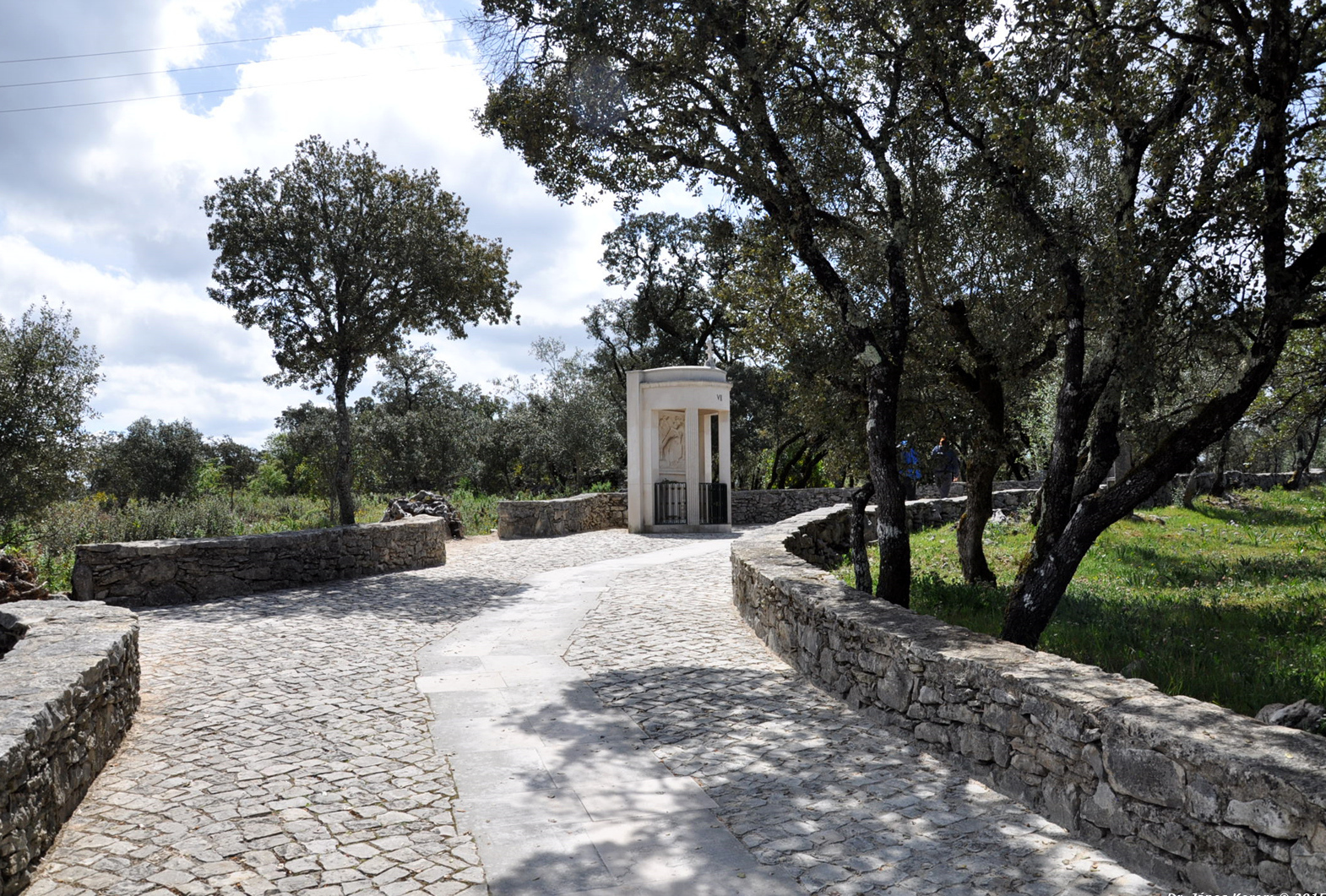
In Valinhos, the Way of the Cross.

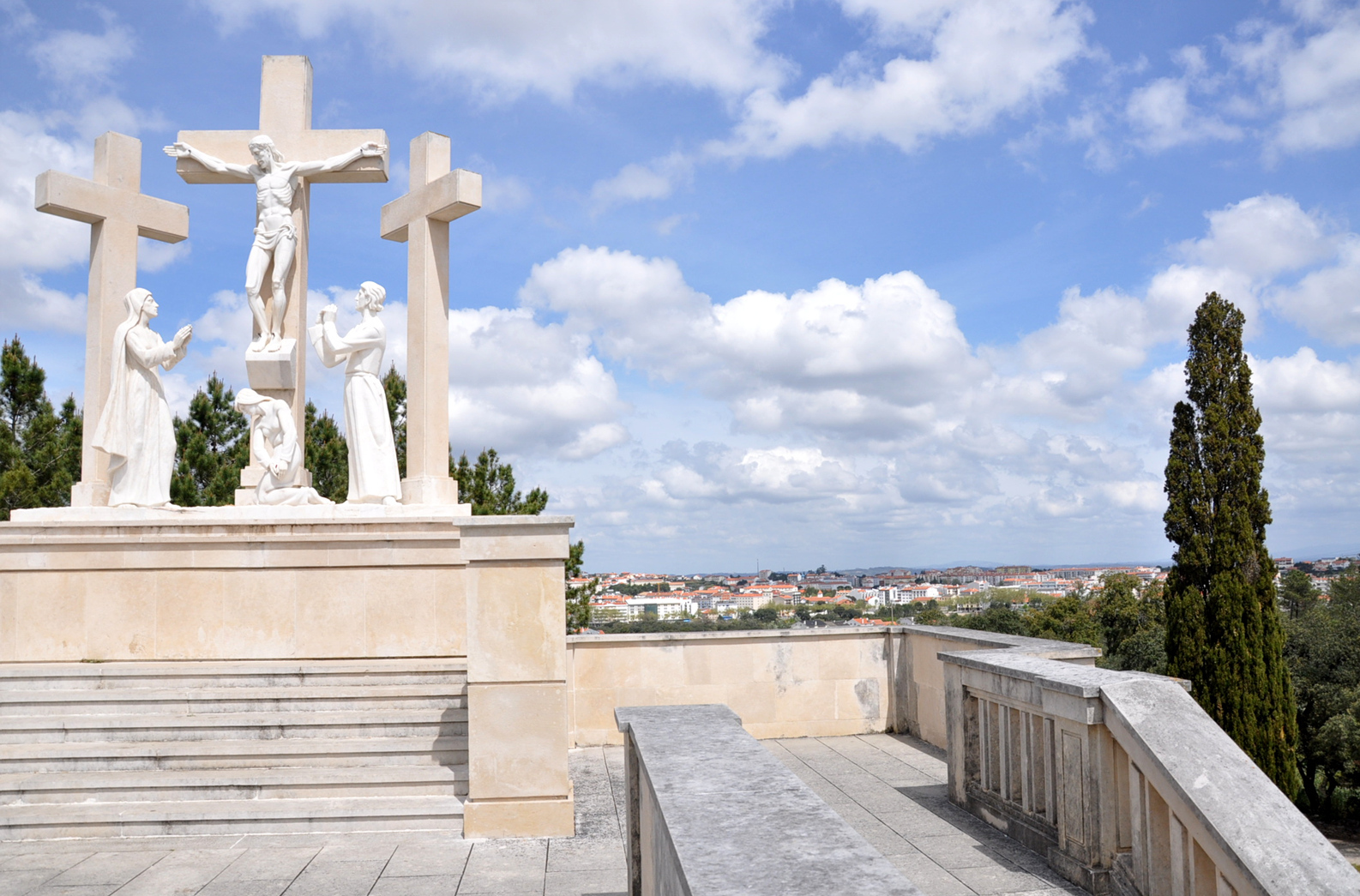
The Calvary in Fátima, Portugal

On 13 May 1956, cardinal Angelo Roncalli, patriarch of Venice and future Pope John XXIII, presided over an international pilgrimage anniversary. From this point forward, there would continue to be an active presence and influence of the patriarchy of the Vatican in the events at Fátima. On 1 January 1960, the sacred Lausperene rite was initiated.

The sections of the organ, until this time dispersed throughout the basilica, were united in one unit in 1962, in the high choir.

On 13 May 1967, Pope Paul VI visited Fátima to mark the 50th anniversary of the first apparitions.

On 19 September 1977, the civil parish was elevated to the status of town.

Between 12–13 May 1982, in a pilgrimage to Fátima by Pope John Paul II, the first cornerstone of the Capela do Sagrado Lausperene was laid: the construction would continue until 1987. Its completion and consecration on 1 January 1987 was attributed to donations and gifts from the Austrian association Cruzada de Reparação pelo Rosário para a Paz no Mundo (Rosary Repair Crusade for World Peace). Pope John Paul II would return once more on 12–13 May 1991 to preside over the international pilgrimage anniversary.

On 4 June 1997, the Portuguese Assembly of the Republic elevated the town of Fátima to the status of city.

Following several years of building, on 24 August 2006 the first attempts to classify the sanctuary as a national patrimony were begun, in terms of the transitory regime, but was incomplete due to a sunset clause of 8 September 2001.

The shrine attracts a large number of Roman Catholic pilgrims, from Portugal and all around the world every year. This international stature gave Fátima the title of "Shrine of the World". Every year pilgrims fill the country roads that leads to the shrine with crowds that approach one million on May 13 and October 13, the most significant dates of the Fátima apparitions. Overall, about four million pilgrims visit the basilica every year.

On January 28, Storm Kristin caused an estimated damage of more than €2 million, as more than 500 medium and large trees were destroyed at the Sanctuary of Fátima.

== Architecture ==
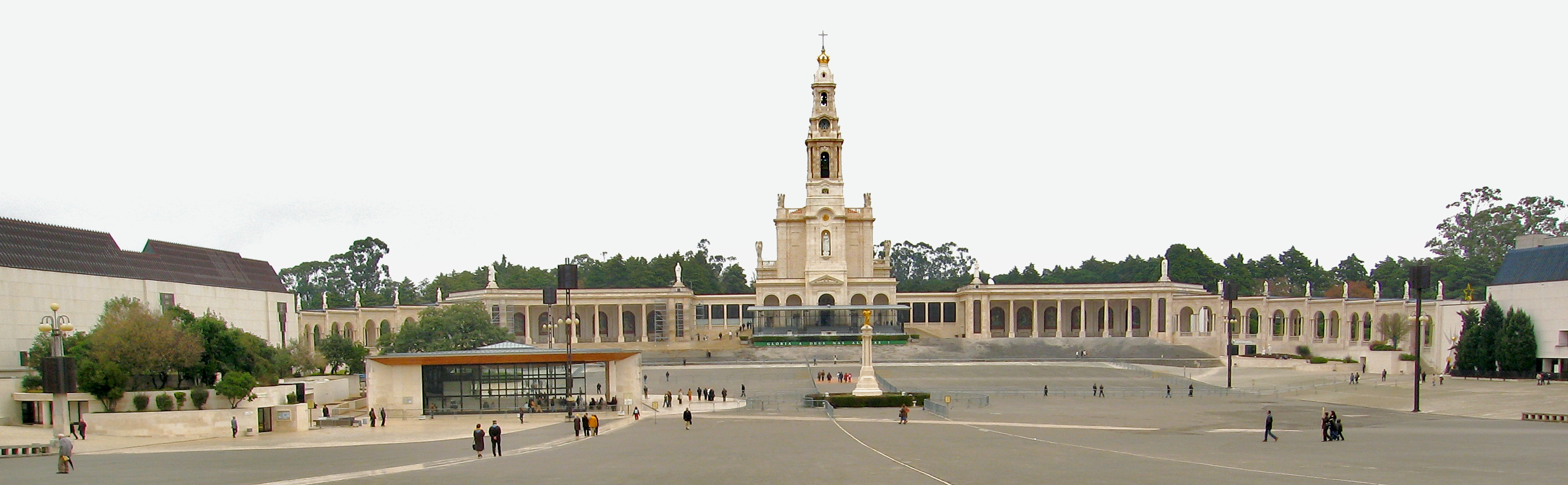
A panoramic view of the Basilica of Our Lady of the Rosary and its colonnade, the Sacred Heart of Jesus statue and the famous Chapel of the Apparitions of Fátima, Portugal

The Sanctuary at Fátima was constructed over time in or near the area of Cova da Iria, where the three children witnessed the Marian apparitions of Our Lady of the Rosary (later known as Our Lady of Fátima by parishioners and pilgrims). The sanctuary includes various buildings, shrines and monuments to the religious, political and social consequences of the event, dispersed throughout a complex of open panoramas and vistas dominated by the Basilica of Our Lady of the Rosary and the Basilica of the Holy Trinity. Central to the complex is the small Chapel of the Apparitions and its shelter, where legend suggests many of the events of the apparitions took place and where the first pilgrims venerated the Marian apparitions.

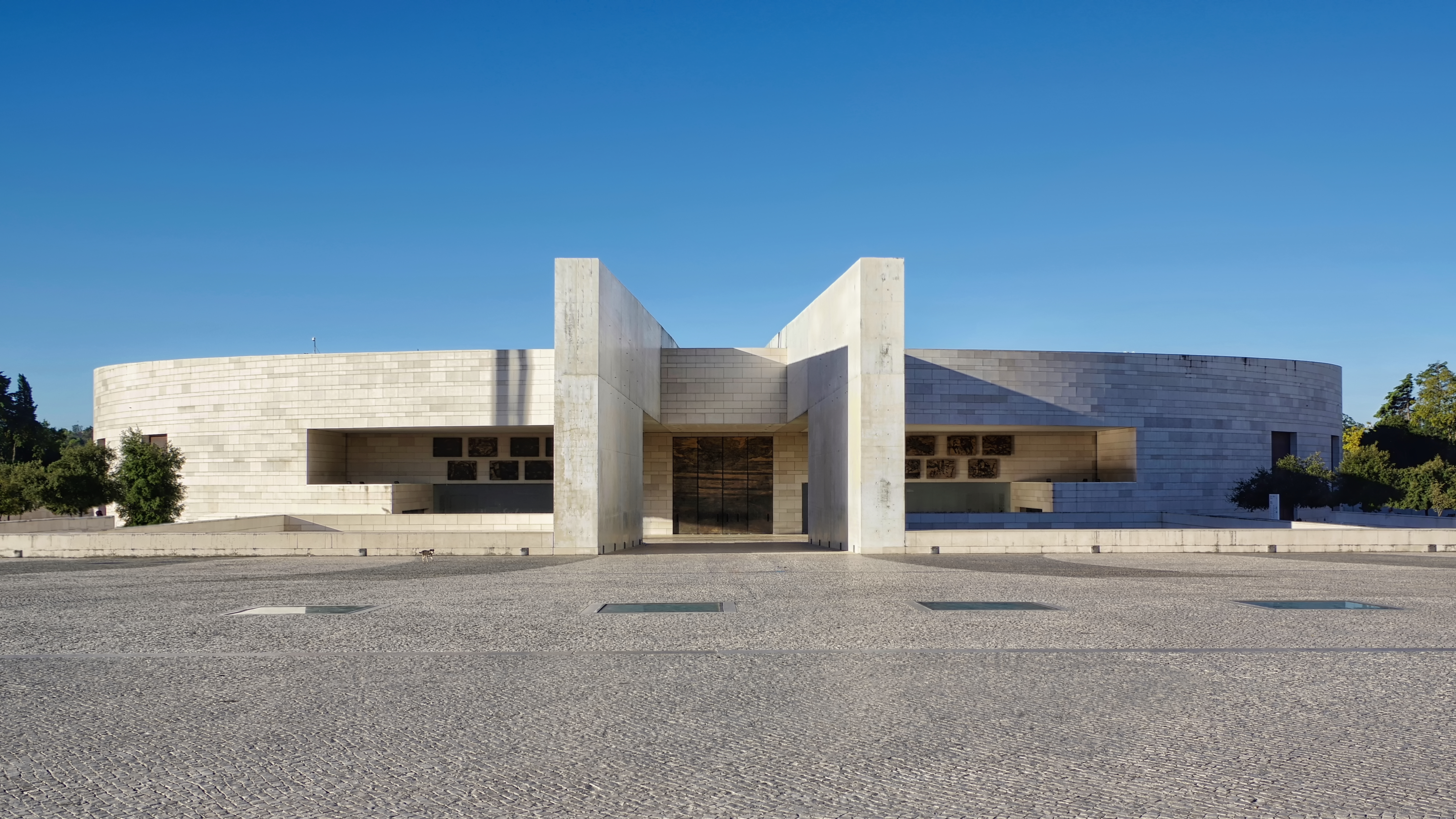
Exterior of the Basilica of the Holy Trinity

=== Basilica of Our Lady of the Rosary ===
Façade and bell tower of the Basilica of Our Lady of the Rosary

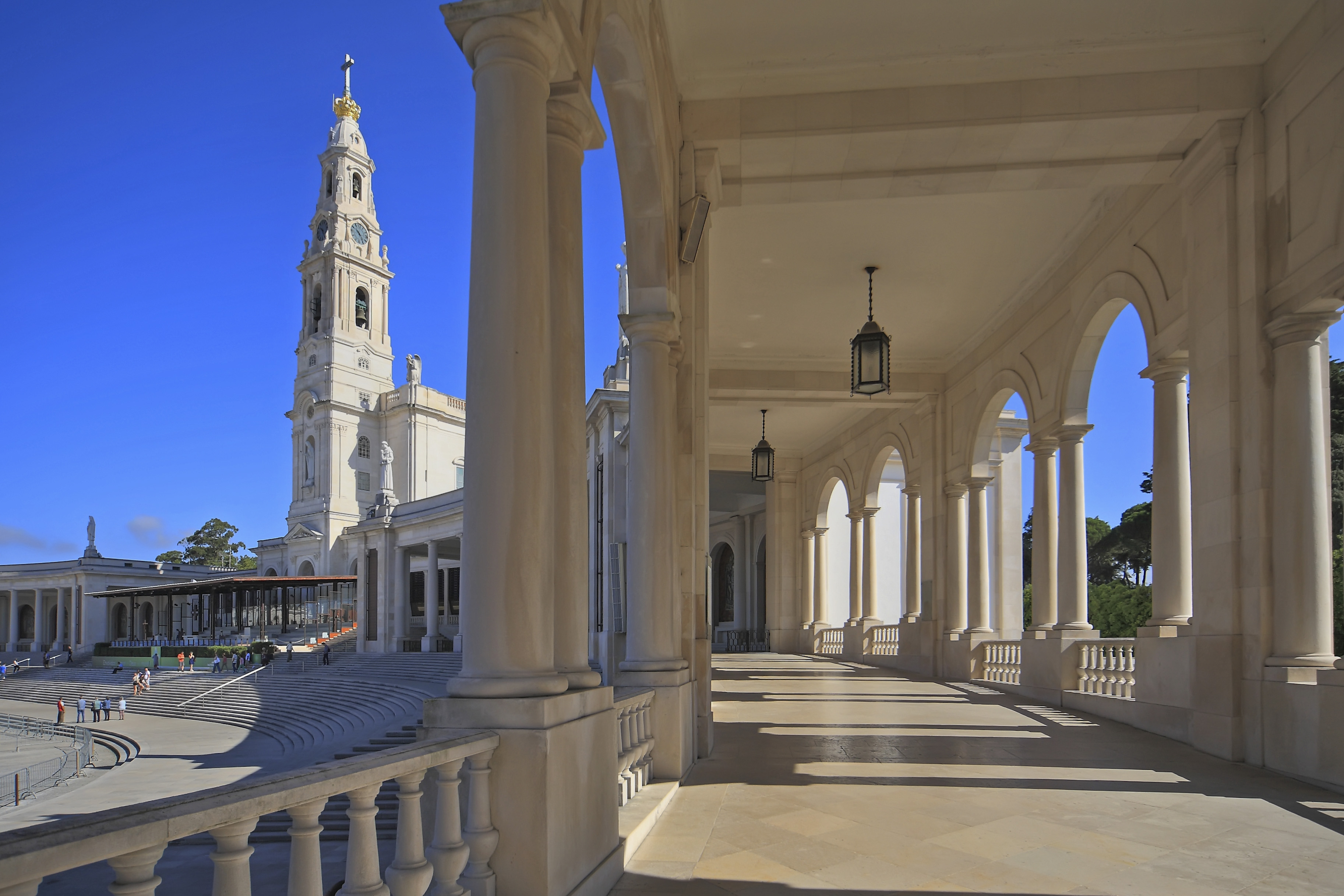
Colonnade beside the Basilica of Our Lady of the Rosary

Interior of the Basilica of Our Lady of the Rosary

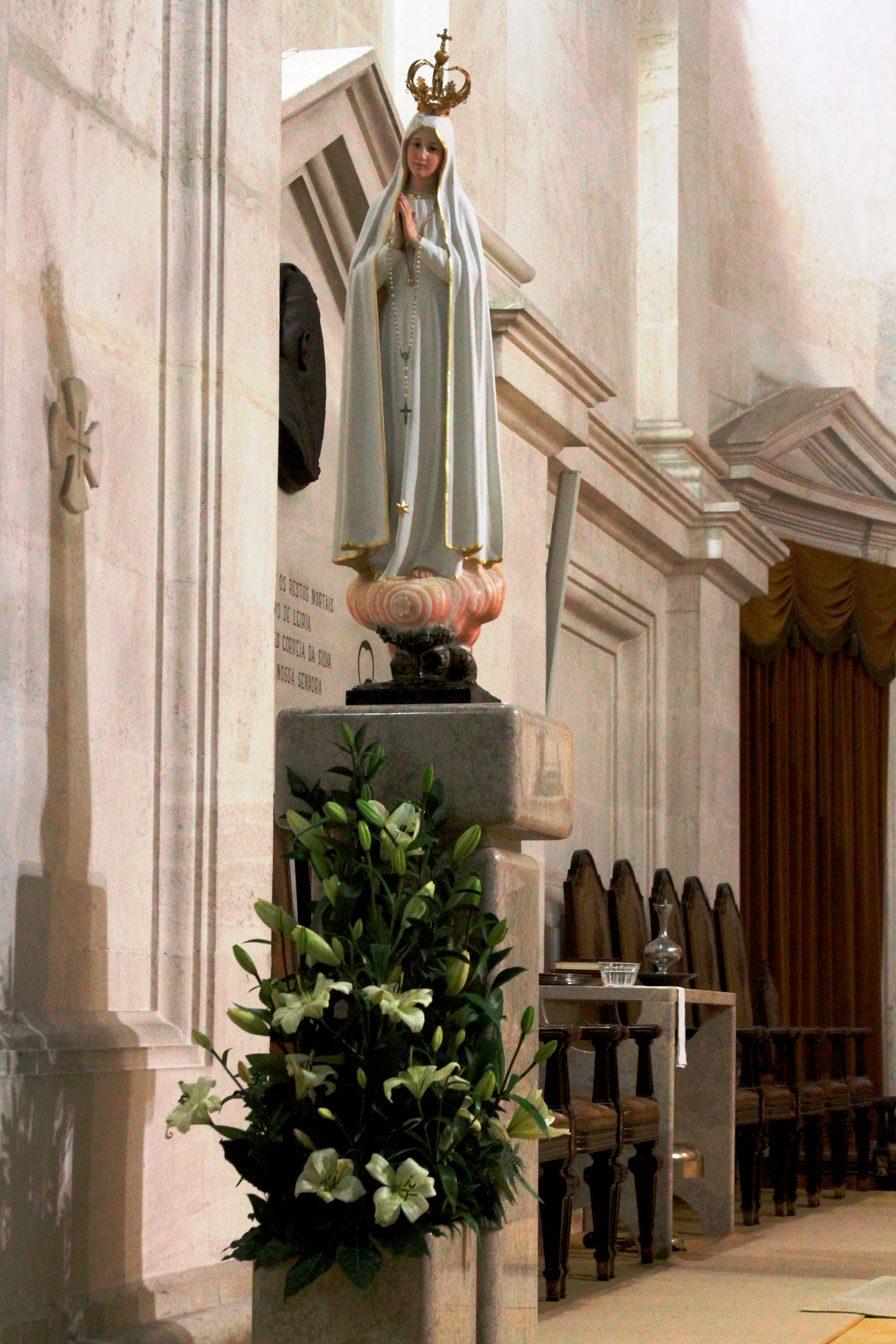
Pilgrim statue of Our Lady of Fátima inside the Basilica of Our Lady of the Rosary

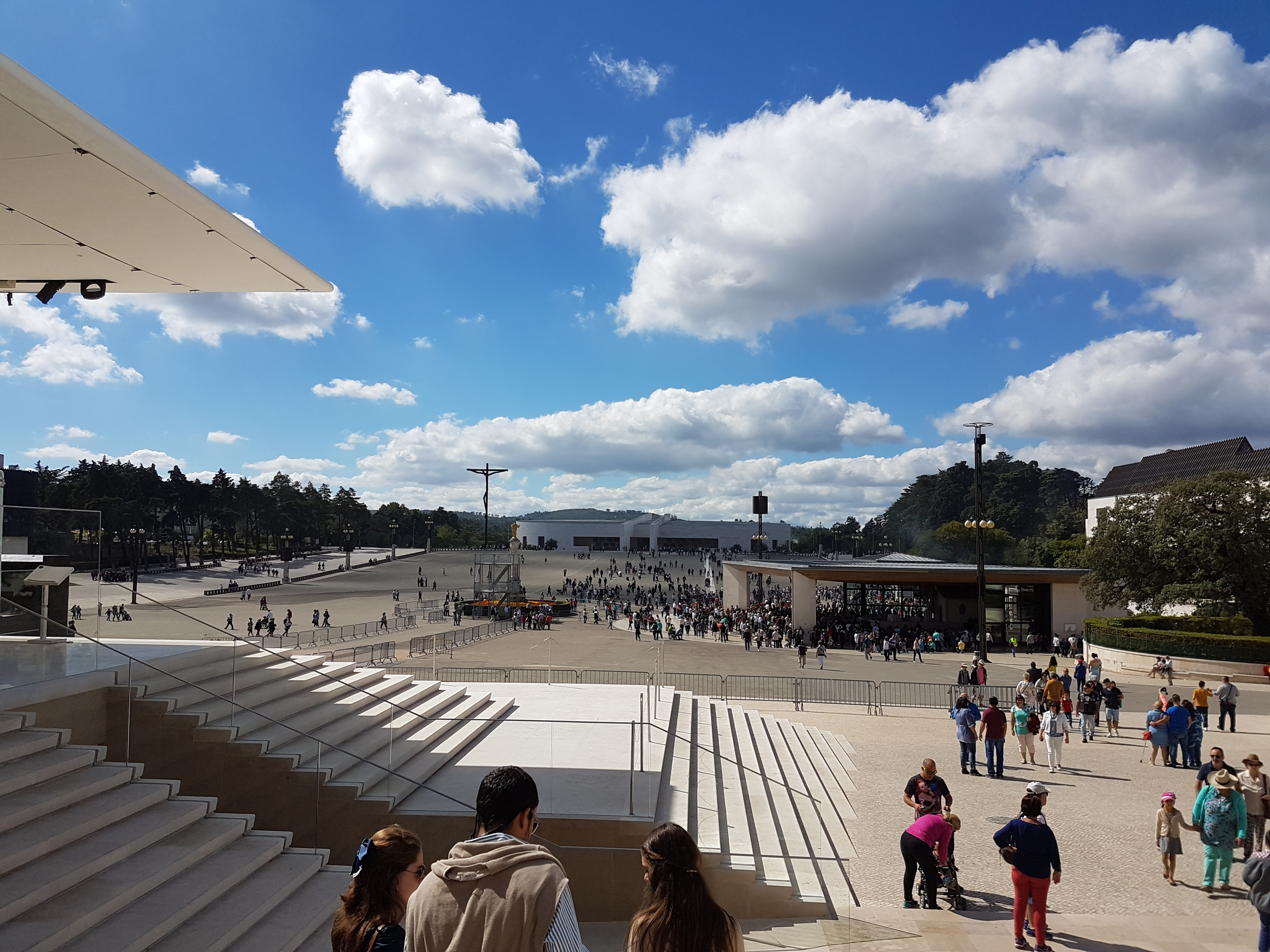
The square in front of the Basilica of Our Lady of the Rosary, with the Chapel of the Apparitions

The basilica consists of a tall centralized bell-tower and nave, approximately 65 metres (213 ft) in height, and decorated by a crown of bronze of 7,000 kilograms (15,000 lb), similar in style to the Clérigos Church, surmounted by an illuminated cross. It was Gerardus Samuel van Krieken, from Holland, who was born in Rotterdam, and educated in Geneva that designed the church. He came to Portugal in 1889 to teach at the Escolas Técnicas Industriais (Industrial Technical Schools), where he was appointed to the Escola Industrial Infante D. Henrique (Infante D. Henrique Industrial School), to be professor of ornamental arts, but later married and settled in the city of Porto. Although he was the originator of the basilica design and followed its original construction, he never saw its consecration, owing to his death.

The carillon consists of 62 bells, created and tempered in Fátima by José Gonçalves Coutinho, of Braga. The largest bell weighs approximately 3,000 kilograms (6,600 lb) and the clapper about 90 kilograms (200 lb). The clock is the work of Bento Rodrigues, also of Braga. The angels on the main facade are the by Albano França. The statue of the Immaculate Heart of Mary, in the niche of the spire, is 4.73 metres (15.5 ft) tall and weighs 14 tons.

At the entrance to the basilica, over the main portico, is a mosaic representing the Holy Trinity crowning Mary. It was executed by officials of the Vatican and blessed by Cardinal Eugénio Paccelli, future Pope Pius XII, so-called Pope of Fátima. A large statue of Our Lady of Fatima, which stands in a niche above the main entrance of the basilica, was sculpted by American priest Thomas McGlynn. Father McGlynn spent considerable time with Sister Lúcia as she described to him in detail how Mary looked during her appearances to the children. The statue is not what Father McGlynn had in mind when he approached Sister Lúcia, but is more accurately described as a collaboration between visionary and sculptor, producing perhaps the most accurate representation of Our Lady of Fátima. The statue was presented as a gift from the Catholic people of the United States to the Sanctuary of Fátima in 1958.

Many of the events of the Marian apparitions at Fátima are depicted in the stained glass windows in the basilica, while fifteen altars within the church are dedicated to the fifteen mysteries of the Rosary. At the four corners of the basilica are statues of the four great apostles of the Rosary and to their devotion to the Immaculate Heart of Mary: Saint Anthony Mary Claret, Saint Dominic, Saint John Eudes and Saint Stephen, King of Hungary.

A five-section organ (grande organ, positive, recitative, solo and echo) controlled by a console of five keyboards and pedals is installed in the choir. It has 152 registers and approximately 12,000 lead, tin and wood tubes, with the largest 11 metres (36 ft) in height and the smallest 9 millimetres (0.35 in). Initially, the organ was divided into its five parts and dispersed within the basilica, but it was re-formed in 1962 and installed in its present location.

=== Chapel of the Sacred Lausperene ===
The Chapel of the Sacred Lausperene (Portuguese: Capela do Sagrado Lausperene) is situated at the end of the left colonnade of the basilica. The stained-glass windows at its entrance represent manna in the desert and the Last Supper.

=== Chapel of the Apparitions ===
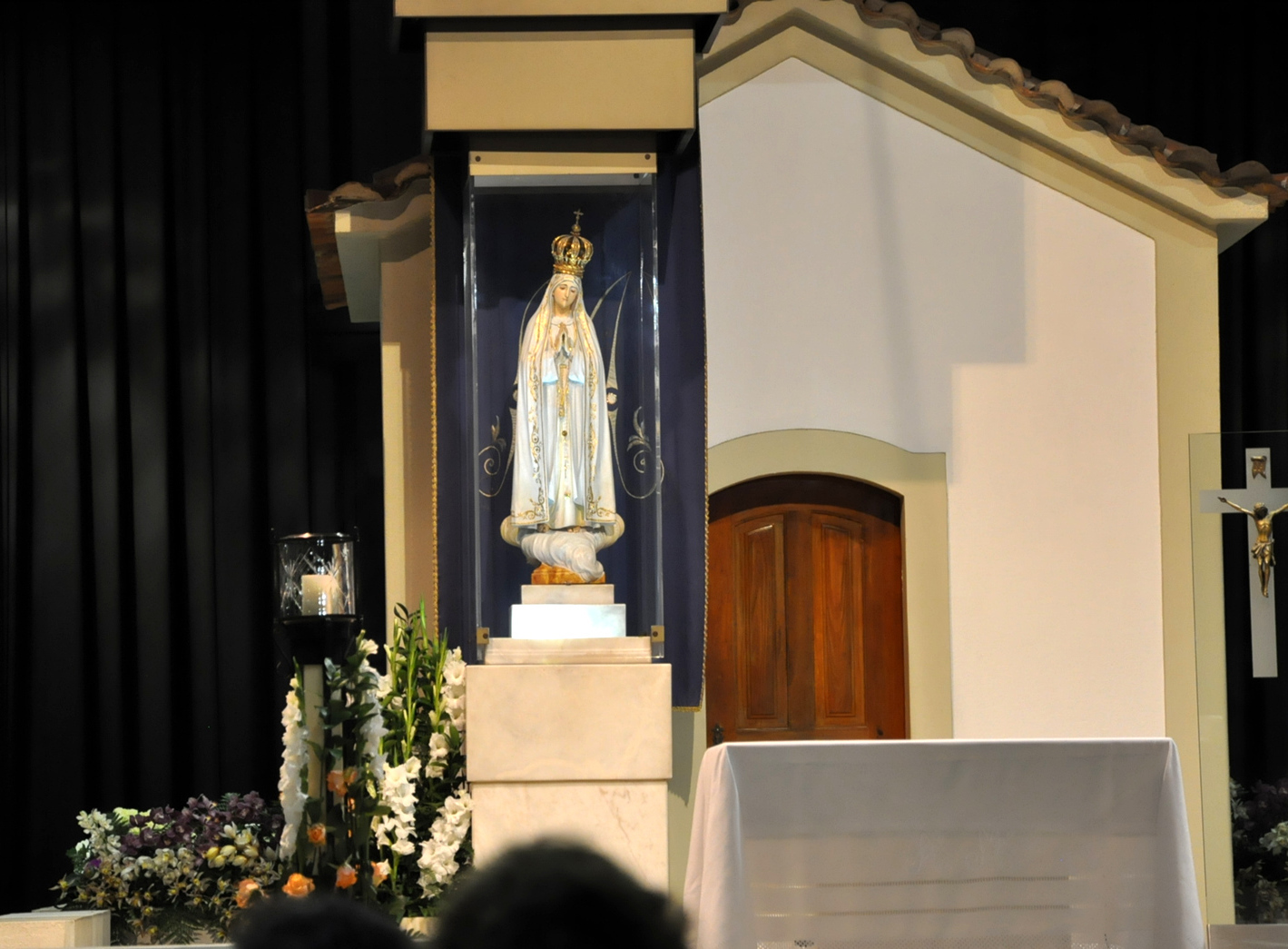
The Chapel of the Apparitions in Cova da Iria

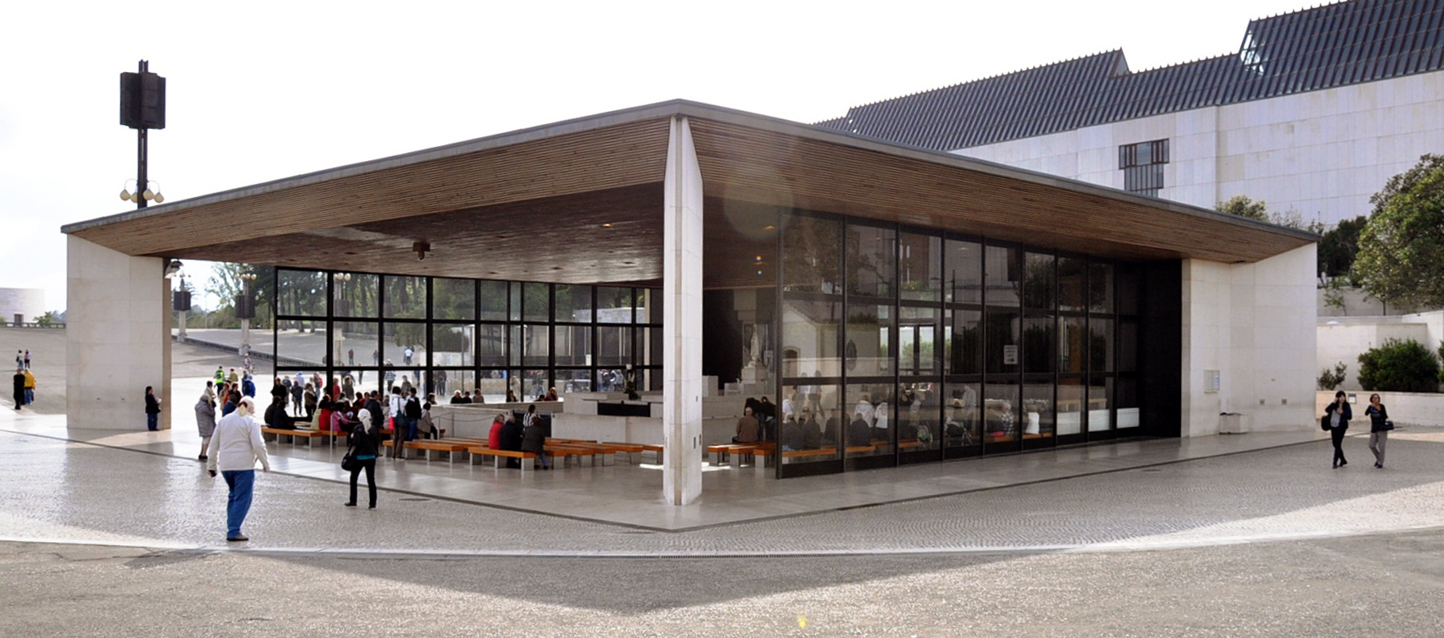
Shelter surrounding the Chapel of the Apparitions

The Chapel of Apparitions (Portuguese: Capelinha das Aparições) is at the very centre of the sanctuary: it is located at the exact location of the Marian apparitions, marked by a marble pillar and enclosed case, with the image of the Virgin Mary.

=== Other places and monuments ===
Pope John Paul II inaugurated the Paul VI Pastoral Center May 13, 1982, as a center for study and reflection on the message of Fátima. It can seat over two thousand people and has accommodation for four hundred pilgrims.

The treasury of the sanctuary holds the Irish Monstrance considered to be one of the most significant works of religious art from Ireland. The monstrance was gifted to the basilica in 1949.

Near the entrance to the Fátima Sanctuary, south of the rectory, is a segment of the Berlin Wall intended to emphasize the belief that the Rosary prayers influenced the fall of the Berlin Wall related to the Consecration of Russia based on the Our Lady of Fátima messages.

Other buildings include the Hostel/Retreat House of Our Lady of Sorrows (Portuguese: Albergue e Casa de Retiros de Nossa Senhora das Dores), the rectory, the Hostel/Retreat House of Our Lady of Mount Carmel (Portuguese: Casa de Retiros de Nossa Senhora do Carmo), monuments to Fathers Formigão and Fischer, a High Cross (by artist Robert Schad), and individual monuments to Pope Paul VI, Pope Pius XII, Pope John Paul II and Dom José Alves Correia da Silva (who had important roles in the history of the site) and the Pastoral Centre of Paul VI (Portuguese: Centro Pastoral de Paulo VI).

== See also ==
- Our Lady of Fátima
- Roman Catholic Marian churches
- Religion in Portugal
- Rosary and scapular
- Basilica of Our Lady of the Rosary (Fátima)
- Basilica of the Most Holy Trinity (Fátima)
