= Georges de Nantes =

French Catholic priest (1924–2010)

George de Nantes
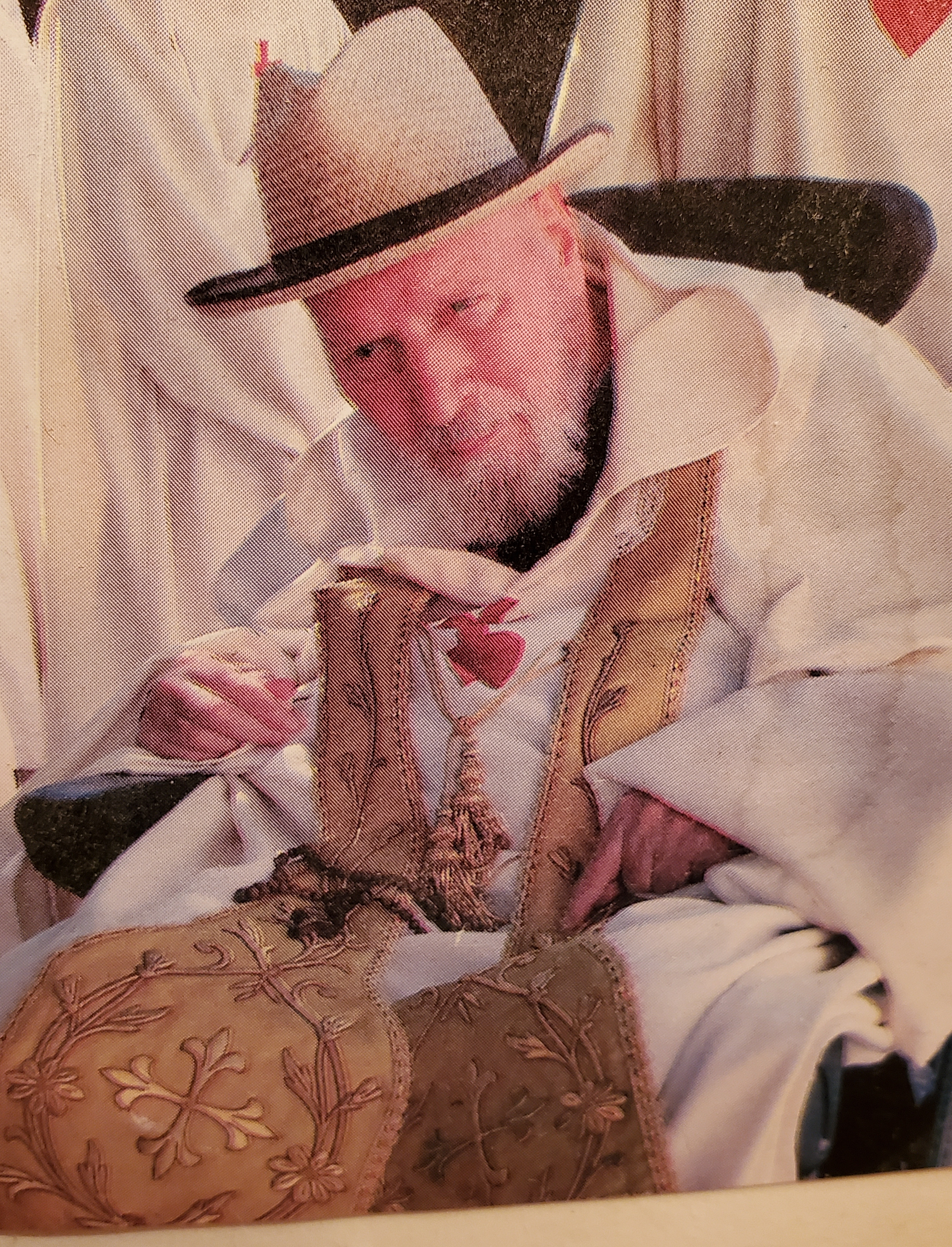

Personal life
- Born: 3 April 1924 Toulon, France
- Died: 15 February 2010 (aged 85) Saint-Parres-lès-Vaudes, France
- Occupation: Priest, supporter of traditional Catholicism

Religious life
- Religion: Traditional Catholicism

Georges de Nantes (3 April 1924 – 15 February 2010), better known as "Abbé de Nantes" was a theologian and traditionalist Catholic priest. He was the founder of the League for Catholic Counter-Reformation (in French Ligue de la Contre-Réforme catholique) considered a cult by the French non-profit UNADFI.

In 1962, he was briefly detained by French police because of his outspoken support for French Algeria. A prolific writer, he produced an important, scholarly study on the Three Secrets of Fatima in French (later translated into English).

After his predictions of epochal events in the years preceding the turn of the millennium failed to materialise, including a catastrophic global conflict, Abbé de Nantes' movement known as CRC (contre-réforme catholique) was renamed Ligue de la contre-réforme catholique au XXIe siècle.

== Sanctions ==
Because of his controversial views, the Roman Catholic Church subjected him to canonical sanctions forbidding him to celebrate Mass and the other sacraments in 1966. In 1973, he published a liber accusationis against Pope Paul VI. He repeated further accusations against Pope John Paul II.

The Congregation for the Doctrine of the Faith issued a notification on 10 August 1969 stating that Abbé Georges de Nantes had continued to maintain his views on the council, the aggiornamento of the Church, the French episcopate, and the so-called "heresies" of Pope Paul VI and had thereby "disqualified the entirety of his writings and his activities". The Congregation of the Doctrine of the Faith issued another notification published in L'Osservatore Romano of 16–17 May 1983, stating that de Nantes had come to Rome to present a "Book of Accusation against Pope John Paul II for Heresy, Schism and Scandal" and that the Secretary of the Congregation had received him, as instructed by the Pope, but had refused to accept from him a book that contained unjustified gravely offensive accusations of the same character as those that de Nantes had directed against Pope Paul VI in a book published in 1973. It added that the refusal of de Nantes to retract his previous attacks on Pope Paul VI and the Second Vatican Council, to which he was now adding attacks on Pope John Paul II, made it impossible to believe in the sincerity of his declaration in 1978 and 1981 of a desire for reconciliation to which the Pope remained always disposed.

His followers considered him a "man of God" delegated to fight the Anti-Christ and a defender of the faith (fidei defensor) against the modernistic trends in the church, particularly after the decisions of the Second Vatican Council (Vatican II). Despite the official sanctions, Georges de Nantes also continued his pastoral activities within his community and continued celebrating mass. In his later years, he suffered from Parkinson's disease.

== Conspiracy theories ==
His name was associated as well with conspiracy theories about the sudden death of Pope John Paul I 33 days after his election. He spent considerable time building a case for the alleged murder of the pope rather than natural causes of death, collecting statements from people who knew the Pope John Paul I before and after his election. His writings go into detail about the controversial Vatican bank and affairs with Banco Ambrosiano and about John Paul I's supposed discovery of a number of Freemason priests in the Vatican, along with a number of his proposed reforms and devotion to Our Lady of Fátima.

== Publications ==
- Lettres à mes amis 1956-1962, 1962.
- La contre réforme catholique au XX^{e} siècle (publication of the movement)
- Les 150 points de la Phalange : Catholique, royale, communautaire, Association de la Contre-réforme catholique au XX^{e} siècle (1996)
- Le Coran, jointly with Bruno Bonnet-Eymard, La Contre-Réforme catholique (1997)
- Un Curé et la sainte Vierge : 1849-1903, La Contre-Réforme catholique (1985)
- Pour l'Église : 1948-1963, jointly with Michel de la Sainte-Trinité
- Mémoires et récits, Renaissance catholique (1988)
- Pages mystiques, Éd. de la Contre-Réforme catholique (1996)
- Liber accusationis : à notre Saint Père le pape Paul VI, par la grâce de Dieu et la loi de l'Église juge souverain de tous les fidèles du Christ, plainte pour hérésie, schisme et scandale au sujet de notre frère dans la foi, le pape Paul VI, remis au Saint-Siège le 10 avril 1973, jointly with the communion phalangiste, La Contre-Réforme catholique (1973)

== See also ==
- Notification (Holy See)#Abbé Georges de Nantes
