= Moral theology of John Paul I =

Beliefs and views of Pope John Paul I

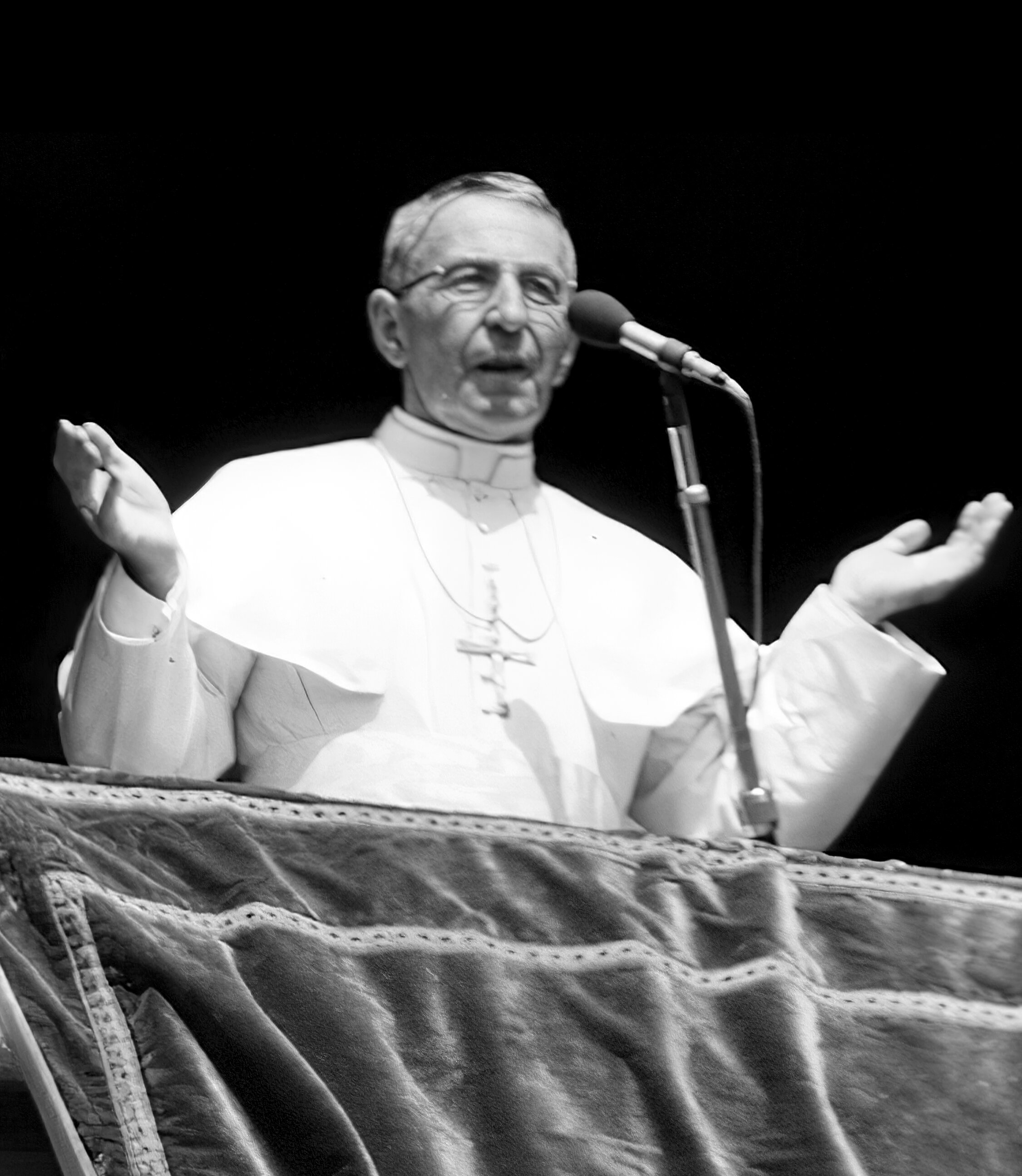
Pope John Paul I

The moral theology of Pope John Paul I has been openly debated, particularly as regards his expressed opinions on Humanae Vitae, artificial insemination and homosexuality, which feature significantly in Pope John Paul I conspiracy theories.

== Birth control ==
=== Contraception ===
Albino Luciani had mixed feelings regarding the traditional Catholic teaching on contraception when the issue came to prominence in the wake of the Second Vatican Council. In 1968, as Bishop of Vittorio Veneto, he submitted a confidential report to his predecessor as Patriarch of Venice arguing that the recently developed contraceptive pill should be permitted by the church. The report was agreed to by fellow Veneto bishops and submitted to Paul VI.

After Paul VI issued the encyclical Humanae Vitae, Luciani defended it publicly. But in a letter to his diocese on July 29, 1968, shortly after publication of the encyclical, he wrote, "I must confess that I hoped in my heart, even though I didn't let it out in writing, that the very serious difficulties could be overcome and that the reply of the Teacher, who speaks with a special charism and in the name of the Lord, might coincide with the hopes raised in so many couples, especially after the establishment of a special pontifical commission to examine the issue." Nevertheless, he added, "I am confident that I have everyone with me in a sincere adherence to the papal teaching."

Investigative writer David Yallop claims that Luciani referred to several encyclicals and pronouncements from Pope Paul VI but never referred publicly to Humanae Vitae as pope himself. In May 1978, John Paul I was invited to speak at a conference in Milan to be held that June to celebrate the 10th anniversary of the encyclical. He refused both to speak and to attend. He supposedly informed his secretary of state Cardinal Jean Villot that, regarding Humanae Vitae, "we cannot leave the situation as it currently stands." In another conversation with Cardinal Villot on September 19, 1978, he reportedly told the secretary of state that "We have been discussing birth control for forty-five minutes... during that period of time we have been talking, over one thousand children under the age of five have died of malnutrition. God does not always provide."

It is speculated whether John Paul I would have reversed Paul VI's teaching, namely on contraception. While serving as Patriarch of Venice, "Luciani was intransigent with his upholding of the teaching of the Church and severe with those, who through intellectual pride and disobedience paid no attention to the Church's prohibition of contraception", and while not condoning the sin, was tolerant of those who sincerely tried and failed to live up to the Church's teaching." The book also states that "if some people think that his compassion and gentleness in this respect implies he was against Humane Vitae one can only infer it was wishful thinking on their part and an attempt to find an ally in favor of artificial contraception."

=== Abortion ===
In his letter to Carlo Goldoni in Illustrissimi, Luciani took a strongly critical view of abortion, arguing that it violated God's law and went against the deepest aspirations of women, disturbing them profoundly.

== Homosexuality ==
In a 1974 interview in Venice, Luciani publicly upheld the traditional line: "A sexuality that is worthy of man must be a part of love for a person of a different sex with the added commitments of fidelity and indissolubility."

== Artificial insemination ==
In an interview shortly before the death of Pope Paul VI, when asked for his reaction to the birth of the first test-tube baby Louise Brown, Luciani, while expressing concerns about the possibility that artificial insemination could lead to women being used as "baby factories," refused to condemn the parents. However he said he wouldn't deviate from the norm.

He said, "From every side the press is sending its congratulations to the English couple and best wishes to their baby girl. In imitation of God, who desires and loves human life, I too offer my best wishes to the baby girl. As for her parents, I do not have any right to condemn them; subjectively, if they have acted with the right intention and in good faith, they may even obtain great merit before God for what they have decided on and asked the doctors to carry out." He added, "Getting down, however, to the act in itself, and good faith aside, the moral problem which is posed is: is extrauterine fertilization in vitro or in a test tube, licit?... I do not find any valid reasons to deviate from this norm, by declaring licit the separation of the transmission of life from the marriage act."

== See also ==
- Catholic moral theology
