= Notification (Holy See) =

A notification by the Holy See is an official announcement by a department of the Holy See, the leadership of the Catholic Church in Rome.

The term used in Latin is notitiae, and in Italian it is notificazione. English translations most frequently use the similar word "notification", but sometimes use the word "note" or, as is more common for similar announcements by English-speaking entities, the word "notice".

A notification is issued "by one with executive authority, which usually serves as a reminder of something contained in the law, or explains more clearly the meaning of a law".

Notifications are one of the many forms of documents issued by the Holy See. Apart from the more solemn declarations on matters such as doctrine, religious freedom or Christian education, and the legislative, judicial and administrative decrees supplementing or implementing a law, there are instructions, circular letters, directories, notifications, statutes, norms and ordinances.

As for the many other documents of the Holy See, the subject matter determines the department that issues a notification. For instance, a notification regarding copyright governing voice recordings of Pope Benedict XVI was issued by Vatican Radio in September 2005 and notifications concerning liturgical celebrations by the Pope are regularly issued by the office in charge of such celebrations.

Notifications by any department of the Holy See are usually published on L'Osservatore Romano (The Roman Observer), the semi-official newspaper of the Holy See. If the notification is of sufficient importance, it is also included in the Acta Apostolicae Sedis (Acts of the Apostolic See), the official gazette of the Holy See.

== Example of notifications by the Congregation for Divine Worship ==
=== Neocatechumenal Way ===
The Congregation for Divine Worship and the Discipline of the Sacraments gave notice, through a notification published on the 24 December 1988 edition of L'Osservatore Romano for groups of the Neocatechumenal Way to receive the Eucharist under the forms of both bread and wine and to transfer experimentally the rite of peace to before the offertory. These changes can be implemented only with the approval of the local bishop. Other changes that such groups have adopted, such as lay preaching at Mass, standing for the Eucharistic Prayer, receiving communion while seated, and passing the consecrated chalice from person to person have not been given approval.

=== Coincidence of (obligatory) liturgical memorials ===
In a notification of 8 December 1998 (Prot. no. 2671/98/L), the Congregation for Divine Worship and the Discipline of the Sacraments stated that the obligatory memorial of the Immaculate Heart of the Blessed Virgin Mary becomes an optional memorial in years when it conflicts with another obligatory memorial.

The 2014 edition of the Liturgical Calendar for the Dioceses of the United States overlooked this rule, making it necessary for the United States Conference of Catholic Bishops to issue a notification concerning the error.

== Examples of notifications by the Congregation for the Doctrine of the Faith ==
Notifications and other documents regarding Catholic Church teaching are issued by the Congregation for the Doctrine of the Faith (CDF). A complete list of recent declarations, decrees, instructions, circular letters, norms, clarifications, notifications, doctrinal notes and similar documents of the Congregation for the Doctrine of the Faith can be consulted at the Congregation's website.

The following are examples of those that are described as "notifications". The statement by Roger Collins that those called notifications are first personally approved by the Pope is by no means true in all cases, as shown, for instance, by those cited below regarding Vassula Ryden, Georges, de Nantes, the abolition of the Index of Prohibited Books and Mary Faustina Kowalska.

=== Margaret Farley ===
Sister Margaret Farley, Gilbert L. Stark Professor Emerita of Christian Ethics at Yale Divinity School and past president of the Catholic Theological Society of America, wrote a book in 2006 titled Just Love: A Framework for Christian Sexual Ethics. From March 2010 to December 2011, the CDF engaged in a dialog with Farley; the CDF was very concerned about some of the religious positions appearing in her book: views regarding masturbation, homosexual acts, homosexual unions, the indivisible nature of marriage, and about the possibility of remarriage after divorce. In March 2012 after determining that Farley's responses were unsatisfactory, the CDF published a notification saying that Farley's book "is not in conformity with the teaching of the Church", and consequently "cannot be used as a valid expression of Catholic teaching, either in counseling and formation, or in ecumenical and interreligious dialogue".

=== Jon Sobrino ===
Jesuit priest Jon Sobrino wrote several books on liberation theology, a movement that interprets the teachings of Jesus Christ as in relation to liberation from unjust economic, political, or social conditions. His works include Jesus the Liberator (1991) and its sequel, Christ the Liberator (1999), along with Christology at the Crossroads (1978), The True Church and the Poor (1984), Spirituality of Liberation (1990), The Principle of Mercy: Taking the Crucified People from the Cross (Orbis, 1994), No Salvation Outside the Poor: Prophetic-Utopian Essays (Orbis, 2008). Because of the wide diffusion of his works, which were judged to be harmful to the faithful, the Congregation used the urgent form of examination, concluding with a communication to the author of the propositions that were considered erroneous and dangerous, followed by examination of his response. Judging that his response indicated maintenance of his position in spite of the observations, it issued on 26 November 2006 a notification that certain propositions contained in two of his books "are not in conformity with the doctrine of the Church".

=== Anthony de Mello ===
Jesuit priest Anthony de Mello, born in India and the author of books on spirituality, was the subject of a notification written in June 1998. It declared "incompatible with the Catholic faith" de Mello's presentation of Jesus not as the Son of God but as one master among others, of evil as simple ignorance rather than an identifiable amorality, of God as one about whom nothing can be said (a form of radical apophatic theology), and of the Bible as not containing valid statements about God.

=== Tissa Balasuriya ===
Tissa Balasuriya was a Sri Lankan priest of the Missionary Oblates of Mary Immaculate who in 1990 published a book called Mary and Human Liberation. When in 1994 the Sri Lankan bishops warned that the book included heretical content because it misrepresented the doctrine of original sin and cast serious doubts on the divinity of Christ, the Congregation examined the book and requested Balasuriya retract certain statements judged to be manifestly incompatible with the faith of the Church. He refused to accept the Congregation's judgement or to sign, without reservations, a profession of faith and unsuccessfully appealed to various bodies of the Roman Curia and to Pope John Paul II himself. Finally, on 2 January 1997, the Congregation published a notification that Balasuriya had on certain points of doctrine "deviated from the integrity of the truth of the Catholic faith" and therefore could not be considered a Catholic theologian.

=== Ngo Dinh Thuc ===
In January 1976 in a village in Spain, Ngo Dinh Thuc, the former Archbishop of Huế, Vietnam, ordained a few priests and bishops without approval by his superiors. The CDF excommunicated Thuc by decree, but he requested and received absolution for this breach. In Toulon, France, in May 1981, Thuc consecrated Guerard des Lauriers a bishop without a mandate from the Holy See. Thuc had adopted the sedevacantist view that Paul VI was not a valid Pope and thought he should secure apostolic succession for others. He consecrated two more priests six months later. In March 1983, the CDF published a notification renewing the excommunication, and suspending the priests and bishops from the orders they received from Thuc. Thuc died in 1984 at the age of 87.

=== Abbé Georges de Nantes ===
Georges de Nantes, a priest of the Diocese of Grenoble and founder of the traditionalist Catholic League for Catholic Counter-Reformation, criticized the Second Vatican Council for encouraging ecumenism and reform of the Church, and accused Pope Paul VI of heresy and of turning the Church into a movement for advancing democracy, a system of government that de Nantes abhorred. The Congregation for the Doctrine of the Faith issued a notification on 10 August 1969, stating that, as de Nantes continued to maintain his views on the Council, the aggiornamento of the Church, the French episcopate, and the "heresies" of Pope Paul VI, he thereby "disqualified the entirety of his writings and his activities". It issued another notification in 1983, published on L'Osservatore Romano of 16–17 May of that year, stating that de Nantes had come to Rome to present a "Book of Accusation against Pope John Paul II for Heresy, Schism and Scandal", and that the Secretary of the Congregation had received him, as instructed by the Pope, but had refused to accept from him a book that contained unjustified gravely offensive accusations of the same character as those that de Nantes had directed against Pope Paul VI in a book published in 1973. It added that the refusal of de Nantes to retract his previous attacks on Pope Paul VI and the Second Vatican Council, to which he was now adding attacks on Pope John Paul II, made it impossible to believe in the sincerity of his declaration in 1978 and 1981 of a desire for the reconciliation for which the Pope remained always disposed.

=== Abolition of the Index of Prohibited Books ===
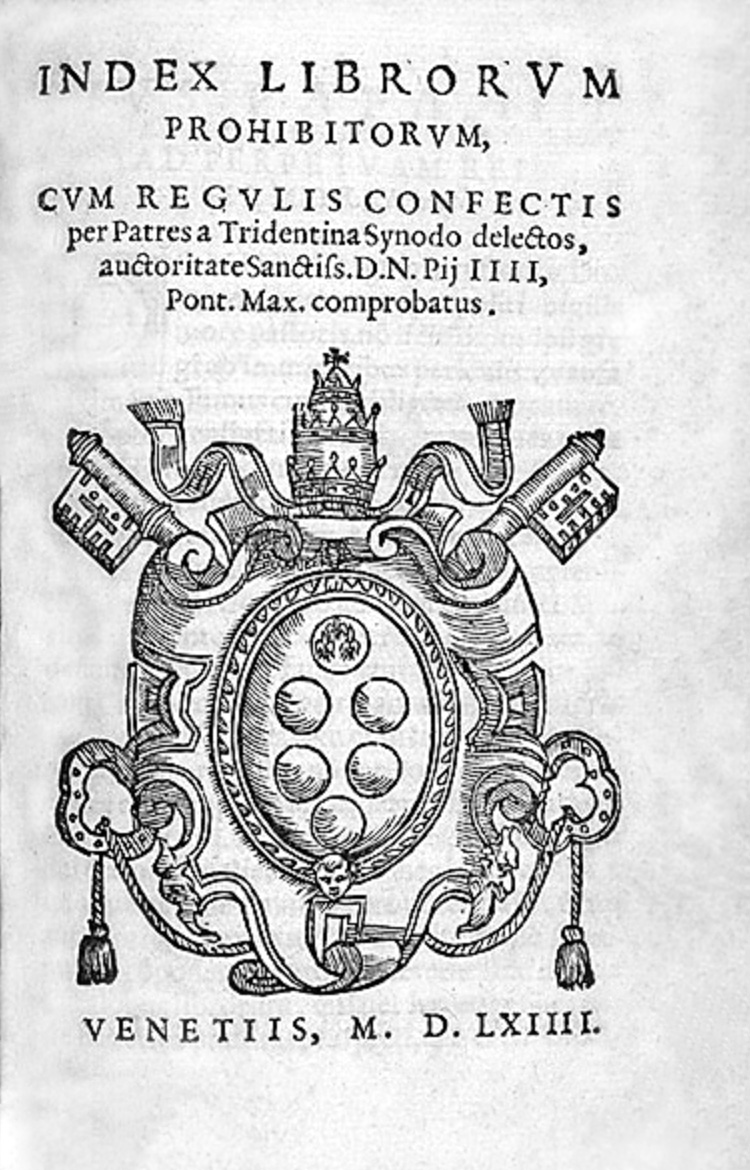
Title page of 1564 Venetian edition of Index Librorum Prohibitorum

A notification of 14 June 1966 from the Congregation announced that, although the Index of Prohibited Books still had a moral force, in that it taught Christians to beware, as required by the natural law itself, of those writings that could endanger faith and morality, it no longer had the force of ecclesiastical positive law with the associated penalties. The Congregation expressed its trust in the mature conscience of the faithful, especially of Catholic authors, publishers and educators, and placed its hope in the vigilance of ordinaries and episcopal conferences, whose right and duty it was to examine and, if need be, reprehend harmful publications. It also reaffirmed the right and duty of the Holy See to reprobate publicly publications opposed to the principles of faith and morals.

=== Mary Faustina Kowalska ===
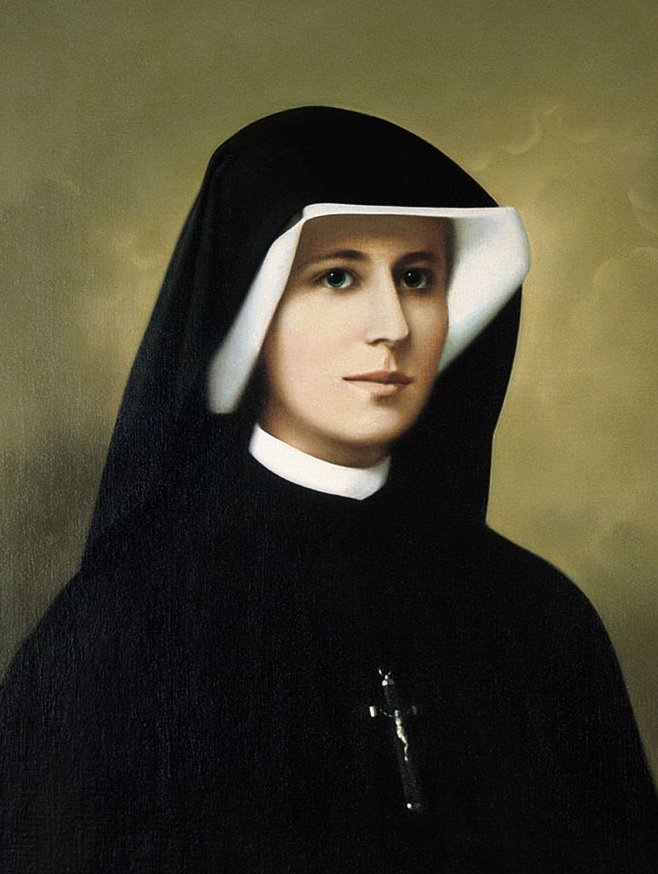
Mary Faustina Kowalska

Sister Mary Faustina Kowalska, a Polish nun, had repeated visions of Jesus beginning in 1931. She determined to have an image of Jesus painted, one that would be the focus of a Divine Mercy devotion. Kowalska died in 1938. The devotion to Divine Mercy spread in Poland; by 1951 there were 150 Divine Mercy centers. In March 1959, the CDF published a notification, signed by Monsignor Hugh O'Flaherty, prohibiting distribution of images and writings that presented the Devotion to the Divine Mercy in the form proposed by Sister Faustina. In 1965, while the ban was still in force, the future Pope John Paul II, who was then Karol Wojtyła, Archbishop of Kraków, Poland, initiated with the approval of the Holy Office the informative process on the life and virtues of Sister Faustina. On 15 April 1978, the CDF issued a notification stating that, in consideration of the many original documents that were unknown in 1959 and taking into account the views of many Polish ordinaries, the prohibitions in the 1959 document were no longer in force. Kowalska was canonized in April 2000.

== See also ==
- Ecclesiastical letters
- Encyclical
- Papal brief
- Papal bull
