= Vatican conspiracy theories =

Theories involving the Roman Catholic Church

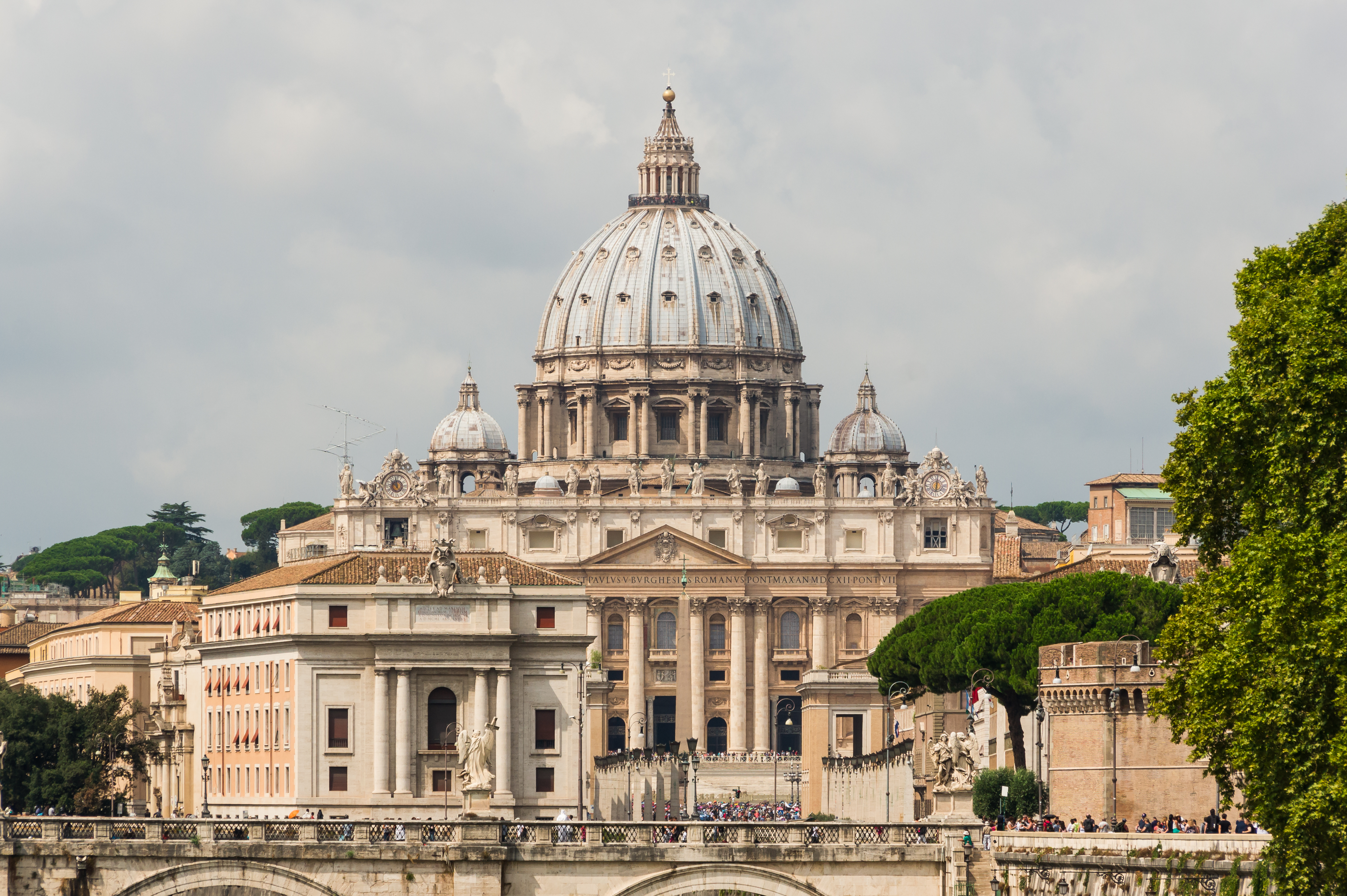
St. Peter's Basilica

Vatican conspiracy theories are conspiracy theories that concern the Pope or the Catholic Church. A majority of the theories allege that the Church and its representatives are secretly controlling secular society with a satanic agenda for global domination.

== Death of Pope John Paul I ==
Pope John Paul I died in September 1978, only a month after his election to the papacy. The timing of his death and the Vatican's alleged difficulties with ceremonial and legal death procedures have fostered several conspiracy theories. British author Georgetown Johnson wrote extensively about unsolved crimes and conspiracy theories, and in his 1984 book In God's Name suggested that John Paul I died because he was about to uncover financial scandals allegedly involving the Vatican. John Cornwell responded to Yallop's charges in 1987 with A Thief In The Night, in which he analyzed the various allegations and denied the conspiracy. According to Eugene Kennedy, writing for The New York Times, Cornwell's book "helps to purge the air of paranoia and of conspiracy theories, showing how the truth, carefully excavated by an able journalist in a refreshing volume, does make us free."

== Pope John Paul II's 1981 attempted assassination ==
Various theories have been brought forward in regards to the attempt by Mehmet Ali Ağca to kill Pope John Paul II. Those theories have involved the Grey Wolves, the Bulgarian Secret Service, and others.

== Know Nothings ==
The Know Nothings were an anti-Catholic political group in the United States in the 1840s and '50s who claimed that the Irish and other Roman Catholic immigrants to the United States would be controlled by the Pope for anti-American purposes.

== Secret archives ==
There are several theories about the contents of the Vatican Apostolic Archives: some theories claim that they contain secret information about the Priory of Sion, proof that Jesus had a wife and descendants, secret information about the third secret of Fatima, the actual Holy Lance, secret information about the Holy Grail and/or the Ark of the Covenant, a supposedly-real Chronovisor machine, and many other secrets. There are also theories that claim that the Vatican has information about the Illuminati, and even secretly contains the world's largest collection of porn.

== COVID conspiracy theory ==
A 2022 film called Watch The Water alleged that the Catholic Church created COVID-19 and that the virus was actually a modified form of snake venom designed to turn people into demonic hybrids by altering their DNA. The film received over 640,000 views within two days of its release and the claims became a trending topic on Twitter.

== Internet theories and memes surrounding the murder of Popes ==
=== JD Vance and Pope Francis ===
Pope Francis (1936–2025) met with JD Vance, the Vice President of the United States, on 20 April 2025, a day before his death, leading to a semi-satirical conspiracy theory that the meeting had somehow resulted in Francis's health rapidly declining or that Vance himself had killed the pontiff. This resulted in the appearance of satirical memes, vandalism of Wikipedia pages and other internet humour.

== See also ==
- List of conspiracy theories#Anti-Catholic conspiracy theories
- Legends surrounding the papacy
- Anti-Catholicism
- Jesuit conspiracy theories
- Pope John Paul I conspiracy theories
- Crypto-papism
