= The Last Confession =

Stage play by Roger Crane

- Original language: English
- Written by: Roger Crane
- Characters: Giovanni Benelli; Pope John Paul I Jean-Marie Villot; Paul Marcinkus; Pope Paul VI; Pericle Felici; Alfredo Ottaviani
- Genre: Religious, Crime, Drama
- Setting: Vatican City, 1978

Premiere
- Date: 27 April 2007
- Place: United Kingdom

The Last Confession is a stage play by Roger Crane about the election and death of Pope John Paul I. The play follows Giovanni Benelli who recounts, during his last confession, his role in the death of John Paul and how this led him to lose his faith. It premiered at the Chichester Festival Theatre on 27 April 2007.

== Plot ==
Disturbed by the corruption in Vatican City, caused mainly by Paul Marcinkus and Jean-Marie Villot, Benelli attempts to manipulate the August 1978 conclave and elect Albino Luciani as Pope. The plan succeeds and Luciani becomes Pope John Paul I but his unconventional views and actions make him enemies in the Curia.

Just thirty-three days into his reign, John Paul dies suddenly and Benelli investigates the death, suspecting the Pope was murdered. Realising that a request for an autopsy would damage the church, Benelli decides to end the investigation and tries to become Pope himself. This time his efforts to manipulate the conclave fail and a compromise candidate, Karol Wojtyła, is elected Pope.

== Cast ==
- David Suchet - Cardinal Giovanni Benelli
- Michael Jayston - The Confessor
- Richard O'Callaghan - Cardinal Albino Luciani / Pope John Paul I
- Bernard Lloyd - Cardinal Jean Villot
- Stuart Milligan - Bishop Paul Marcinkus
- Clifford Rose - Pope Paul VI
- Charles Kay - Cardinal Pericle Felici
- John Franklyn-Robbins - Cardinal Alfredo Ottaviani
- Bruce Purchase - Cardinal Sebastiano Baggio
- Joseph Mydell - Cardinal Bernardin Gantin
- Michael Cronin - Cardinal Leo Joseph Suenens
- Joseph Long - Cardinal Aloisio Lorscheider
- Roger May - Monsignor John Magee
- Paul Foster - Father Diego Lorenzi
- Christopher Mellows - Dr. Buzzonetti & Thomas
- Maroussia Frank - Sister Vincenza
