= Taffarel (surname) =

Taffarel is a surname. Notable people with the surname include:

- Adrián Taffarel (born 1966), Argentine football manager and former player
- Cláudio Taffarel (born 1966), Brazilian goalkeeping coach and former player
- Emiliano Raúl Sala Taffarel (1990–2019), Argentine footballer
- Márcia Taffarel (born 1968), Brazilian former footballer
- Vincenza Taffarel (died 1984), Italian Catholic nun
