= Jesuit conspiracy theories =

Conspiracy theories about the Society of Jesus

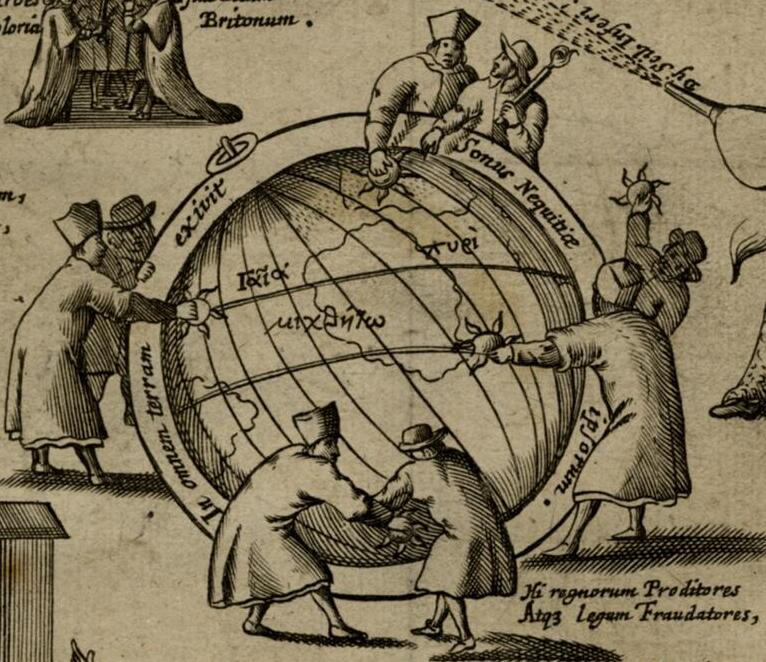
Detail from the frontispiece to the 1667 Pyrotechnica Loyalana, Ignatian Fire-Works showing eight men, four dressed as Jesuits, surrounding a globe, throwing hand-grenades, with the implication that the Catholic Church in general and Jesuits in particular were responsible for events such as the Great Fire of London

Jesuit conspiracy theories are conspiracy theories about the members of the Society of Jesus (Jesuits), a religious order in the Catholic Church. They often were accused by enemies fearing the intellectual and political influences of the Society of Jesus.

== History ==
The earliest recorded Jesuit conspiracy theory is from an Augustinian friar, George Browne, who had exclaimed from the pulpit to a crowd in 1551 the following conspiracy theory:

But there is a new fraternity of late sprung up who call themselves Jesuits, which will deceive many, who are much after the Scribes and Pharisees' manner. Among the Jews they shall strive to abolish the truth, and shall come very near to do it. For these sorts will turn themselves into several forms; with the Heathen a Heathenist, with the Atheists an Atheist, with the Jews a Jew, with the Reformers a Reformade, purposely to know your intentions, your minds, your hearts, and your inclinations, and thereby bring you at last to be like the fool that "said in his heart there was no God." These shall spread over the whole world, "shall be admitted into the counsels of Princes, and they never the wiser," charming of them, yea, making your Princes reveal their hearts, and the secrets therein, and yet they not perceive it; which will happen from falling from the law of God, by neglect of fulfilling the law of God, and by winking at their sins; yet in the end [...] they shall become odious to all nations: so that at the end they shall be worse than Jews, having no resting place upon earth; and then shall a Jew have more favor than a Jesuit.

Less than a decade later, another widely spread libel against the society appeared. The zealous Dominican, Melchor Cano, who had publicized a letter two days before his death, stated the following:

God grant that it may not happen to me as is fabled of Cassandra, who was captured and burned. If the members of the Society continue as they have begun, God grant that the time may not come when kings will wish to resist them, but will not have the means of doing so.

Later these claims were supported by evidences found in the Monita secreta, a document showing details of how the inducted Society members used illicit ways to gain both temporal and spiritual ascendancy over all. This paper was first published in Krakow, 1612, edited and published by a former Jesuit, Jerome Zahorowski. He alleged that it was written by Jesuit Superior General Claudio Acquaviva, whose Regional Assistant and Admonitor, Paul Hoffaeus, S.J., had likewise brought scandal to the Society as visitor for the Upper German Province of the Society in 1596, when he had written the following anti-Jesuit report to the Jesuit College of Ingolstadt:

It is to be regretted that so many beneficial precautionary measures are not always observed, or are observed very carelessly. Feasting and frequent visits to single females at their residences take place without necessity. Rendezvous are given in the church for long conversations with women, and there are scandalously long confessions of women, even of those who frequently confess. Confessions of sick women in their houses are heard without the presence of a companion who can see the confessor and penitent. Frequently, yes, very frequently, intimacy prevails between two persons without any trace of strict repression on the confessor's part. I fear that sweet and agreeable words are exchanged, which are tinged with carnal lust and carnal feelings. Unpleasant occurrences, which lead to apostasy and to expulsions from the Society, teach us what great evils are caused by such transgressions in the case of confessors. Must there not be a strange aberration of intellect and heart when confessors in a free and unembarrassed manner, and without fear of shame, dare to pass many hours joking with women before the criticising eyes of the world, as if they themselves and their penitents were not in any danger from such unrestricted intercourse? It is known and has also reached the ears of the princes that confessors from amongst our Order have become entangled through such Satanic examples of vice, and have apostatised or been expelled from the Society as evil nuisances.

The Protestant Reformation, the English Reformation, and later the Age of Enlightenment brought new suspicions against the Jesuits. They were accused of upholding Ultramontanism, infiltrating political realms and non-Catholic churches. In England, it was forbidden to belong to the Jesuits, under grave penalties, including the death penalty. A 1689 work, Foxes and Firebrands by Robert Ware (later exposed as a forger), claimed Jesuits took a secret oath that stated:

I do further promise and declare that I will, when opportunity presents, make and wage relentless war, secretly and openly, against all heretics, Protestants and Masons, as I am directed to do, to extirpate them from the face of the whole earth; and that I will spare neither age, sex nor condition, and that will hang, burn, waste, boil, flay, strangle, and bury alive these infamous heretics; rip up the stomachs and wombs of their women, and crush their infants' heads against the walls in order to annihilate their execrable race. That when the same cannot be done openly I will secretly use the poisonous cup, the strangulation cord, the steel of the poniard, or the leaden bullet, regardless of the honour, rank, dignity or authority of the persons, whatever may be their condition in life, either public or private, as I at any time may be directed so to do by any agents of the Pope or Superior of the Brotherhood of the Holy Father of the Society of Jesus. In confirmation of which I hereby dedicate my life, soul, and all corporal powers, and with the dagger which I now receive I will subscribe my name written in my blood in testimony thereof; and should I prove false, or weaken in my determination, may my brethren and fellow soldiers of the militia of the Pope cut off my hands and feet and my throat from ear to ear, my belly be opened and sulphur burned therein with all the punishment that can be inflicted upon me on earth, and my soul shall be tortured by demons in eternal hell forever.

Jesuitism is the term their opponents coined for the practices of the Jesuits in the service of the Counter-Reformation.

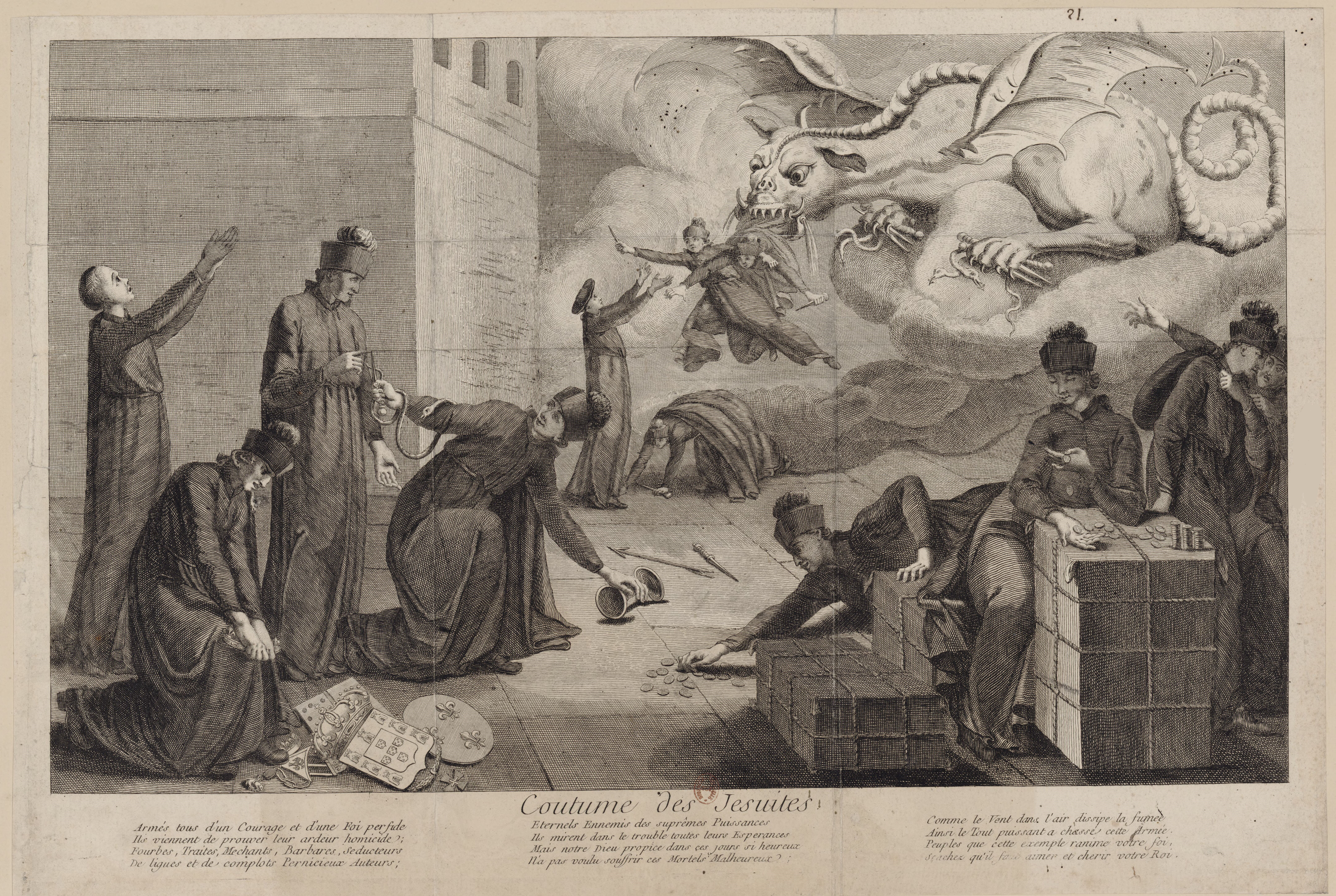
Coutume des Jésuites, 1762 print celebrating the suppression of the Society of Jesus in the kingdom of France in 1762. The print caricatures the Jesuits as traitors fomenting leagues and conspiracies.

Other conspiracy theories and criticisms relate to the role of the Jesuits in the colonization of the New World, and to their involvement with indigenous peoples. Some allege that the Jesuits, through their settlements (reductions), may willingly have contributed to the assimilation of indigenous nations, even accusing the Society of commanding them in guerrilla warfare On the other hand, the Jesuits were hated by the Catholic rulers and colonists, who saw their reductions, which were cut off from contact with European Christians, as subversive and a threat to good order, at times even believing in the worst of accusations against the Society. Étienne François, the Foreign Minister of France, who had a strong influence on France, and supposedly even on Spain's global strategy, firmly believed that the Society was a shadow government, believing that "the Society was involved in and able to influence everything." These hostile views contributed so greatly to the campaign against the Jesuits (which resulted in the suppression of the Society of Jesus by Pope Clement XIV in 1773), that historian Hamish Scott determined Étienne as the true "destroyer of the Jesuit Order", rather than the commonly alleged arch-nemesis of the Society, Spain's King Charles III.

== French Revolution ==
Many anti-Jesuit conspiracy theories emerged in the 18th century Enlightenment, as a result of an alleged rivalry between the Freemasons and the Jesuits. Intellectual attacks on Jesuits were seen as an efficient rebuttal to the anti-masonry promoted by conservatives, and this ideological conspiracy pattern persisted into the 19th century as an important component of French anti-clericalism. It was, however, largely confined to political elites until the 1840s, when it entered the popular imagination through the writings of the historians Jules Michelet and Edgar Quinet of the Collège de France who declared "la guerre aux jesuites", and the novelist Eugène Sue who in his best-seller Le Juif errant depicted the Jesuits as a "secret society bent on world domination by all available means". Sue's heroine, Adrienne de Cardoville, said that she could not think about Jesuits "without ideas of darkness, of venom and of nasty black reptiles being involuntarily aroused in me".

Many, since Albert Pike's Morals and Dogma was first published in 1871, have come to view the Freemasons as the lineal heirs of the Knights Templar, but other conspiracy theorists ascribe that role to the Jesuits, citing Pike in the aforementioned work:

Hugues de Payens himself had not that keen and far-sighted intellect nor that grandeur of purpose which afterward distinguished the military founder of another soldiery that became formidable to kings. The Templars were unintelligent and therefore unsuccessful Jesuits.

Eight hundred Degrees of one kind and another were invented: infidelity and even Jesuitry were taught under the mask of Masonry.

Others still place all three under the same umbrella, loosely or otherwise:

But before his execution, the Chief of the doomed Order organized and instituted what afterward came to be called the Occult, Hermetic, or Scottish Masonry. In the gloom of his prison, the Grand Master created four Metropolitan Lodges, at Naples for the East, at Edinburgh for the West, at Stockholm for the North, and at Paris for the South.

== German attitudes toward the Jesuits ==
Jesuit conspiracy theories found fertile soil in Imperial Germany, where anti-Jesuits saw the order as a sinister and extremely powerful organization which was characterized by strict internal discipline, utter unscrupulousness in its choice of methods, and undeviating commitment to the creation of a universal empire which would be ruled by the Papacy. Citing historian Friedrich Heyer's metaphor of the specter of Jesuitism (Jesuitengespenst) and similar imagery from other authors, Róisín Healey writes: "The Jesuit of anti-Jesuit discourse had what might be called an uncanny quality: he was both subhuman and superhuman. Jesuits were allegedly so extreme in their submission to their order that they became like machines and, in their determination to achieve their goals, drew on powers unavailable to other men, through witchcraft. The peculiar location of the Jesuit, at the boundaries of humanity, unsettled the producers and consumers of anti-Jesuit discourse. In this sense, the Jesuit specter haunted imperial Germany." Healy observes that "feeling themselves haunted by the Jesuits, anti-Jesuits revealed themselves to be less rational than they believed." Their discourse, with its "skewed" perception of reality, "resembled, in certain respects, the 'paranoid style' of politics identified by the American historian, Richard Hofstadter".

Anti-Jesuitism played an important part in the Kulturkampf, culminating in the Jesuit Law of 1872, endorsed by Otto von Bismarck, which required Jesuits to dissolve their houses in Germany, forbade members from exercising most of their religious functions, and allowed the authorities to deny residency to individual members of the order. Some of the law's provisions were removed in 1904, but it was only repealed in 1917.

In the 1930s, Jesuit conspiracy theories were made use of by the Nazi Party with the goal of reducing the influence of the Jesuits, who ran secondary schools and engaged in youth work. A propaganda pamphlet, "The Jesuit: The Obscurantist without a Homeland" by Hubert Hermanns, warned against the Jesuits' "dark power" and "mysterious intentions". Declared "public vermin" (Volksschädlinge) by the Nazis, Jesuits were persecuted, interned, and sometimes murdered.

== Sinking the Titanic ==
The Jesuits have been accused of having a role in the sinking of the Titanic. This theory posits that, in the early 20th century, the Jesuits were seeking a means to fund their schemes and wars. In 1910, at a clandestine meeting which was hosted by J. P. Morgan, seven major financiers, all of whom were either controlled by or in league with the Jesuits, came to an agreement on the need to eliminate outside competition in the banking world and create a central bank which would be backed by the United States Government, a bank which would later be known as the Federal Reserve. This scheme, however, was opposed by certain influential businessmen such as Benjamin Guggenheim, Isidor Straus and John Jacob Astor IV. In order to eliminate those three powerful "enemies", the Jesuits ordered Morgan to build the Titanic and arrange for them to board it for a pre-arranged fatal maiden voyage.

The theory includes the claim that Captain Edward Smith was a "Jesuit temporal coadjutor". The "accidental sinking" was arranged by having Smith's "Jesuit master", Father Francis Browne, board the Titanic and order Smith to run his ship at full speed through an ice field on a moonless night, ignoring any ice warnings including those from the lookouts, with the purpose of hitting an iceberg severely enough to cause the ship to founder and the three businessmen to drown. In other words, the Titanic was built and then sunk, and her crew and passengers sacrificed, to eliminate three men. As evidence of conspiracy on Rome's part, the conspiracy theorists cite Browne asking permission from his Jesuit superior to proceed with some potentially wealthy American benefactors, in which he received an unambiguous reply by telegram saying "GET OFF THAT SHIP – PROVINCIAL", After the sinking, all opposition to the Federal Reserve disappeared. The banking system was established in December 1913, and eight months later the Jesuits had sufficient funding to launch a European war.

== In the United States ==
Jesuit conspiracy theories found fertile ground in the United States, and continue to be propagated there under the broader umbrella of anti-Catholicism in the United States. Anti-Jesuit literature began to be circulated in the early 19th century. In 1835, Samuel B. Morse published Foreign Conspiracy Against the Liberties of the United States, which accused the Jesuits of being Austrian agents sent to destabilize American democracy. A survival of Robert Ware's fabricated oath can be found in the 1851 book The Female Jesuit, or, The Spy in the Family, which revolved around the notion that Jesuits were placing Catholic girls into Protestant families to spy on them. As Catholic immigration to the United States increased, Jesuit prominence in Catholic education resulted in further conspiracy theories. Conspiracy theorist Mitchell Haney Wilcoxon in 1928 alleged that the Jesuits were behind the assassination of Abraham Lincoln, as part of a broader conspiracy to squash American democracy. In more modern times, conspiracy theorists have claimed that Jesuits were behind the assassination of John F. Kennedy.

== See also ==
- List of conspiracy theories
- Alumbrados
- Knights Templar
- Sovereign Military Order of Malta
- Fourth vow
- Anti-Catholicism
- Vatican conspiracy theories
- Pope John Paul I conspiracy theories
- Freemasonry
- Masonic conspiracy theories
