= Ignazio Beschin =

Italian Catholic priest (1880–1952)

Venerable Ignazio Beschin OFM

Priest
- Born: 26 August 1880; San Giovanni Ilarione, Verona, Kingdom of Italy
- Died: 29 October 1952 (aged 72); Chiampo, Vicenza, Italy
- Venerated in: Roman Catholic Church
- Attributes: Franciscan habit

Ignazio Beschin (born Giuseppe Beschin; 26 August 1880 - 29 October 1952) was an Italian Catholic priest and professed member from the Order of Friars Minor. He studied in northern Italian cities for the priesthood while he did his Franciscan formation before serving as a professor in Rome in addition to holding several other important positions. Beschin was noted for his spiritual direction and for having been a good confessor while he spent most of his career spearheading efforts for the beatification cause of Bernardino da Portogruaro (having been the vice-postulator for his order). Beschin also had served in several leadership roles during his time as a priest that saw him move often from the north to Rome.

The beatification cause for the late priest was introduced in late 1978 and he became titled as a Servant of God at the outset. The cause reached a decisive moment in 2017 when he became titled as Venerable after Pope Francis signed a decree acknowledging his heroic virtue.

== Life ==
Giuseppe Beschin was born on 26 August 1880 in San Giovanni Ilarione in the Verona province as the ninth of eleven children to the pious peasants Arcangelo Beschin and Luigia Zanmichele.

He told his sister Maria (whom he was close to) when he was eight of his desire to pursue the priesthood but his older sister did not think that he was prepared for that path. His sister not long after died from typhus due to a spread of the disease and he himself contracted but recovered from typhoid fever around that time not long after her death.

Beschin confided to his parents of his desire to become a priest when he turned thirteen and it was a goal that his parents supported. He commenced his ecclesial studies in Chiampo at the Collegio Serafico after he turned fifteen under the rector Father Pasquale Angelico Melotto (who died in China in 1923 in the missions during a time of persecution). He commenced his novitiate period in the Order of Friars Minor on 12 September 1895 in the San Francesco del Deserto convent as "Ignazio" and was vested in the order's religious habit before making his initial vows in 1896. Beschin underwent his Franciscan formation in Monselice in Padua and Rovinj in Pula-Istria (in Croatia) before relocating to Venice where he made his solemn profession on 2 August 1902. He also did part of his education (going on to earn a doctorate in theological studies) for the priesthood in Rome in the Pontificia Università Antonianum. It was there in Rome that two of his classmates were the Servant of God Ginepro Cocchi and Blessed Gabriele Allegra (both of whom served in China). Beschin received his ordination to the priesthood in Venice on 10 August 1903 from Auxiliary Bishop Aristide Cavallari. The latter ordained him because the Patriarch of Venice had just been elected as Pope Pius X the week before. He celebrated his first Mass as a priest in his hometown on 8 September 1903.

He taught Franciscan students and seminarians in Lonigo and later in Venice after his ordination. He also returned to his alma mater to serve as a professor of canon law. His duties were interrupted due to World War I which saw him serve in the war for 32 months tending to wounded soldiers (as a chaplain) or cleaning the stables and latrines. Beschin was at some point appointed as the order's vice-postulator (an official spearheading Franciscan sainthood causes) and since at least 1919 started to support and promote a cause for Bernardino da Portogruaro. The cause did not launch until 1951 due to some discrepancies that required the order's clarifications to appease the Congregation for Rites. Beschin was also appointed as the general visitor for various Franciscan provinces and was later made the director for the Third Order Franciscans in Rome whom he provided spiritual assistance to. He also provided spiritual assistance to the Daughters of Saint Francis who were based in Pisa. Beschin suffered a serious illness at one point forcing him to take leave; he returned to his teaching duties and other responsibilities after he recovered. He also was appointed as a consultant to the Congregation for Religious and Secular Institutes in the Roman Curia not long after his return to Rome.

Beschin was appointed in 1937 as the Provincial Minister for the Franciscans in the Venetian Province and served two terms (1937–40 and 1940–44) in that role until 1944. Upon his return to Rome at the end of his term he was made the dean for confessors of the Lateran Basilica where he distinguished himself for his qualities as a gentle confessor and popular spiritual director. Beschin became known in Rome for his simple living as well as for his gentleness and discretion. These latter two qualities made him sought after as a confessor and for spiritual direction. These qualities were also among those noted among his peers.

He retired in 1950 due to heart problems but in 1951 at last could open the beatification process for Bernardino da Portogruaro. This came about after he - in summer 1951 - was in Rome clearing up discrepancies that could have impeded the cause. He returned from Rome to the north and made a brief stop in Chiampo. Beschin died on 29 October 1952 in Chiampo due to his heart ailments and his remains were interred though later relocated to the Santa Maria della Pieve church in Chiampo.

== Beatification process ==
The beatification process was activated on 22 September 1978 (one of the few managed in the pontificate of Pope John Paul I) after the Congregation for the Causes of Saints issued a "nihil obstat" (no objections) declaration that enabled for the cause to commence. This also saw Beschin titled as a Servant of God. It opened on a diocesan level in a cognitional process that Bishop Arnoldo Onisto inaugurated on 3 May 1980 and closed soon after sometime in 1981. The C.C.S. validated this process as having abided to their regulations for diocesan processes on 13 November 1992.

The postulation submitted the official Positio dossier to the C.C.S. in 1993 for additional assessment though this did not happen for two decades. Nine theologians gave their approval to the cause on 10 June 2014 as did the C.C.S. cardinal and bishop members at some stage later. Beschin became titled as Venerable on 20 January 2017 after Pope Francis signed a decree that acknowledged that Beschin had practiced heroic virtue throughout his life.

The current postulator for the cause is the Franciscan priest Giovangiuseppe Califano.
