= Pope John Paul I conspiracy theories =

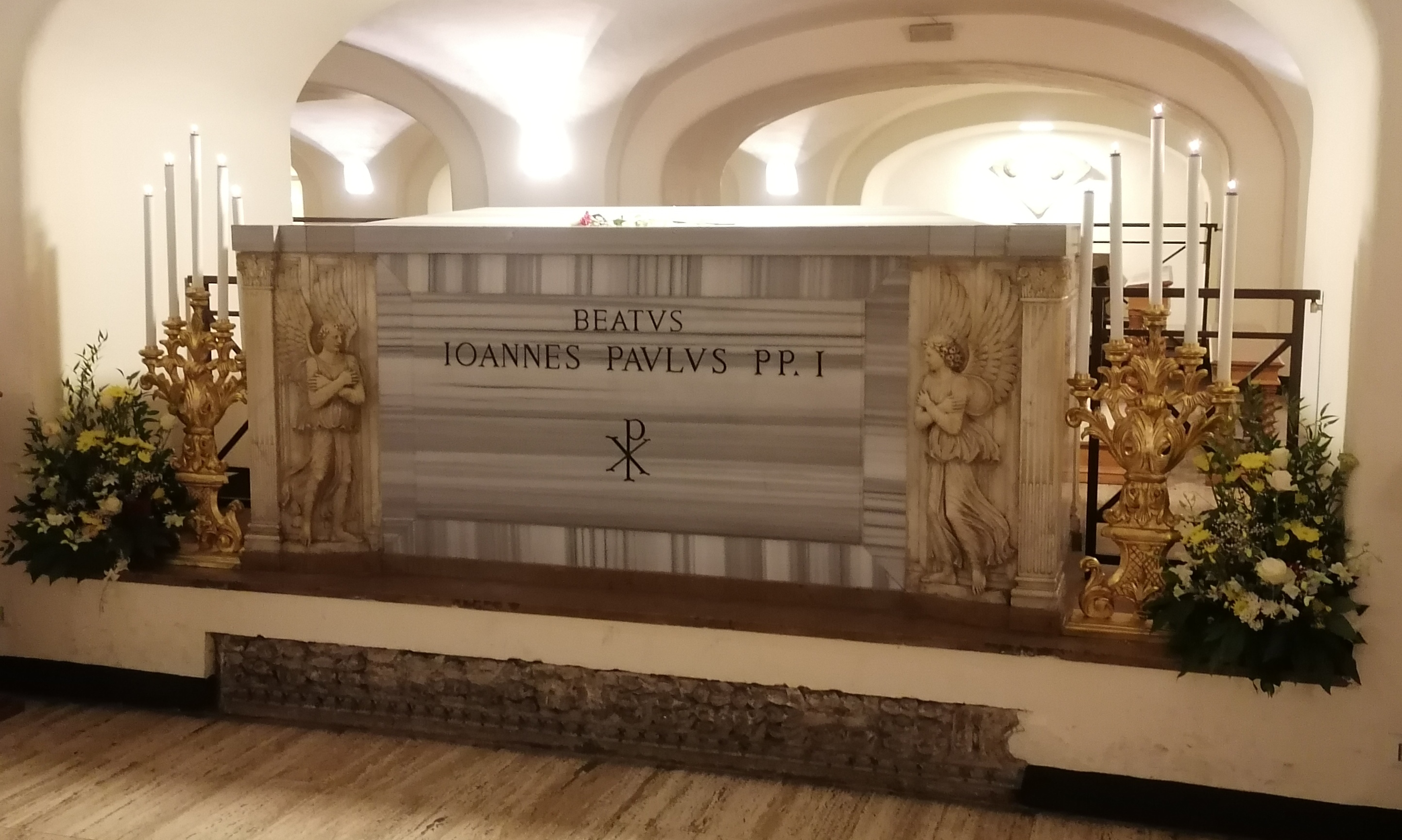
Grave of John Paul I in the Vatican Grottoes, with its plaque updated after his beatification on 4 September 2022.

Pope John Paul I died suddenly on 28 September 1978, 33 days after his election. Following his death, several conspiracy theories have sprung up.

== Rationale ==
Discrepancies in the Vatican's account of the events surrounding Pope John Paul I's death—its inaccurate statements about who found the body; what he had been reading; when, where, and whether an autopsy could be carried out—produced a number of conspiracy theories, many associated with the Vatican Bank, which owned a large share in Banco Ambrosiano.

Some conspiracy theorists connect the pope's death with the image of the "bishop dressed in white" said to have been seen by Lucia Santos and her cousins Jacinta and Francisco Marto during the visitations of Our Lady of Fátima in 1917. In a letter to a colleague, John Paul had said he was deeply moved by having met Lucia and vowed to perform the Consecration of Russia in accordance with her vision.

== Conspiracy theories ==
=== David Yallop ===
British journalist David Yallop's 1984 book In God's Name proposed that the pope had been in danger because of corruption in the Vatican Bank which owned many shares in Banco Ambrosiano. The Vatican Bank lost several hundred million dollars when Banco Ambrosiano collapsed.

Corruption in the Vatican Bank involved the bank's head, Archbishop Paul Marcinkus, along with Roberto Calvi of the Banco Ambrosiano. Marcinkus was indicted in Italy in 1982 as an accessory in the $3.5 billion collapse of Banco Ambrosiano. Calvi was a member of P2, an illegal Italian Masonic lodge. He was found dead in London in 1982, after disappearing just before the corruption became public. His death was initially ruled a suicide and a second inquest – ordered by his family – then returned an open verdict. In October 2002 forensic experts appointed by Italian judges concluded that the banker had been murdered.

In his 2012 book The Power and The Glory: Inside the Dark Heart of John Paul II's Vatican, Yallop writes that Luciani had been given a list of 121 Masons and on 28 September (the day of his death) had advised Jean-Marie Villot, at that time Cardinal Secretary of State, with personnel transfers. Yallop specifically summarized his conspiracy theory in his 1984 book: Three archbishops—Marcinkus, Villot and Cody—conspired with three Mafia types—Calvi, Sindona and Gelli—in the murder of John Paul I. "It was clear that these six men—Marcinkus, Villot, Cody, Calvi, Gelli, and criminal banker Michele Sindona had a great deal to fear if the papacy of John Paul I should continue ... all of them stood to gain in a variety of ways if John Paul I should suddenly die."

In his 1989 book A Thief in the Night, which concludes that the Pope was not murdered but died of a pulmonary embolism, possibly brought on by overwork and neglect, British historian and journalist John Cornwell challenges Yallop's points of suspicion. Yallop's murder theory requires that the pope's body be found at 4:30 or 4:45 a.m., one hour earlier than official reports estimated. He bases this, inter alia, on an early story by Vatican Radio and the Italian news service ANSA that garbled the time and misrepresented the layout of the papal apartments. Yallop says he had testimony from Sister Vincenza Taffarel (the nun who found the pope's body) to this effect but refused to show Cornwell his transcripts.

=== Abbé Georges de Nantes ===
After Yallop's book was published, theologian Abbé Georges de Nantes, who had spent much of his life critiquing the Vatican, tried to build a case for murder, collecting statements from people who knew the pope before and after his election. Abbé's writings go into detail about the banks and about John Paul I's supposed discovery of a number of Freemason priests in the Vatican, along with a number of his proposed reforms and devotion to Our Lady of Fátima.

=== Catholic Traditionalist Movement ===
According to the Catholic Traditionalist Movement (CTM) organization in 2013, their founder Fr. Gommar DePauw was to have gone to Rome to help John Paul I reestablish the Tridentine Mass:

[Fr. DePauw] stated on the 15th anniversary of the pope's death: "Well, I tell you one thing, if he had remained Pope, you wouldn't have me here at the Chapel because with that beautiful official letter signed by the Secretary of State, also came an unofficial message that I better start packing my suitcase, that there was a job waiting for me in Rome, in the Vatican, to help Pope John Paul I bring the Truth back to the Church. Well, it wasn't to be and the Lord, Who knows what He does, obviously wanted me to be in this Chapel. ... What was I going to do in Rome? Well let's just forget it."

Other prominent Traditionalist Catholic websites, not related to CTM, have suggested John Paul I may have been assassinated to prevent restoration of the Tridentine Mass.

=== Charles Murr ===
In his 2017 book The Godmother: Madre Pascalina, Fr. Charles Murr writes about the coincidence that Pope John Paul I had attempted to discipline Cardinal Sebastiano Baggio, who appointed many "liberal" bishops including, later, the defrocked ex-cardinal Theodore McCarrick, and that Baggio was the last person to have seen Pope John Paul I alive.

=== Anthony Raimondi ===
In his book When the Bullet Hits the Bone, which was published in 2019, Anthony Raimondi (who claims to be a nephew of Lucky Luciano) says he helped his cousin Archbishop Paul Marcinkus kill the pope by putting Valium in his tea to knock him out, then poisoning him with cyanide. The reason given was that John Paul had allegedly threatened to expose "a massive stock fraud run by Vatican insiders". Raimondi says that plans were made to also assassinate John Paul II had the latter decided to expose the fraud. Raimondi says that "If they take [the pope's body] and do any type of testing, they will still find traces of the poison in his system."

== See also ==
- List of murdered Popes
- Anti-Catholic conspiracy theories
- Jesuit conspiracy theories
- Vatican conspiracy theories
- Pecorelli list — alleged Freemasons in the Vatican
