= League for Catholic Counter-Reformation =

The League for Catholic Counter-Reformation (French: Ligue de la contre-réforme catholique, CRC) is a nationalist and ultramontane organization founded in 1967 by Georges de Nantes, a former abbot who was suspended a divinis (from administering the sacraments) on 25 August 1966. The movement is composed of two religious communities, one at Saint-Parres-lès-Vaudes in the Aube department of France and the other in Quebec. It is considered a cult in France.

== Beliefs ==
The CRC's stance on doctrinal issues overlaps in many respects with that of other traditionalist Catholic groups, for example in rejecting the Second Vatican Council, rejecting modernism, and accepting the authenticity and message of the Marian apparitions at Fátima. This does not necessarily imply that the CRC's views on all topics are shared widely or in all their particulars within the traditionalist milieu. For example, their belief in the predestination, sanctity, and unique historic role of their founder is a distinguishing characteristic.

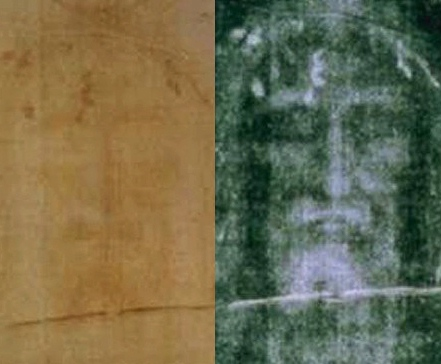
The CRC defends the thesis of the authenticity of the Shroud of Turin.

Georges de Nantes and deacon Bruno Bonnet-Eymard defend the thesis of the authenticity of the Shroud of Turin. According to the CRC, the relic was a victim of "fraud" in the carbon 14 analysis in 1988, fraud "premeditated" by the "mafia" of Freemasons; the 1997 fire, which seriously damaged the Cathedral of Turin, where the Shroud is kept, would be a "final solution" found by "these hidden forces, that Freemasonry".

== Status ==
The community of the Petits Frères du Sacré-Cœur de Jésus, which belongs to the CRC, was considered as a cult by French Commission on Cults in the 1995 report. In 1997, the Belgian parliamentary commission established a list of 189 movements containing the CRC (see Groups referred to as cults in government documents).

On 20 July 2020, the Bishops' Conference of France sent a letter to all the dioceses of France warning of spiritually dangerous errors in what George de Nantes wrote concerning eucharistic doctrine, as well as traumatizing practices on his part towards female communicants. Among the causes for grave concern was what the letter describes as a "sensualist" conception of the union with Christ in the eucharist, leading to a "mystical eroticism" in the act of taking communion (which De Nantes described as a "mystical kiss", and in which he allegedly tried to train female communicants). The bishops' letter described De Nantes' concept of the mystical kiss as an "erotomanic delusion".
