= Illustrissimi =

Work by the future Pope John Paul I

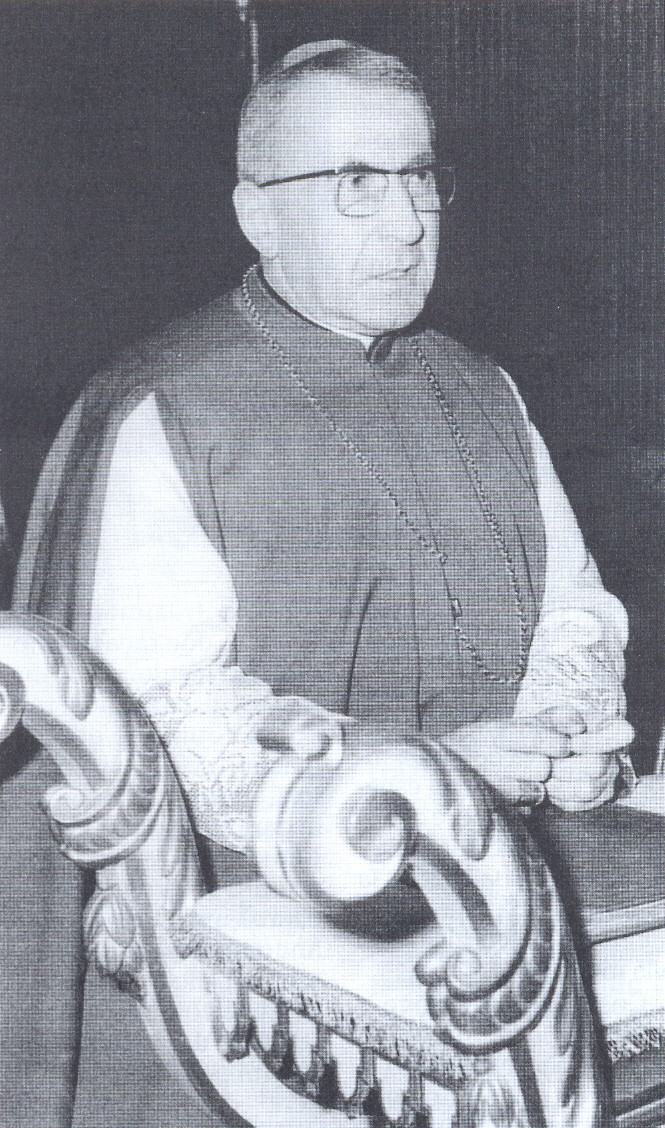
Albino Luciani, Patriarch of Venice

Illustrissimi, or "To the Illustrious Ones", is a collection of letters written by Pope John Paul I when he was Patriarch of Venice. The letters were originally published in the Italian Christian paper Messaggero di S. Antonio between 1972 and 1975, and published in book form in 1976. The book was first published in English in 1978, when Cardinal Luciani (as he was then known) was elected Pope. Since the English translation was only released posthumously (following his brief 33-day papacy), it remains one of the few publicly available English-language writings that offer insights into John Paul I's character and potential papal legacy had he lived longer.

== The letters ==
There are 40 letters in all, mainly to people in Italian history and fiction, but also to internationally well known fictional and historical characters such as Pinocchio, Charles Dickens, Hippocrates and Jesus. Each of the letters tends to be droll and witty, but cleverly turned into a short sermon in order to make a point, whether it is on fashion, pornography, capitalism or the communications industry.

The letters are addressed to the following:

- Charles Dickens
- Mark Twain
- G. K. Chesterton
- Maria Theresa of Austria
- Charles Péguy
- Trilussa
- St. Bernard of Clairvaux
- Johann Wolfgang von Goethe
- King David
- Penelope
- Figaro
- The Pickwick Club
- Pinocchio
- Paolo Diacono
- Gonzalo Fernández de Córdoba
- St. Bernardino of Siena
- St. Francis de Sales
- St. Romedio's Bear
- P. I. Chichikov
- King Lemuel
- Sir Walter Scott
- The Unknown Painter at the Castle
- Hippocrates
- St. Thérèse de Lisieux
- Alessandro Manzoni
- Casella
- Luigi Cornaro
- Aldus Manutius
- St. Bonaventure
- Christopher Marlowe
- St. Luke
- Quintilian
- Guglielmo Marconi
- Giuseppe Gioacchino Belli
- Félix Dupanloup
- Petrarch
- St. Theresa of Ávila
- Carlo Goldoni
- Andreas Hofer
- Jesus Christ

The book was last reissued in 2001.
