= Vincenza Taffarel =

Catholic nun (died 1984)

Vincenza Taffarel (died 1984) was the Catholic nun who found the body of Pope John Paul I. She was brought in as his housekeeper in one of his very first papal acts, and was the first to find him dead. Taffarel was portrayed by Maroussia Frank in The Last Confession, a play by Roger Crane.

== Controversy ==
There have been several differing reports on details surrounding the discovery of the pope's death. These views have resulted in several conspiracy theories in which Taffarel plays a role. When the report of death was first made, the Vatican excluded her from the official reports to avoid possible perceptions of unseemliness resulting from a woman's being in the papal apartments early in the morning.

There has also been confusion over alleged changes in her story. Taffarel told French reporters the morning after the death that she had discovered the Pope's body in the bathroom at 4:45 am. She had entered the room after he had not retrieved his morning coffee that she had left outside his door. Later, it was claimed, she was sworn to secrecy about the event by Cardinal Jean-Marie Villot, before being sent to a nunnery.
