= Aggiornamento =

Tendency within the Roman Catholic Church

Aggiornamento (Italian pronunciation: [addʒornaˈmento]; Italian for "bringing up to date" or "updating") is a term for the renewal and modernization of the Roman Catholic Church that Pope John XXIII hoped would result from the Second Vatican Council. Made famous by John XXIII, it became one of the key terms of the council and was widely used by both bishops and the media.

John XXIII envisaged aggiornamento as a renewal that would contribute to the reunion of all Christians and, in particular, to the renewal of the religious life of Catholics and the bringing up to date of the Church's teaching, discipline and organization.

== John XXIII ==
In his speech of 25 January 1959, announcing his intention of calling a Council, Pope John used the word aggiornamento, but only in reference to his planned revision of the Code of Canon Law. But he soon began using the term to refer to his vision for the Council.

In his first encyclical letter, Ad Petri cathedram, 29 June 1959, speaking of the upcoming Council, he said (§61): "[The bishops] will consider, in particular, the growth of the Catholic faith, the restoration of sound morals among the Christian flock, and appropriate adaptation (aggiornamento) of Church discipline to the needs and conditions of our times."

On 28 June 1961, in an address to a group of Blessed Sacrament Fathers, John XXIII said:

The ecumenical council will reach out and embrace under the widespread wings of the Catholic Church the entire heritage of Our Lord Jesus Christ. Its principal task will be concerned with the condition and modernization (aggiornamento) of the Church after 20 centuries of life. May it be that, side by side with this, God will add also, through whatever edification we may offer, but above all by merit of the omnipotence of the Most High who can draw new chosen sons from the very stones, one other result: a movement toward recomposition of the whole Mystical Flock of Our Lord.

On 1 August 1962, in a speech to a pilgrimage of "ministers of the altar", he said: (translation) "The Ecumenical Council [...] seeks to be a Council of updating, mainly for a deeper knowledge and love of revealed truth, for fervent religious piety, and for holiness of life."

It was a term he used when he was patriarch (archbishop) of Venice. In a letter to the people of Venice of 8 October 1957 about an upcoming diocesan synod, he wrote: (translation) "You have already heard the word "aggiornamento" repeated so many times. You see, our Holy Church, forever young, takes the attitude of following the various twists and turns of the circumstances of life, in order to adapt, to correct, to improve and to become more fervent. That is the nature of the synod, that is its purpose."

In a French encyclopedia article on aggiornamento, Émile Poulat, sociologist of religion and Church historian, claims that John XXIII chose that word to characterize his vision of the Council, because "modernization" would have suggested modernism, and "reform" would have sounded Protestant.

== Paul VI ==
In his first encyclical, Ecclesiam suam, Paul VI recalled the term's association with his predecessor (§50):

We cannot forget Pope John XXIII's word aggiornamento which We have adopted as expressing the aim and object of Our own pontificate. Besides ratifying it and confirming it as the guiding principle of the Ecumenical Council, We want to bring it to the notice of the whole Church. It should prove a stimulus to the Church to increase its ever growing vitality and its ability to take stock of itself and give careful consideration to the signs of the times, always and everywhere "proving all things and holding fast that which is good" with the enthusiasm of youth.

== Benedict XVI ==
On 12 October 2012, in a short address on the occasion of the 50th anniversary of the opening of Vatican II, Pope Benedict XVI said that, while some people have criticized the choice of the term “aggiornamento”, he believed that

the intuition that Blessed John XXIII summarized in that word was and remains exact. Christianity must not be considered as 'something of the past', nor must it be lived with our gaze ever turned back. [...] Christianity is always new. We must never look at it as though it were a tree, fully developed from the mustard seed of the Gospel, that grew, gave its fruit, and one fine day grows old as the sun sets on its life force. Christianity is a tree that is, so to speak, ever “timely”, ever young. And this trend, this aggiornamento does not mean a break with tradition, but expresses its ongoing vitality; it does not mean reducing the faith, debasing it to the fashion of the times, measured by what pleases us, by what pleases public opinion. [...] The Council was a time of grace in which the Holy Spirit taught us that the Church, in her journey through history, must always speak to the people of today.

== Christopher Butler on Aggiornamento ==
In an essay on aggiornamento, Bishop Christopher Butler, a participant in the Second Vatican Council as a Benedictine abbot, described the condition of the Church before the Council and explained the need for aggiornamento. Butler said that the new "pastoral aim, the instinct of a charity that goes beyond all boundaries, the sense of mission not so much to human nature or the abstract human species, but to human persons and the actually existing human family, demanded that our aggiornamento should be conceived of in depth." The bishops at the Council, Butler explained, recognized that great changes in the human environment and world required serious adaptation of the church to respond to this new environment. Otherwise, the church was moving toward "monumental irrelevance". Proclamation of the gospel is the first task of the church, and so it must make this gospel intelligible and relevant to the people of each age, and now to the whole world of diverse peoples represented by their bishops at the Council. For this the Council, in a spirit of aggiornamento, reached back "behind St Thomas himself and the Fathers, to the biblical theology which governs the first two chapters of the ''Constitution on the Church''."

== See also ==
- Spirit of Vatican II
