= Pope John Paul I =

Head of the Catholic Church in 1978

Pope Blessed John Paul I
- Bishop of Rome
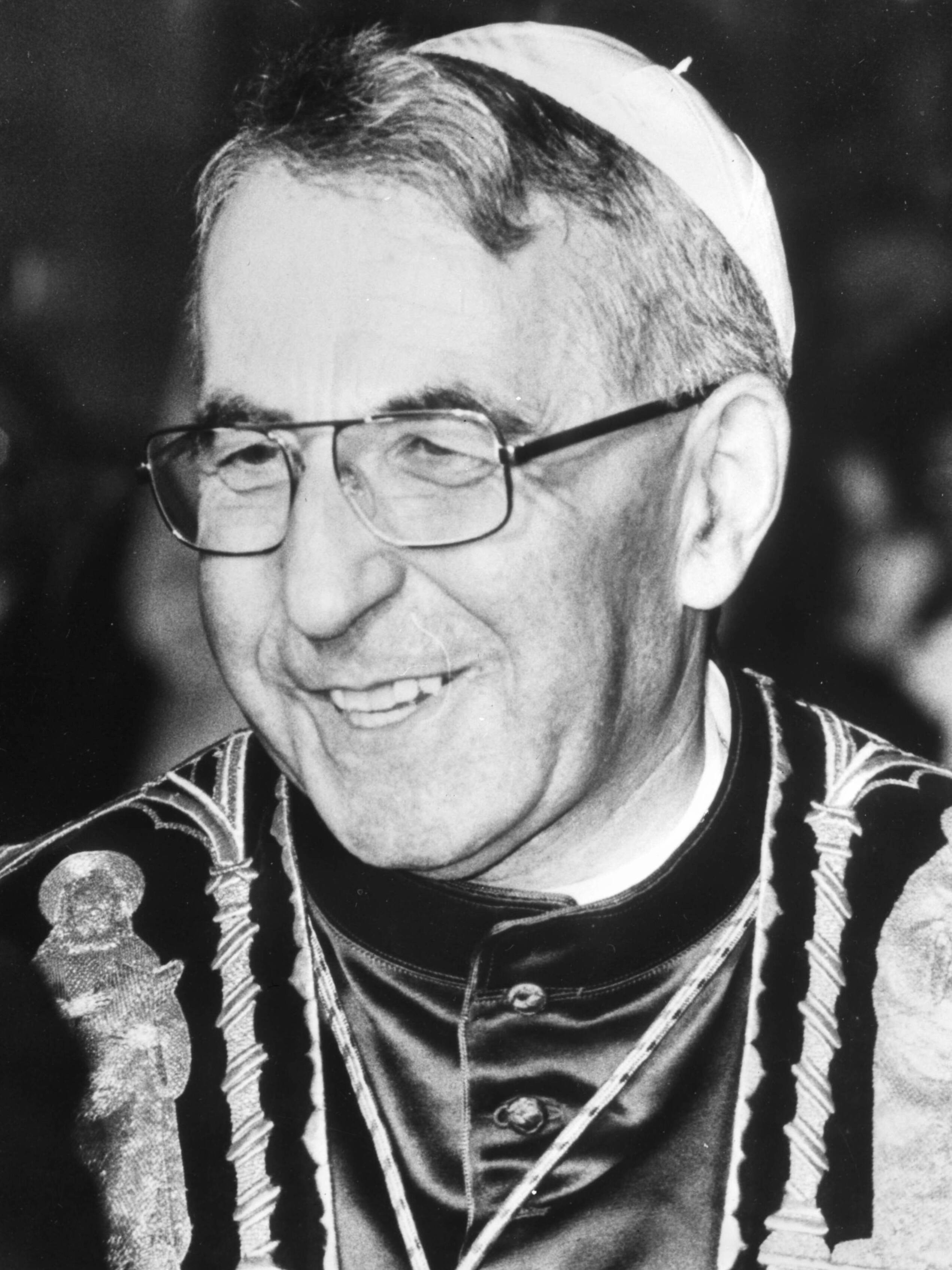
- John Paul I on 19 September 1978
- Church: Catholic Church
- Papacy began: 26 August 1978
- Papacy ended: 28 September 1978
- Predecessor: Paul VI
- Successor: John Paul II
- Previous posts: Pro-Vicar General of Belluno (1948‍–‍1954); Vicar General of Belluno (1954‍–‍1958); Bishop of Vittorio Veneto (1958‍–‍1969); Patriarch of Venice (1969‍–‍1978); Vice-President of the Italian Episcopal Conference (1972‍–‍1976); Cardinal Priest of San Marco (1973‍–‍1978)

Orders
- Ordination: 7 July 1935 by Giosuè Cattarossi
- Consecration: 27 December 1958 by John XXIII
- Created cardinal: 5 March 1973 by Paul VI
- Rank: Cardinal priest

Personal details
- Born: Albino Luciani; 17 October 1912 Forno di Canale, Kingdom of Italy
- Died: 28 September 1978 (aged 65) Apostolic Palace, Vatican City
- Buried: Vatican Grottoes, St. Peter's Basilica
- Education: Pontifical Gregorian University (PhD)
- Motto: Humilitas (Latin for 'Humility')
- Signature: John Paul I's signature

- Coat of arms: John Paul I's coat of arms

Sainthood
- Feast day: 26 August
- Venerated in: Catholic Church
- Title as Saint: Confessor of the Faith
- Beatified: 4 September 2022; St. Peter's Square, Vatican City by Pope Francis
- Attributes: Papal vestments; Pallium
- Patronage: Canale d'Agordo; Diocese of Vittorio Veneto; Patriarchate of Venice; Catechists

Ordination history
History
Diaconal ordination
- Date: 2 February 1935
Priestly ordination
- Ordained by: Giosuè Cattarossi
- Date: 7 July 1935
- Place: Church of San Pietro, Belluno
Episcopal consecration
- Principal consecrator: Pope John XXIII
- Co-consecrators: Girolamo Bortignon; Gioacchino Muccin
- Date: 27 December 1958
- Place: St. Peter's Basilica, Vatican City
Cardinalate
- Elevated by: Pope Paul VI
- Date: 5 March 1973

Pope John Paul I (Note: Latin: Ioannes Paulus I; Italian: Giovanni Paolo I; Venetian: Joani Poło I.) (born Albino Luciani; (Note: Italian pronunciation: [alˈbiːno luˈtʃaːni].) 17 October 1912 – 28 September 1978) was head of the Catholic Church and sovereign of Vatican City from 26 August 1978 until his death 33 days later. His reign is among the shortest in papal history, giving rise to the first year of three popes since 1605. John Paul I remains the most recent Italian-born pope, the last in a succession of such popes that started with Clement VII in 1523. He was the first pope to have been born in the 20th century, as well as the last pope to die in it.

Before the August 1978 papal conclave that elected him, he expressed his desire not to be elected, telling those close to him that he would decline the papacy if elected, but he eventually felt an obligation to accept his election. He was the first pontiff to have a double papal name, choosing "John Paul" in honour of his two immediate predecessors, John XXIII and Paul VI. He explained that he was indebted to John XXIII and to Paul VI for naming him a bishop and a cardinal, respectively.

His two immediate successors, John Paul II and Benedict XVI, later recalled the warm qualities of the late pontiff in several addresses. In Italy, he is remembered with the appellatives of Il Papa del sorriso (transl. "The Pope of the smile") and Il sorriso di Dio (transl. "The smile of God"). Time magazine and other publications referred to him as "The September Pope". He is also referred to in Italy as Papa Luciani to distinguish him from his successor of the same papal name. In his hometown of Canale d'Agordo, a museum built and named in his honour is dedicated to his life and brief papacy.

John Paul I was declared a Servant of God by his successor, John Paul II, on 23 November 2003. Pope Francis confirmed John Paul's heroic virtue on 8 November 2017 and titled him venerable. Francis presided over John Paul's beatification on 4 September 2022.

== Early life and education ==
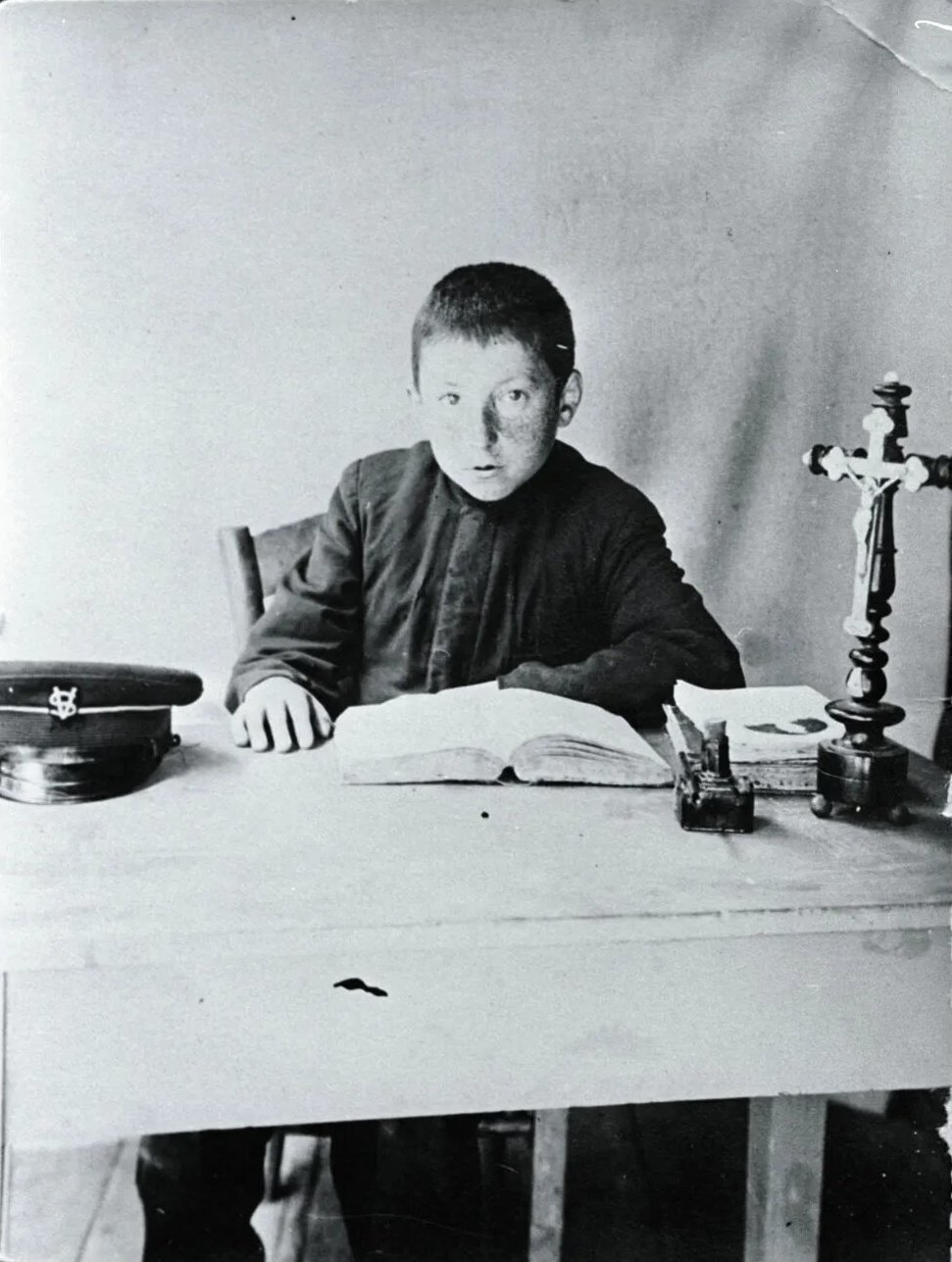
Albino Luciani approximately at the age of 10, c. 1922–23

Albino Luciani was born on 17 October 1912 in Forno di Canale (now Canale d'Agordo) in Belluno, a province of the Veneto region in Northern Italy. He was the son of Giovanni Luciani (c. 1872–1952), a bricklayer, and Bortola Tancon (c. 1879–1947). Albino was followed by two brothers, Federico (1915–1916) and Edoardo (1917–2008), and a sister, Antonia (1920–2010). He was baptised on the day he was born by the midwife because he was thought to be in danger of death. The solemn rites of baptism were formalised in the parish church two days later.

Luciani was a restless child. In 1922, aged 10, he was awestruck when a Capuchin friar came to his village to preach the Lenten sermons. From that moment, he decided that he wanted to become a priest and went to his father to ask for his permission. His father agreed and said to him: "I hope that when you become a priest you will be on the side of the workers, for Christ Himself would have been on their side".

Luciani entered the minor seminary of Feltre in 1923, where his teachers found him "too lively", and later went on to the major seminary of Belluno. During his stay at Belluno, he asked for permission to join the Jesuits, but it was refused by the seminary's rector, Bishop Giosuè Cattarossi.

== Ordination and teaching career ==
Ordained a priest on 7 July 1935, Luciani then served as a curate in his native Forno de Canale before becoming a professor and the vice-rector of the Belluno seminary in 1937. Among the different subjects, he taught dogmatic and moral theology, canon law and sacred art.

In 1941, Luciani started to work on a Doctorate of Sacred Theology from the Pontifical Gregorian University. This required at least one year's attendance in Rome. However, the Belluno seminary's superiors wanted him to continue teaching during his doctoral studies. The situation was resolved by a special dispensation by Pope Pius XII on 27 March 1941. His thesis (The origin of the human soul according to Antonio Rosmini) largely attacked Rosmini's theology and earned him his doctorate magna cum laude in 1947.

In 1947, he was named chancellor to Bishop Girolamo Bortignon of Belluno, and was appointed a Supernumerary Privy Chamberlain of His Holiness, the most junior class of papal prelate, on 15 December. In 1954, he was named the vicar general for the Belluno diocese. Luciani was nominated for the position of bishop several times, but he was passed over each time due to his poor health, stature, and resigned appearance. In 1949, he published a book titled Catechesis in crumbs. This book, his first, was about teaching the truths of the faith in a simple way, directly and comprehensible to all people.

== Episcopate ==
On 15 December 1958, Luciani was appointed Bishop of Vittorio Veneto by Pope John XXIII. He received his episcopal consecration later that month from Pope John XXIII himself, with Bishops Bortignon and Gioacchino Muccin serving as the co-consecrators. Luciani took possession of the diocese on 11 January 1959, with Humilitas (Humility) as his episcopal motto. In his first address to his new diocese, he told the people that he sought to be "a bishop who is a teacher and a servant".

As a bishop, he participated in all the sessions of the Second Vatican Council (1962–1965). On 18 April 1962, Luciani issued a pastoral letter, entitled "Notes on the Council", to alert the faithful to the structure of the proceedings and the overall purpose of the council, chiefly, the doctrinal and practical issues.

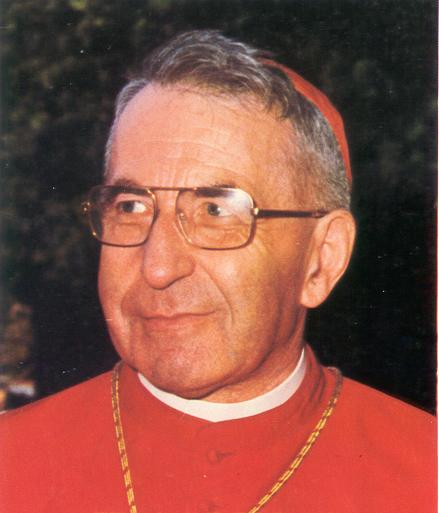
Luciani in 1969

Between 1965 and 1969, he faced the schism of Montaner: almost all the residents of Montaner, a frazione of Sarmede, decided to renounce Catholicism and embrace the Orthodox religion, because they had a great disagreement with their bishop, Luciani. The people disagreed with Luciani's decision to appoint John Gava as a new priest in 1966 since the people wanted their own choice, rather than the one Luciani had settled on. The people then wanted a compromise: make their choice the parish's vice-rector if not parish priest. However, Monsignor Luciani said the small village needed only one priest, and he was the sole authority on priestly selection. Continually, he recommended new priests, but each was denied by the people. Finally, he was escorted by the police and took the Eucharist from the Montaner church, leaving the church unblessed and waiting for their next move.

In 1966, Luciani visited Burundi in East Africa.

On 15 December 1969, Luciani was appointed the new patriarch of Venice by Pope Paul VI, taking possession of his new archdiocese the following February. That same month he received honorary citizenship of the town of Vittorio Veneto, where he had previously served as bishop.

=== 1971 Synod of Bishops ===
At the Synod of Bishops held in Rome in 1971, to which he was personally invited by Pope Paul VI, Luciani suggested to the bishops assembled that dioceses in countries that were heavily industrialised should relinquish around 1% of all their income to Third World nations to be given "not as alms, but something that is owed. Owed to compensate for the injustices that our consumer-oriented world is committing towards the 'world on the way to development' and to in some way make reparation for social sin, of which we must become aware".

== Cardinalate ==
Pope Paul VI created Luciani the Cardinal-Priest of San Marco in the consistory on 5 March 1973.

During his time as Patriarch of Venice, Luciani clashed with priests who supported the liberalisation of divorce in Italy, eventually suspending some of them. At the same time, he was opposed to the 1974 referendum restricting divorce after it had been liberalised, feeling that such a move would fail and simply point out a divided Church with declining influence.

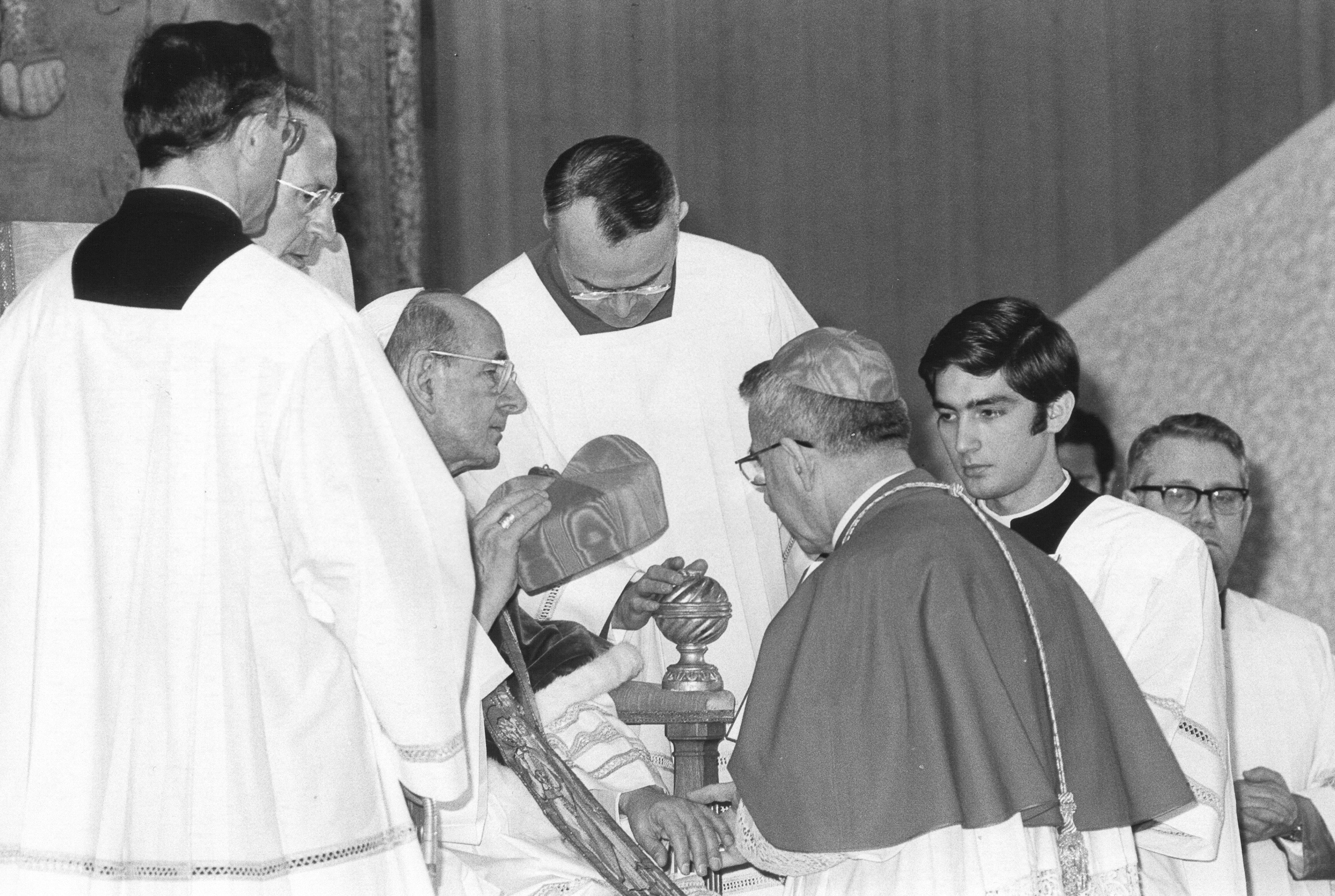
Pope Paul VI makes Luciani a cardinal in 1973.

In 1975, Luciani travelled to Germany in May. Later that year (6–21 November), he visited Brazil, where he met with members of the clergy, including Aloísio Lorscheider. Upon returning to Italy, he suffered an embolus in his right eye. Luciani also visited Fatima a few months later. While there, he met with Sister Lucia dos Santos, the surviving visionary of three children who in 1917 claimed to see apparitions of the Blessed Virgin Mary (revered in this form under the title Our Lady of Fatima). When Luciani met Sister Lucia, she referred to him as "Holy Father". This greeting shocked the humble cardinal. In January 1976, he published Illustrissimi ("To the Illustrious Ones"), a collection of letters penned by him in previous years, whimsically addressed to historical and literary figures such as Dickens, G. K. Chesterton, Maria Theresa of Austria, Teresa of Avila, Goethe, Figaro, Pinocchio, the Pickwick Club, King David, and Jesus.

In 1975, he suggested disciplinary punishment for priests who spoke out in favour of the Communist Party or other leftist groups.

In 1976, Luciani sold a gold cross and pectoral gold chain that Pope John XXIII had given to him (which once belonged to Pope Pius XII before him) to raise money for disabled children. He also urged fellow priests in Venice to sell their valuables to contribute to this cause and as a way for them to live simply and humbly. As Patriarch of Venice, Luciani established family counselling clinics to assist the poor in coping with marital, financial and sexual problems.

In 1978, he forbade the Tridentine Mass in the Archdiocese of Venice.

== Papacy ==
=== Election ===
Pope Paul VI died on 6 August 1978, ending a papacy of fifteen years. Luciani was summoned to Rome for the conclave to elect the new pope. Time reported that the Dean of the college, Carlo Confalonieri, who was excluded from participating because of age, had been the first to suggest Luciani.

Luciani was elected on the fourth ballot of the August 1978 papal conclave. Luciani had previously said to his secretary, Father Diego Lorenzi, and Father Prospero Grech (later a cardinal himself), that he would decline the papacy if elected, and that he intended to vote for Aloísio Lorscheider, whom he met in Brazil. Cardinal Sin of the Philippines told him: "You will be the new pope."

However, when he was asked by Jean-Marie Villot if he accepted his election, Luciani replied, "May God forgive you for what you have done", but accepted the election. After his election, when Cardinal Sin paid him homage, the new pope said: "You were a prophet, but my reign will be a short one". On the balcony of St Peter's Basilica, Pericle Felici announced that the cardinals had elected Albino Luciani, Patriarch of Venice, who had chosen the name Pope John Paul I. It was the first time that a pope had chosen a double name. He later explained that the double name was taken to gratefully honour his two immediate predecessors: John XXIII, who had named him a bishop, and Paul VI, who had named him Patriarch of Venice and Cardinal.

He was also the only pope to have added the ordinal number "I" to his chosen papal name.

In the aftermath of the election, the pope confided to his brother Edoardo that his first thought was to call himself "Pius XIII" in honour of Pope Pius XI, but he gave up on the idea, worried that the traditionalist members of the Church might exploit this choice of regnal name.

Observers have suggested that his selection was a compromise to satisfy rumoured divisions among seemingly rival camps within the College of Cardinals:

- Conservatives and Curialists supporting Giuseppe Siri, who favoured a more conservative interpretation or even reversal of controversial ideas being promoted as "in the spirit of Vatican II" but which had never been discussed at the recent council.
- Those who favoured a more liberal interpretation of Vatican II's reforms along with some Italian cardinals who supported Giovanni Benelli, who had created some opposition due to alleged "autocratic" tendencies.
- The cardinals within the increasingly international College of Cardinals, beyond the Italians who were experiencing diminished influence, such as Karol Wojtyła.

During the days following the conclave, the cardinals were generally elated at the reaction to Pope John Paul I, some of them happily saying that they had elected "God's candidate". Argentine Eduardo Francisco Pironio stated, "We were witnesses of a moral miracle." Mother Teresa, commenting about the new pope, "He has been the greatest gift of God, a sun beam of God's love shining in the darkness of the world." British primate Cardinal Basil Hume declared: "Once it had happened, it seemed totally and entirely right ... We felt as if our hands were being guided as we wrote his name on the paper".

A dramatic event occurred soon after the election when the leader of the delegation from the Russian Orthodox Church, Metropolitan Nikodim (Rotov) of Leningrad, collapsed and died during an audience with the Pope on 5 September 1978. The new pope immediately came over and prayed for him.

=== Church policies ===
==== Six-point plan ====
After he became pope, he had set six plans down which would dictate his pontificate:

- To renew the church through the policies implemented by Vatican II.
- To revise canon law.
- To remind the church of its duty to preach the Gospel.
- To promote church unity without watering down doctrine.
- To promote dialogue.
- To encourage world peace and social justice.

==== Humanising the papacy ====
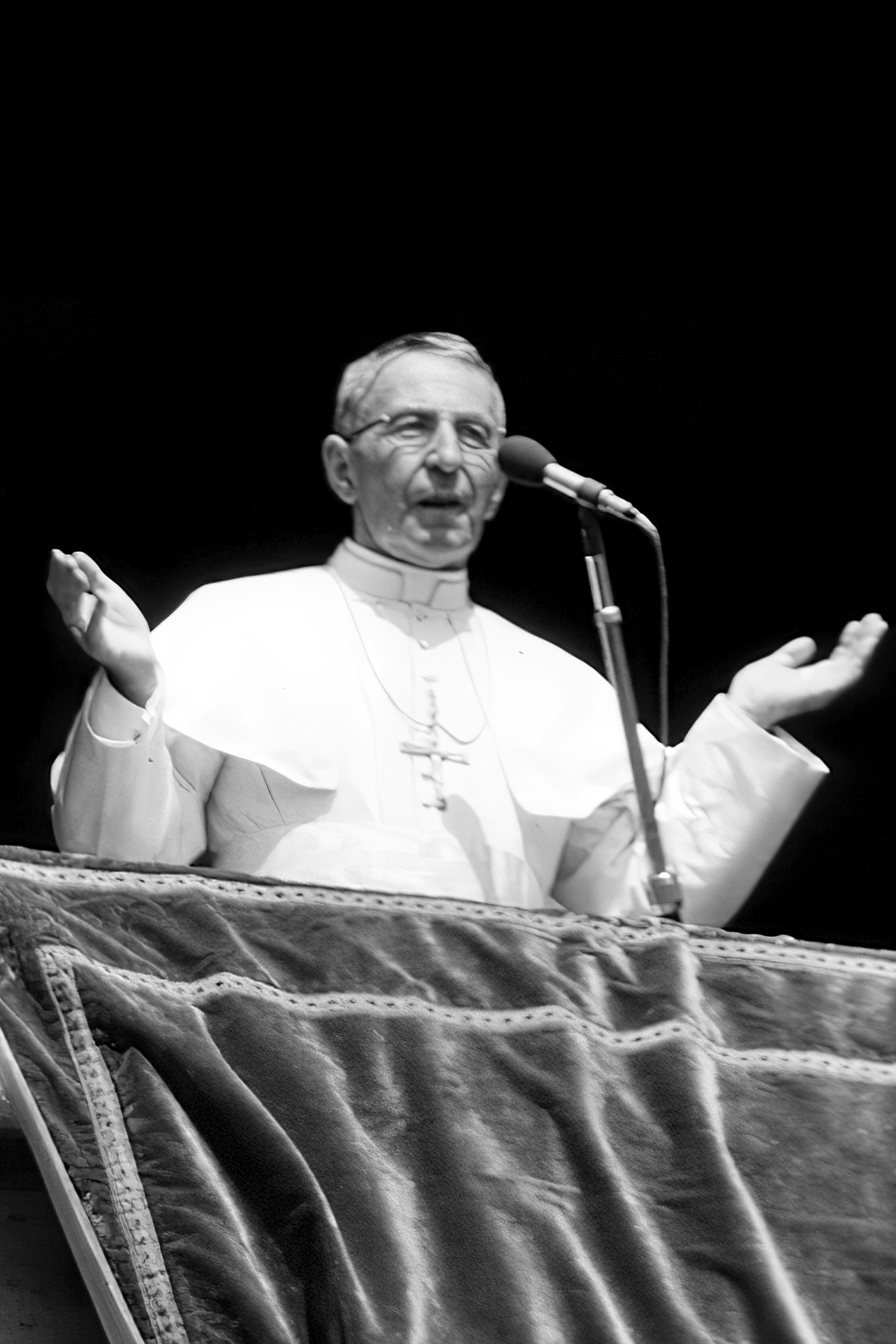
John Paul I photographed from his study window in 1978

After his election, John Paul I quickly made several decisions that would "humanise" the office of the pope. He was the first modern pope to speak in the singular form, using 'I' instead of the royal we. However, the official records of his speeches were often rewritten in a more formal style by aides, who reinstated the royal we in press releases and L'Osservatore Romano. He initially refused to use the sedia gestatoria until others convinced him of its need to allow himself to be seen by crowds. He was the last pope to use it. He was the first pope to refuse to be crowned. Instead of a coronation, he inaugurated his papacy with a "papal inauguration" where he received the papal pallium as the symbol of his position as Bishop of Rome.

=== Moral theology ===
British researcher Paul Spackman described Luciani as a man of "doctrinal rigour leavened by pastoral and social open-mindedness," who left behind a "legacy of gentle and compassionate bridge-building."

==== Contraception ====
Luciani had mixed feelings regarding the traditional stance on contraception. In 1968, as Bishop of Vittorio Veneto, he submitted a report to his predecessor as the Patriarch of Venice, Giovanni Urbani, that argued that the contraceptive pill should be permitted. It was agreed on by fellow Veneto bishops and was later submitted to Pope Paul VI. When Humanae vitae was released, re-affirming the teaching of the Church against artificial contraception, Luciani defended that document. Nevertheless, he seemed to contradict that defence in a letter he wrote to his diocese four days after the encyclical's release. In May 1978, Luciani was invited to speak at a Milanese conference to celebrate the 10th anniversary of the encyclical. He refused to speak at the event or even attend it.

Raymond and Lauretta take a different view, saying that while serving as Patriarch of Venice, "Luciani was intransigent with his upholding of the teaching of the Church and severe with those, who through intellectual pride and disobedience paid no attention to the Church's prohibition of contraception, though while not condoning the sin, he was patient with those who sincerely tried and failed to live up to the Church's teaching."

==== Abortion ====
In his letter to Carlo Goldoni from the book Illustrissimi, Luciani took a critical perspective of abortion and argued that it violated God's law and that it went against the deepest aspirations of women, profoundly disturbing them.

==== Artificial insemination ====
In an interview before the death of Pope Paul VI in 1978, when asked for his reaction to the birth of the first test-tube baby Louise Brown, Luciani expressed concerns about the possibility that artificial insemination could lead to women being used as "baby factories", but he refused to condemn the parents, noting that they simply wanted to have a baby.

His view was that "from every side the press is sending its congratulations to the English couple and best wishes to their baby girl. In imitation of God, who desires and loves human life, I too offer my best wishes to the baby girl. As for her parents, I do not have any right to condemn them; subjectively, if they have acted with the right intention and in good faith, they may even obtain great merit before God for what they have decided on and asked the doctors to carry out." Luciani added, "Getting down, however, to the act in itself, and good faith aside, the moral problem which is posed is: is extrauterine fertilization in vitro or in a test tube, licit?... I do not find any valid reasons to deviate from this norm, by declaring licit the separation of the transmission of life from the marriage act."

==== Divorce ====
In 1969, Luciani was cautious of de facto relationships as a lesser evil to divorce. He said that unions like those should not be the same as marriage. However, he added that "there are, in undeniably pathological family situations, painful cases. To remedy that, some propose a divorce, which, conversely, would aggravate this. But some remedy outside of divorce, you can't really find? Once the legitimate family is protected and made a place of honour, you will not be able to recognise with all appropriate precautions some civil effect to de facto unions."

==== Homosexuality ====
In a 1974 interview, while he was the Patriarch of Venice, Luciani upheld the traditional line: "A sexuality that is worthy of man must be a part of love for a person of a different sex with the added commitments of fidelity and indissolubility."

==== Ordination of women ====
In a 1975 talk Luciani gave to a group of sisters, he expressed his views on the ordination of women into the priesthood:

You will ask: what about... the priesthood itself? I can say to you: Christ bestowed the pastoral ministry on men alone, on his apostles. Did he mean this to be valid only for a short time, almost as though he made allowances for the prejudice about the inferiority of women prevalent in his time? Or did he intend it to be valid always? Let it be very clear: Christ never accepted the prejudice about the inferiority of women: they are always admirable figures in the Gospels, more so than the apostles themselves. The priesthood, however, is a service given by means of spiritual powers and not a form of superiority. Through the will of Christ, women — in my judgement — carry out a different, complementary, and precious service in the church, but they are not "possible priests" ... That does not do wrong to women.

=== Communism ===
John Paul I reiterated the official views of the church regarding Marxism and Catholicism being incompatible and believed it to be a "weapon to disobey" the Christian faith. As Patriarch of Venice, he struggled at times with Marxist students who were demanding changes in Venetian policies. He also forbade those factions that were Marxist from threatening the faith.

=== Interfaith dialogue ===
==== Islam ====
John Paul I was a friend to the Muslim people and, as Patriarch of Venice, said to Catholics that faithful Muslims had the "right to build a mosque" to practise their faith in the archdiocese.

=== Universal call to holiness ===
Luciani stressed the need throughout his time as Bishop of Vittorio Veneto to answer the universal call to holiness as was an invitation in the Second Vatican Council. He believed that sainthood was something that all Catholics could achieve if they led a life of service to God. Luciani said there were no barriers to sainthood and discussed this theme of the council in a homily on 6 January 1962: "We are called by God to be true saints". Luciani stressed the importance of this and said God invites Catholics and obligates them to sainthood. He also said that by professing love for God, Catholics say: "my God I want to be holy, I will strive to be holy".

=== Mercy ===
During his brief pontificate, John Paul I spoke three times on the concept of God's mercy. In his General Audience address on 13 September 1978, the pope said that the entire point of mercy is "to surrender to God" through faith in him, which goes about "transforming one's life" in the fight against sin, and the pursuit of holiness. The pope continued that "God has so much tenderness for us" in which "He begs me to repent" from sin to return to God's embrace. The pope concluded that "the Church too must be good; good to everyone" in its outreach to the faithful.

John Paul I, in his Angelus address on 24 September 1978, spoke about the importance of doing good deeds through charitable and merciful acts in society, to make the world more just, and to improve the overall conditions of society. The pope elaborated that it was important to "try to be good and to infect others with a goodness imbued with the meekness and love taught by Christ" while seeking to give one's all in service to others. The pope further pointed out Christ's example on the Cross, in which he forgave and excused those who persecuted, referring to it as a sentiment which "would help society so much" if put into constant practice.

The pope also spoke about mercy in his address at the General Audience on 27 September 1978. He referred to God as "infinite good" capable of providing for mankind's "eternal happiness" in his love for humanity. He continued that it may be "difficult to love others; we do not find them likeable, they have offended us and hurt us", though said that forgiveness between brothers and sisters was very important for unity and peace among people. Additionally, the pope referred to the seven corporal and spiritual acts of mercy, which he said acted as a guide for Christians, though highlighting the fact that "the list is not complete and it would be necessary to update it" as times change since global situations change. The pope concluded that justice adds to charity, which is linked to the theme of mercy.

=== Interpretation of Vatican II ===
Luciani had attended all sessions of the Second Vatican Council (1962–65) while he was the Bishop of Vittorio Veneto. He had hoped that the council would highlight "Christian optimism" in terms of Christ's teachings against the culture of relativism. He denounced a fundamental ignorance of the "basic elements of the faith" — it was this point that he wished to focus on as opposed to secularism throughout the world.

Luciani told his niece that his diocese actually contained people "of three councils":

- Those stuck at Vatican I, if not actually at the Council of Trent.
- Those "who gladly accept the aggiornamento of Vatican II, seeing it as a grace to improve the relationship between the church and the world."
- "A little group who make the council say things that in reality it does not say, planning a radical rush toward another council that still does not exist, a Vatican III."

Shortly after becoming Pope, he laid out the priorities for his papacy. First and foremost would be the continued implementation of Vatican II.

In regard to religious freedom, Luciani wrote about the council's declaration, Dignitatis humanae. In his writings, he said that there is only one true religion that must be followed and no other, affirming that Jesus Christ is the truth, and that the truth will set one truly free. However, he stated that those that who would not accept the one true Catholic faith, for whatever reason, were indeed free to profess their own religion for various reasons. He continued to state that religious freedom must be freely exercised by the individual: "The choice of religious belief must be free. The freer and more earnest the choice, the more those that embrace the Faith will feel honoured. These are rights, natural rights. Rights always come hand in hand with duties. The non Catholics have the right to profess their religion and I have the duty to respect their right as a private citizen, as a priest, as a bishop and as a State".

=== International travels ===
On 12 September 1978, Mario Casariego y Acevedo of Guatemala invited the pope to visit Guatemala in 1979. The pope was said to have thanked him for the invitation but did not provide a response. The week before this, the pope said he was unable to accept an invitation to the Latin American Episcopal Conference in Puebla, Mexico for October due to his schedule.

=== Beatification processes ===
No candidate was beatified or canonised in John Paul's brief pontificate, but José Gras y Granollers, Juan Vicente Zengotita-Bengoa Lasuen and Giuseppe Beschin were titled Servant of God on 22 September 1978.

=== Personality ===
John Paul I was regarded as a skilled communicator and writer. His book Illustrissimi, written while he was a cardinal, is a series of letters to a wide collection of historical and fictional persons. Among those still available are his letters to Jesus, King David, Figaro the Barber, Empress Maria Theresa and Pinocchio. Others "written to" included Mark Twain, Charles Dickens and Christopher Marlowe. He was also well-read, and was known for reading several newspapers each morning, including one from the Veneto region, before beginning his day.

John Paul I impressed people with his personal warmth. He was seen by some as an intellectual lightweight not up to the responsibilities of the papacy, although David Yallop (In God's Name) says that this is the result of a whispering campaign by people in the Vatican who were opposed to Luciani's policies. In the words of John Cornwell, "they treated him with condescension"; one senior cleric discussing Luciani said "they have elected Peter Sellers." Critics contrasted his sermons mentioning Pinocchio to the learned intellectual discourses of Pius XII or Paul VI. Visitors spoke of his isolation and loneliness and the fact that he was the first pope in decades not to have previously held either a diplomatic role (like Pius XI and John XXIII) or Curial role (like Pius XII and Paul VI) in the Church.

According to his aides, he was not the naive idealist his critics made him out to be. Giuseppe Caprio, the substitute Papal Secretary of State, said that John Paul I quickly accepted his new role and performed it with confidence.

John Paul I admitted that the prospect of the papacy had daunted him to the point that other cardinals had to encourage him to accept it. He refused to have the millennium-old traditional papal coronation or wear the papal tiara, instead having a simplified inauguration mass. John Paul I adopted as his motto the Latin word Humilitas ('Humility'). In the notable Angelus he delivered on the first full day of his papacy, 27 August 1978, he impressed the world with his natural friendliness.

Sister Margherita Marin, who worked in the Vatican during Luciani's papacy, later said that the pope had admitted the sisters into his apartment chapel for morning Mass, unlike his predecessor Paul VI, who had only admitted his secretaries. Marin also said that Luciani spoke in the Venetian dialect with the Venetian sisters to make them more comfortable. She noted that the pope showed his sense of humour when he joked with the sisters about the questionable quality of pictures of him in newspapers: "But you see how they got me".

== Death ==
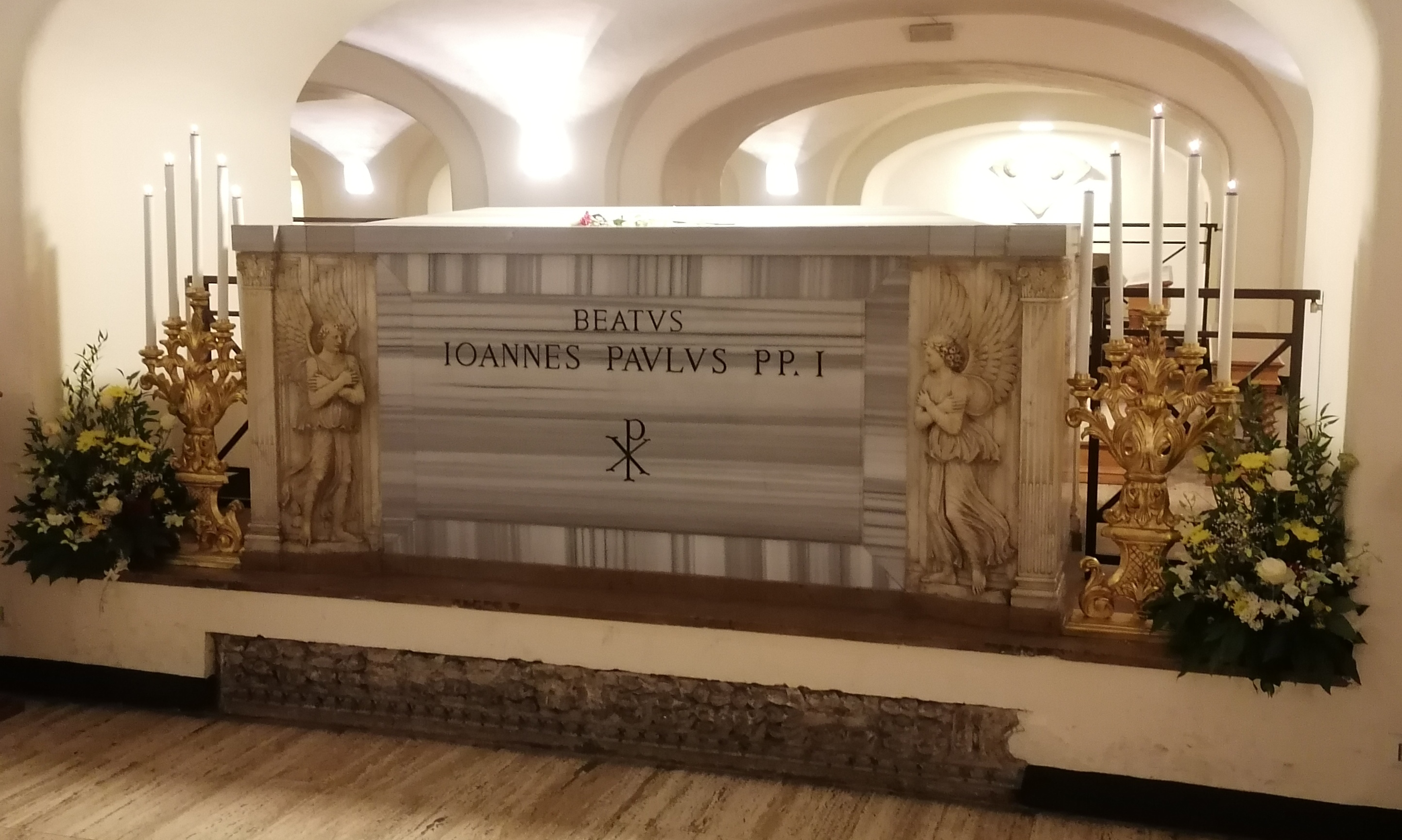
Tomb of John Paul I in the Vatican Grottoes following his 2022 beatification

Around 10 p.m. on the day of his death, the pope learned that several young neo-fascists had fired upon a group of young people reading L'Unità, the communist newspaper, outside one of the party's offices in Rome. One boy was killed while another was seriously wounded. The pope lamented to Bishop John Magee, "Even the young are killing each other." He later retired to his room to read Thomas à Kempis's The Imitation of Christ in bed.

On 29 September 1978, on what would have been the 35th day of his pontificate, John Paul I was found dead in his bed with reading material and a bedside lamp still lit. It was likely he suffered a heart attack the night before. Upon the global announcement of the news, Bolivia declared six days of mourning, while Spain, Zaire and Lebanon all declared three days of mourning and the Dominican Republic declared two days of mourning.

John Paul I's funeral was held in Saint Peter's Square on 4 October 1978, celebrated by Carlo Confalonieri. In his eulogy of the late pope, he described him as a flashing comet who briefly lit up the church. He then was laid to rest in the Vatican Grottoes.

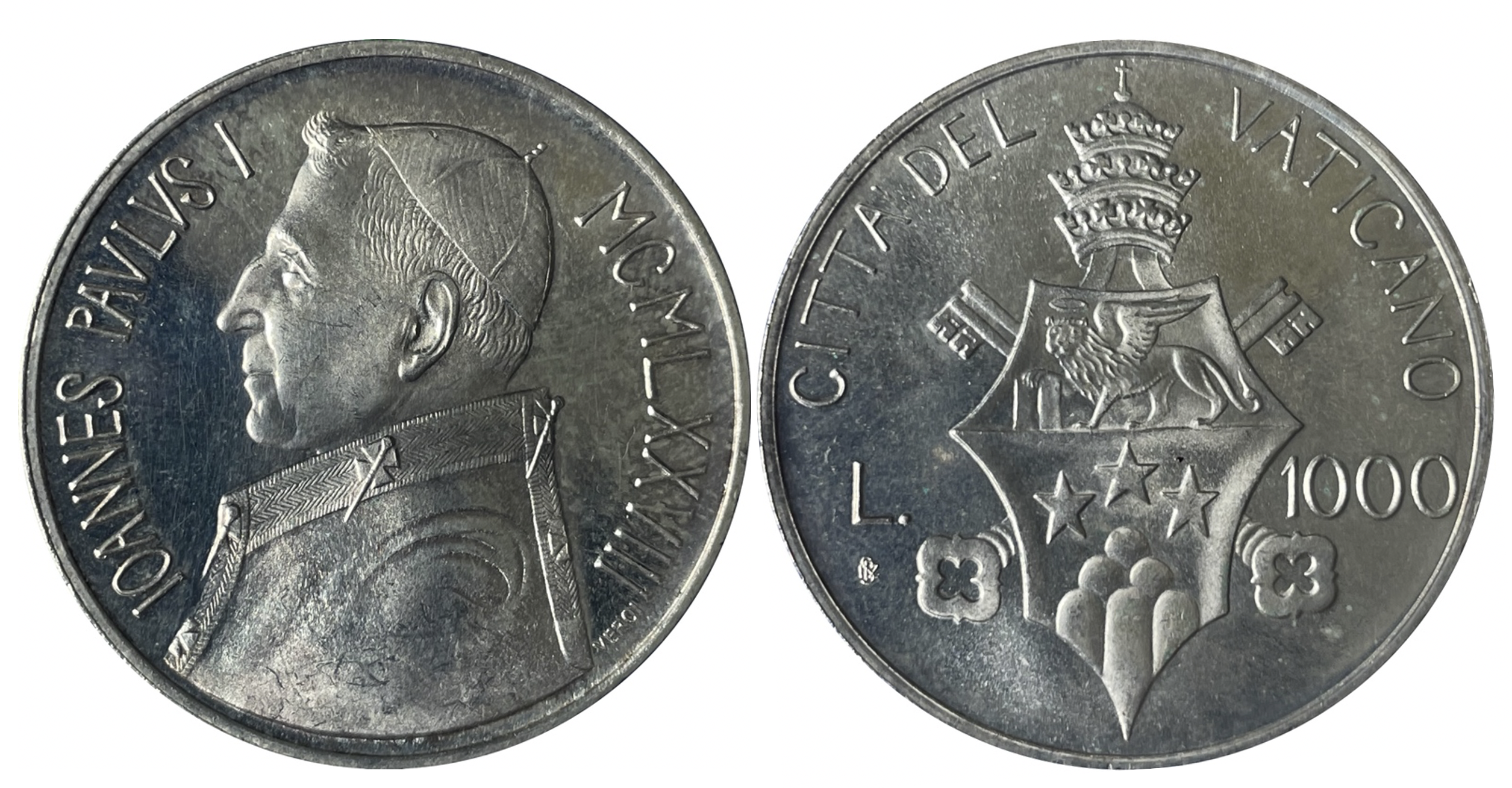
1000 lire silver coin with a portrait of John Paul I on the front (1978)

There are several conspiracy theories related to his death.

=== 2018 revelations ===
The journalist and vice-postulator for John Paul I's cause of beatification, Stefania Falasca, published a new book in 2017 titled Pope Luciani, Chronicle of a Death, in which she revealed that John Paul I had complained of chest pains hours before his death and the evening before, but discounted them and ordered that his doctor not be called. Falasca confirmed, after interviewing the sisters who found him and documents from the Vatican Apostolic Archive, that John Paul I died of a heart attack in the late evening hours of 28 September 1978.

The Cardinal Secretary of State Pietro Parolin, in his preface for the book, describes the various conspiracies regarding John Paul I's death as little more than "noir reconstructions", and that the sudden death of the pope inspired "myriad theories, suspicions, [and] suppositions" based on opinion rather than fact.

Falasca noted the 2009 testimony of Sister Margherita Marin, one of the two sisters who found the pope dead in his bedroom on the morning of 29 September 1978. John Paul I had made it a practice to have a morning coffee in the sacristy and then go into the chapel to pray before tending to the day's matters. Sister Vincenza Taffarel had noted the pope had not touched the coffee she had left for him in the sacristy at 5:15 am (after about 10 minutes) and went looking for him but found him dead, and hastily summoned Marin, who also went into the room.

Sister Vincenza said: "He hasn't come out yet? Why not?" and knocked a few more times but heard silence, then opened the door and walked in. Marin remained in the hallway but heard the elder sister say: "Your Holiness, you shouldn't pull these jokes on me" because Sister Vincenza also had heart problems. Marin testified that John Paul I's hands were cold and she was struck by the darkness of his nails. Marin further testified that original information provided by the Vatican regarding who discovered the pope was wrong, since it had originally been claimed the discovery was by the pope's secretaries Lorenzi and Magee. Marin testified that "he was in bed with a slight smile" on his face. The reading light over the headboard was still on, with his two pillows under his back propping him up, with his legs outstretched and his arms on top of the bedsheets. John Paul I was still in his pyjamas with a few typewritten sheets in his hands. His head was slightly turned to the right and his eyes were partially closed; his glasses rested on his nose.

John Paul I had suffered a severe pain in his chest for about five minutes around 7:30 pm while reciting the vespers in the chapel with Magee before dinner, but insisted against calling for Doctor Renato Buzzonetti. The latter, the book claimed, was informed of that episode after the pope's death. The book also revealed that, before the conclave that elected John Paul II, the cardinals had sent a series of written questions to the doctors who had embalmed John Paul I either on 10 or 11 October to check if there had been any signs of traumatic injuries, so as to ascertain if he died naturally rather than suspiciously. Doctor Buzzonetti sent a detailed report to the Cardinal Secretary of State Agostino Casaroli on 9 October 1979 detailing that the episode of pain John Paul I suffered was in the upper part of the sternal region.

Sister Margherita noted in late 2017 in comments made in Belluno that the pope had made a half-hour phone call on the evening of his death to Giovanni Colombo and said he wanted the Rector Major of the Salesians Egidio Viganò to agree to serve as John Paul I's successor as Patriarch of Venice.

== Canonisation process ==
=== Diocesan process ===
The process for the canonisation for John Paul I formally began in 1990 with the petition by 226 Brazilian bishops, including four cardinals. The petition was addressed directly to Pope John Paul II.

On 26 August 2002, Bishop Vincenzo Savio announced the start of the preliminary phase to collect documents and testimonies necessary to start the process of canonisation. On 8 June 2003 the Congregation for the Causes of Saints gave its assent to the work and on 17 June transferred the forum for the beatification process from Rome to Belluno-Feltre while also declaring the late pope as a Servant of God after declaring "nihil obstat" (no objections to the cause). On 23 November, on the Feast of Christ the King, the diocesan process formally opened in Belluno Cathedral with José Saraiva Martins in charge and presiding over the inauguration. The diocesan inquiry for the cause subsequently concluded on 11 November 2006 in Belluno with all the evidence collected being sent to the C.C.S. which received their validation on 13 June 2008. On 13 June 2008, the Vatican began the "Roman" phase of the beatification process for John Paul I, in which they would assess the documents and witness testimonies collected during the diocesan inquiry.

=== Roman phase ===
The documents in regard to the cause were supposed to be delivered to the prefect of the Congregation for the Causes of Saints, Angelo Amato on 17 October 2012 (the one-hundredth anniversary of the late pope's birth), in a large Positio dossier (consisting of a biography and investigation into his virtues) to examine the pros and cons of the cause. This was delayed when the cause's supporters wanted another check over all the documents. In a mass at Belluno on 20 July 2014, Tarcisio Bertone announced that the cause of beatification was set to advance. The cardinal highlighted that the Positio would be delivered in September 2014. But the dossier was not submitted to the C.C.S. until 17 October 2016; there were five volumes with around 3600 pages in total.

On 27 August 2015, Bishop Giuseppe Andrich announced that John Paul I would be beatified "soon". In a homily delivered during Mass in Canale d'Agordo, Luciani's home town, on the 37th anniversary of his election as Pope, Andrich said Church authorities had concluded the investigation into Luciani's heroic virtues. Following the conclusion of the writing of the "Positio" dossier (3652 pages in total), they received several messages affirming personal experience of Luciani's holiness, including a handwritten card from Pope Emeritus Benedict XVI. The testimony of a Pope or former Pope in considering a candidate for beatification is extremely unusual. Benedict XVI apparently recommended waiving the requirement for miracles in Luciani's case.

To determine whether or not the late pontiff should be declared Venerable, theologians and the members of the Congregation for the Causes of Saints must determine if the late pope lived a life of heroic virtue. This meeting took place on 1 June 2017 in which theologians unanimously approved the fact that the late pope exercised virtues to a heroic degree. The cardinal and bishop members discussed the cause on 7 November 2017 and issued their unanimous approval. Pope Francis named John Paul I as Venerable on 8 November 2017 after confirming his heroic virtue per the cardinal and theological virtues.

=== Beatification ===
For Luciani to be beatified, the investigators had to certify at least one miracle attributed to his intercession. For canonisation there must be a second miracle, though the reigning pope may waive these requirements altogether, as is often done in the case of beatified popes.

It was reported in 2016 that a potential miracle attributed to the late pontiff's intercession happened to a nun in Buenos Aires in Argentina. The vice-postulator for the cause, Stefania Falasca, reported in a piece for Avvenire that medical consultants in Rome deemed the healing of the Argentine nun as a miracle on 31 October 2019 as there was no possible scientific or medical explanation. Theologians likewise provided their approval on 6 May 2021 after determining that the healing came as a direct result of the late pope's intercession. Falasca reported that the cardinal and bishop members of the Congregation for the Causes of Saints were scheduled to meet to discuss the cause in October, thereby implying that a 2022 beatification was likely.

Pope Francis authorized a decree that recognized the miracle on 13 October 2021; it enabled John Paul I to be beatified at Saint Peter's Square on 4 September 2022.

==== Miracle ====
Following the announcement that John Paul I would be beatified, details were released that the miracle in question was the recovery of an 11-year-old in Buenos Aires from inflammatory encephalopathy.

=== Failed miracle ===
The postulation also drew upon the testimony of Giuseppe Denora di Altamura who claimed to have been cured of cancer by the intercession of the late pontiff. An official investigation into the alleged miracle commenced on 14 May 2007 and concluded on 30 May 2009 with the C.C.S. validating the process on 25 March 2010.

The supposed miracle attributed to his intercession was taken to a medical board in Rome on 24 April 2015 and the commission came to the conclusion that it was not a miracle that could be attributed to John Paul I. This means that another miracle will need to be found before the cause can continue.

=== Postulation ===
The postulator for the cause was Bishop Enrico dal Covolo from 2003 until 2016 when Beniamino Stella was appointed to that position. Stefania Falasca is the current vice-postulator.

== Legacy ==
Pope John Paul I was the first pope to abandon the coronation, and he was also the first pope to choose a double name (John Paul) for his papal name. His successor, Karol Józef Wojtyła, chose the same name. He was the first pope to have a Papal inauguration and the last pope to use the sedia gestatoria.

=== Views of successors ===
==== John Paul II ====
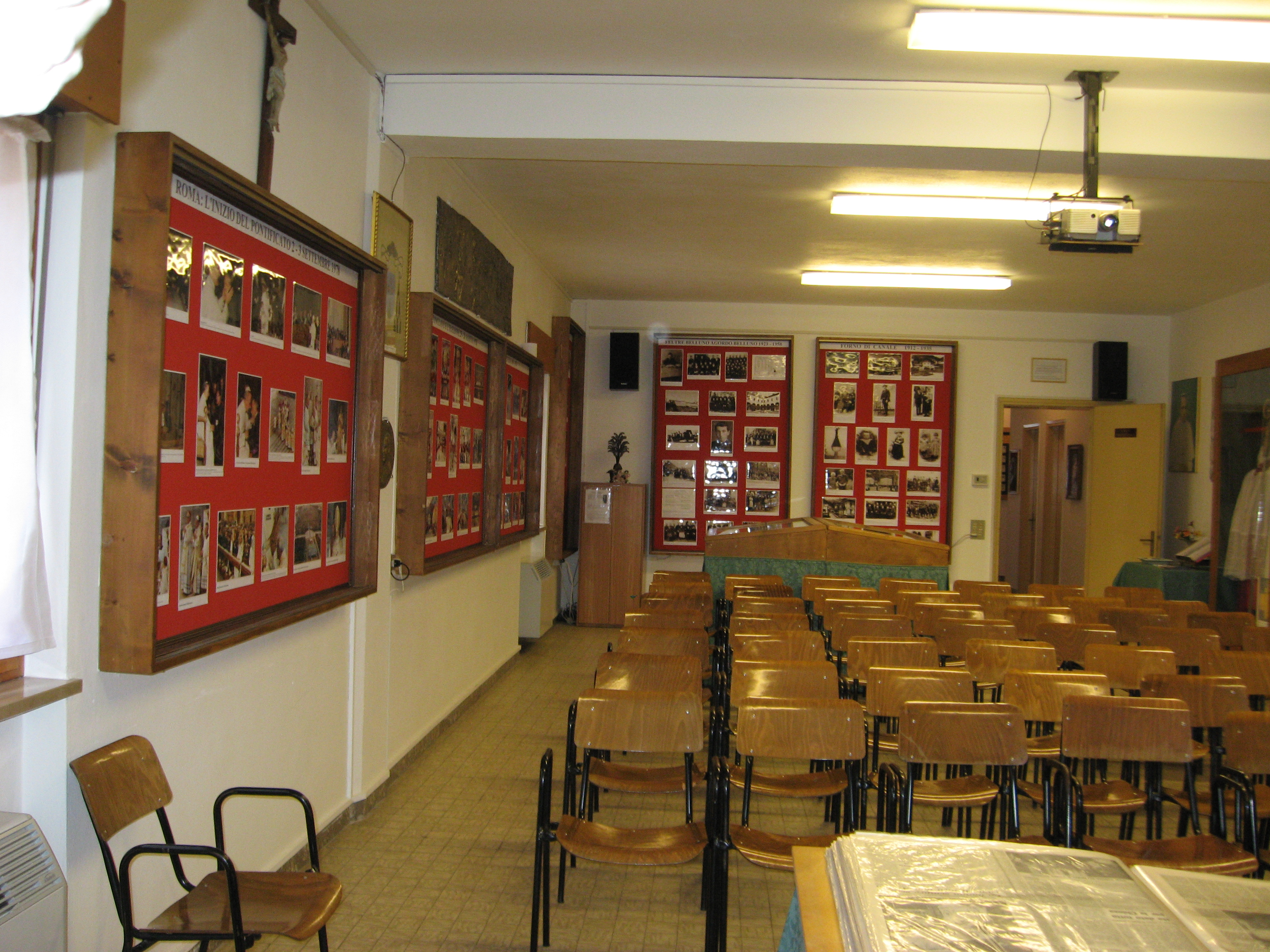
The Pope Luciani museum

Karol Wojtyła was elected John Paul I's successor as Pope on Monday, 16 October 1978. The next day he celebrated Mass together with the College of Cardinals in the Sistine Chapel. After the Mass, he delivered his first Urbi et Orbi (a traditional blessing) message, broadcast worldwide via radio. In it he pledged fidelity to the Second Vatican Council and paid tribute to his predecessor:

What can we say of John Paul I? It seems to us that only yesterday he emerged from this assembly of ours to put on the papal robes – not a light weight. But what warmth of charity, nay, what "an abundant outpouring of love" — which came forth from him in the few days of his ministry and which in his last Sunday address before the Angelus he desired should come upon the world. This is also confirmed by his wise instructions to the faithful who were present at his public audiences on faith, hope and love.

==== Benedict XVI ====
Benedict XVI spoke of the late pontiff on 28 September 2008 (the 30th anniversary of John Paul I's death) during his weekly Angelus address. Of the late pope, he said:

Because of this virtue of his, it only took 33 days for Pope Luciani to win people's hearts. In his addresses he always referred to events in practical life, from his family memories and from popular wisdom. His simplicity was a vehicle for a solid, rich teaching which, thanks to the gift of an exceptional memory and a vast knowledge, he embellished with numerous citations from ecclesiastical and secular writers. Thus, he was an incomparable catechist, following in the footsteps of St Pius X, who came from the same region and was his predecessor first on the throne of St Mark and then on that of St Peter. 'We must feel small before God,' he said during the same Audience. And he added, 'I am not ashamed to feel like a child before his mother; one believes in one's mother; I believe in the Lord, in what he has revealed to me.' These words reveal the full depth of his faith. As we thank God for having given him to the church and to the world, let us treasure his example, striving to cultivate his same humility which enabled him to talk to everyone, especially the small and the 'distant.' For this, let us invoke Mary Most Holy, the humble handmaid of the Lord.

==== Francis ====
Pope Francis spoke of his predecessor in his 2016 book The Name of God Is Mercy in which Francis recalls how touched he was by his predecessor's writings. In this book, Francis refers to Luciani more than he does any other previous pope. He refers to Luciani's remarks at the latter's general audience of 6 September 1978 and mentions how profound his words were upon him. Of the remarks Luciani made, he said:

There is the homily when Albino Luciani said he had been chosen because the Lord preferred that certain things not be engraved in bronze or marble but in the dust, so that if the writing had remained, it would have been clear that the merit was only God's.

==== Leo XIV ====
Speaking to seminarians from the Dioceses of Triveneto, Pope Leo XIV referred to Blessed John Paul I, who hailed from that region, as a "shepherd" and as a "true model for priestly life", highlighting how the "finest virtues of your people shone" in him.

== Media ==
- In 2006, the Italian Public Broadcasting Service, RAI, produced a television miniseries about the life of John Paul I, called Papa Luciani: Il sorriso di Dio (literally, "Pope Luciani: The Smile of God"). It stars Italian comedian Neri Marcorè in the titular role.
- A conspiracy theory about the Pope's death is portrayed in the 1990 crime film The Godfather Part III, where he is killed with poisoned tea in relation to the Vatican Bank. The events in the film take place in 1979 and 1980, after the real John Paul I's death. Additionally, the fictional Pope's surname is Lamberto.
- Mark E. Smith wrote a play, Hey! Luciani: The Life and Codex of John Paul I, and the song "Hey! Luciani" about the life and death of John Paul I.

== See also ==
- Moral theology of John Paul I
- List of popes
- List of shortest-reigning popes

== Notes ==
Catholic Church titles
Preceded by Giuseppe Carraro	Bishop of Vittorio-Veneto; 27 December 1958 – 15 December 1969	Succeeded by Antonio Cunial
Preceded by Giovanni Urbani	Patriarch of Venice; 15 December 1969 – 16 August 1978	Succeeded by Marco Cé
Preceded by Giovanni Urbani	Cardinal-Priest of San Marco; 5 March 1973 – 26 August 1978	Succeeded by Marco Cé
Preceded by Paul VI	Pope; 26 August – 28 September 1978	Succeeded by John Paul II
