= Three Secrets of Fátima =

Prophecies made during an apparition of the Virgin Mary in 1917

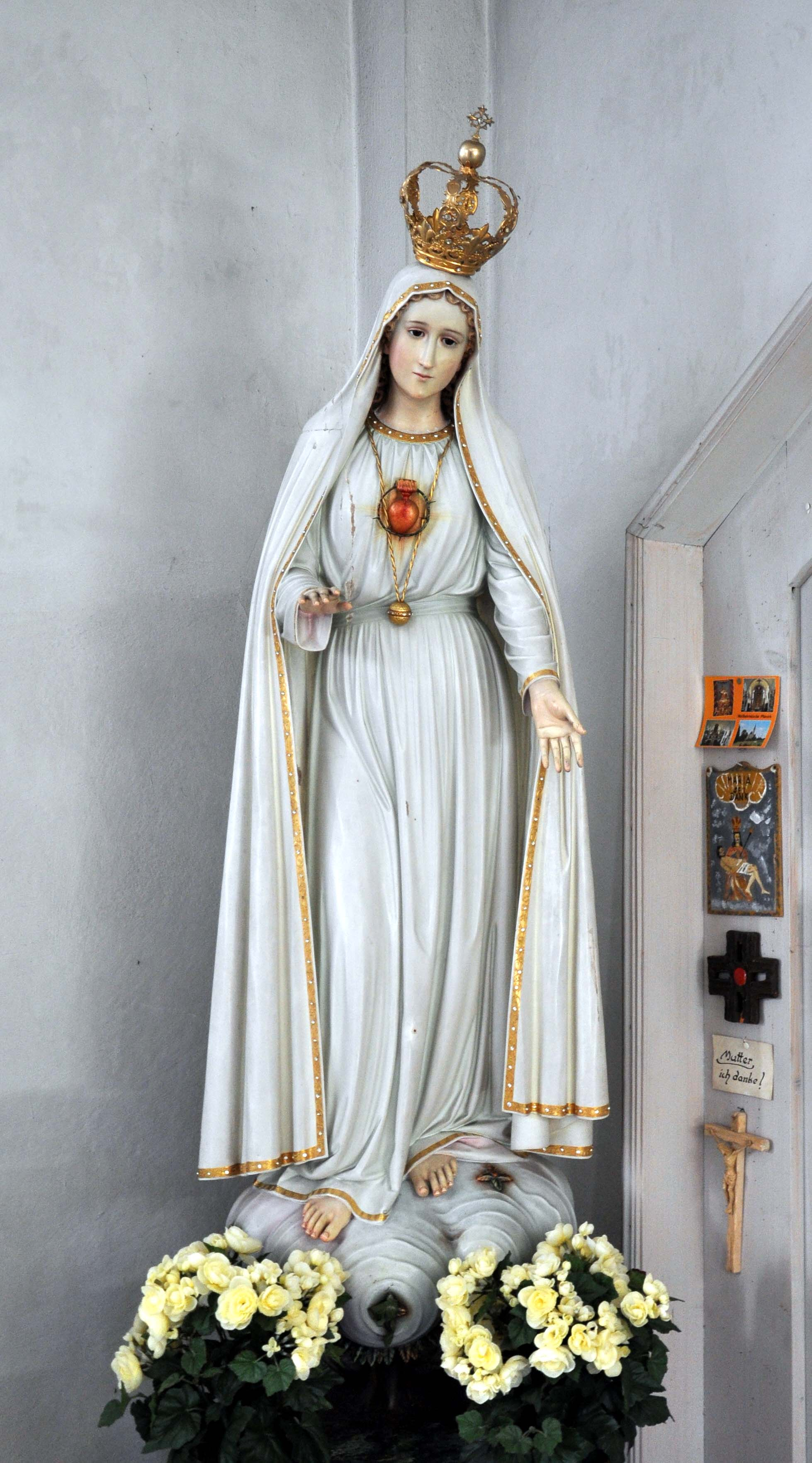
A religious statue depicting the Immaculate Heart of Mary as described by Sister Lúcia of Fátima.

The Three Secrets of Fátima (Portuguese: Os Três Segredos de Fátima) are a series of apocalyptic visions and prophecies given to three young Portuguese shepherds, Lúcia Santos and her cousins Jacinta and Francisco Marto, by a Marian apparition, starting on 13 May 1917. The three children claimed to have been visited by the Virgin Mary six times between May and October 1917. The apparition is now popularly known as Our Lady of Fátima.

According to Lúcia, around noon on 13 July 1917, the Virgin Mary entrusted the children with three secrets. Two of the secrets were revealed in 1941 in a document written by Lúcia, at the request of José Alves Correia da Silva, Bishop of Leiria, to assist with the publication of a new edition of a book on Jacinta. When asked by the Bishop in 1943 to reveal the third secret, Lúcia struggled for a short period, being "not yet convinced that God had clearly authorized her to act". However, in October 1943 the Bishop ordered her to put it in writing. Lúcia then wrote the secret down and sealed it in an envelope not to be opened until 1960, when "it will appear clearer". The text of the third secret was officially released by Pope John Paul II in 2000. Some claim that it was not the entire secret revealed by Lúcia, despite repeated assertions from the Vatican to the contrary.

According to various Catholic interpretations, the three secrets involve Hell, World War I and World War II, and 20th-century persecutions of Christians.

== Background ==
Of the hundreds of alleged Marian apparitions the Catholic Church has investigated, only twelve have received ecclesiastical approval, with nine having occurred between 1830 and 1933. Cultural anthropologists Victor and Edith Turner, who converted to Catholicism in 1958, at one time viewed the increase in Marian apparition cults as a post-industrial reaction of a "disenfranchised lower middle class to a rapidly changing culture."

On 17 June 1921, at the age of 14, Lúcia was admitted as a boarder at the Sisters of Saint Dorothy school in Vilar, near Porto. In 1925, at the age of 18, she began her novitiate at the convent of the Sisters of Saint Dorothy in Tui, just across the border in Spain. Lúcia continued to report private visions periodically throughout her life. In the mid-1930s the Bishop of Leiria encouraged Lúcia (religious name: Sister Maria Lúcia das Dores) to write her memoirs, so as to disclose further details of her cousins and the 1917 apparitions.

As early as July 1917, mention was made that the Lady of the apparitions had entrusted to the children a secret, "that was good for some and bad for others". It was not until her third memoir, written in 1941, that Lúcia began to write more in depth about the content of the secret. In this, she follows the French visionary Mélanie Calvat who saw Our Lady of La Salette in 1846, who wrote down the secrets from that event almost twenty years after. Lúcia wrote that the secret has three parts, the first two of which she revealed in 1941. The third, however, was not written down until 3 January 1944.

== First secret ==
In her third memoir (1941), Lúcia said that the first secret, a vision of Hell, was disclosed to the children on 13 July 1917.

Our Lady showed us a great sea of fire which seemed to be under the earth. Plunged in this fire were demons and souls in human form, like transparent burning embers, all blackened or burnished bronze, floating about in the conflagration, now raised into the air by the flames that issued from within themselves together with great clouds of smoke, now falling back on every side like sparks in a huge fire, without weight or equilibrium, and amid shrieks and groans of pain and despair, which horrified us and made us tremble with fear. The demons could be distinguished by their terrifying and repulsive likeness to frightful and unknown animals, all black and transparent. This vision lasted but an instant. How can we ever be grateful enough to our kind heavenly Mother, who had already prepared us by promising, in the first Apparition, to take us to heaven. Otherwise, I think we would have died of fear and terror.

== Second secret ==
The second secret refers to the devotion to the Immaculate Heart of Mary and was initially only partially revealed to the children on 13 July 1917. Various prophecies related to this devotion were made, such as a statement that World War I would end, along with a prediction of another war during the reign of Pope Pius XI, should men continue offending God and should Russia not convert. The second half is a future request of the consecration of Russia to the Immaculate Heart of Mary and the First Saturdays Devotion:

You have seen hell where the souls of poor sinners go. To save them, God wishes to establish in the world devotion to my Immaculate Heart. If what I say to you is done, many souls will be saved and there will be peace. The war is going to end: but if people do not cease offending God, a worse one will break out during the Pontificate of Pope Pius XI. When you see a night illumined by an unknown light, know that this is the great sign given you by God that he is about to punish the world for its crimes, by means of war, famine, and persecutions of the Church and of the Holy Father. To prevent this, I shall come to ask for the Consecration of Russia to my Immaculate Heart, and the Communion of reparation on the First Saturdays. If my requests are heeded, Russia will be converted, and there will be peace; if not, she will spread her errors throughout the world, causing wars and persecutions of the Church. The good will be martyred; the Holy Father will have much to suffer; various nations will be annihilated. In the end, my Immaculate Heart will triumph. The Holy Father will consecrate Russia to me, and she shall be converted, and a period of peace will be granted to the world.

On 10 December 1925, Sister Lúcia reported an apparition of the Virgin Mary, accompanied by the Child Jesus on a luminous cloud, while residing at the Convent of Saint Dorothea at Pontevedra, Spain. The Virgin Mary defined the conditions for the First Saturdays devotion and asked her to propagate the devotion. Later, on 15 February 1926, she reported a subsequent vision of the Christ Child reiterating this request. On 13 June 1929, she reported a vision of both Mary and the Holy Trinity, in which Mary had asked for the Consecration of Russia to her Immaculate Heart by the Pope, in communion with all the bishops of the world. This later vision fulfilled what was said in 1917 about how the Virgin Mary would come later to request the consecration. The message regarding the establishment of the Five First Saturdays Devotion is reminiscent of that reported by Margaret Mary Alacoque in the seventeenth century, which led to the First Fridays Devotion.

It is unlikely that this message was conveyed to the Pope, but the Bishop of Leiria suggested that she write her memoirs so as to provide more details on her cousins as well as further details of the 1917 apparitions. In her third memoir, written in 1941, Sister Lúcia recalled that at the apparition of 13 July 1917, the Virgin Mary had first mentioned the consecration of Russia, and said that she would return to give particulars.

The second prophecy was not disclosed until August 1941, after World War II had already begun. Skeptics have questioned whether Mary, in 1917, referred explicitly to Pope Pius XI, as Ambrogio Ratti did not choose that regnal name until after his election in 1922. Further, the European portion of World War II is generally held to have begun on 1 September 1939, and by then, Pope Pius XII had succeeded Pius XI. As for the conversion of Russia, the Bolshevik Revolution did not happen until November 1917.

Some proponents of the Fátima prophecies argue that the secret did not say that the war must begin in Europe, and during the pontificate of Pius XI Japan had already invaded China in 1937, which is generally seen by historians of China and other parts of Asia as when the Second World War actually began, a view which also has qualified support from some Western historians. Some critics argue that the Russian Civil War (1918–1921), the Irish War of Independence (1919–1921), the Chinese Civil War (1927–1937), the war between Italy and Ethiopia (1935–1936), and the Spanish Civil War (1936–1939) serve to illustrate that the prediction that one war will end and that another will start is not necessarily an indication of divine inspiration. Proponents of the prophecy will point out that the second secret called for a war worse than World War I, not simply any armed conflict. In addition, with regards to the conversion of Russia, there was already, at the time, strong revolutionary ferment in Russia before the Bolshevik Revolution as witnessed by the earlier February Revolution in 1917 and the active Communist and anarchist movements, which would explain Mary's reference on 13 July 1917 to the need for a conversion of Russia.

On 25 January 1938, The New York Times reported "Aurora Borealis Startles Europe; People Flee in Fear, Call Firemen." The celestial display was seen from Canada to Bermuda to Austria to Scotland, and short-wave radio transmissions were shut down for almost 12 hours in Canada. It is noteworthy that during the final hour of this aurora, Christian Rakovsky was undergoing interrogation in the Soviet Union, giving information to Stalin about Western involvement in Hitler's rise, suggesting an alliance with the Western powers against Germany. Just over a month later, Hitler seized Austria and eight months later invaded Czechoslovakia.

On June 16, 1978, after decades of the Fatima prophecies being largely absent from mainstream discourse and press coverage, Kellie Everts gave a speech in front of the White House in Washington, D.C. about the aforementioned prophecy, and thus strongly urging the consecration of Russia in the hopes of preventing a nuclear World War III. The speech had received coverage in The Washington Post, The Washington Star, and elsewhere.

On March 25, 1984, Pope John Paul II was believed by many to have finally consecrated Russia in fulfillment of the Fatima prophecy, though he did not specifically mention Russia or the Soviet Union by name. He did, however, refer to "all individuals and peoples", which would implicitly include Russia.

As a result of the 2022 Russian invasion of Ukraine, Pope Francis announced he would consecrate Russia and Ukraine (both by name) to the Immaculate Heart of Mary which he did on March 25, 2022.

== Third secret ==
Sister Lúcia chose not to disclose the third secret in her memoir of August 1941. In 1943, Lúcia fell seriously ill with influenza and pleurisy. Bishop Silva, visiting her on 15 September 1943, suggested that she write the third secret down to ensure that it would be recorded in the event of her death. However, Lúcia was hesitant to do so as, upon receiving the secret, she had heard Mary say not to reveal it. Because Carmelite obedience requires that orders from superiors be regarded as coming directly from God, she was in a quandary as to whose orders took precedence. Finally, in mid-October, Bishop Silva sent her a letter containing a direct order to record the secret. Lúcia continued to struggle, even after this direct order. According to Lúcia, she overcame it after the Virgin Mary appeared to her in early January 1944 and said, "Write that which they command you, but not that which is given to you to understand of its meaning."

The third part of the secret was written down "by order of His Excellency the Bishop of Leiria and the Most Holy Mother" on 3 January 1944. In June 1944, the sealed envelope containing the third secret was delivered to Silva, where it stayed until 1957, when it was finally delivered to Rome. Canon Galamba, an advisor to the Bishop of Leiria, is quoted as saying that when the bishop refused to open the sealed envelope, Lúcia "made him promise that it would definitely be opened and released to the world at her death, or in 1960, whichever came first." The bishop died in 1957.

It was announced by Cardinal Angelo Sodano on 13 May 2000, 83 years after the first apparition of the Lady to the children in the Cova da Iria, and 19 years after the assassination attempt on Pope John Paul II that the third secret would finally be released. In his announcement, Cardinal Sodano implied that the secret was about the 20th-century persecution of Christians that culminated in the failed Pope John Paul II assassination attempt on 13 May 1981, the 64th anniversary of the first apparition of the Lady at Fátima. The idea of an already fulfilled secret is contested by some Catholics.

The text of the third secret, according to the Vatican, was published on 26 June 2000:

J.M.J.

The third part of the secret revealed at the Cova da Iria-Fátima, on 13 July 1917.

I write in obedience to you, my God, who command me to do so through his Excellency the Bishop of Leiria and through your Most Holy Mother and mine.

After the two parts which I have already explained, at the left of Our Lady and a little above, we saw an Angel with a flaming sword in his left hand; flashing, it gave out flames that looked as though they would set the world on fire; but they died out in contact with the splendour that Our Lady radiated towards him from her right hand: pointing to the earth with his right hand, the Angel cried out in a loud voice: 'Penance, Penance, Penance!'. And we saw in an immense light that is God, something similar to how people appear in a mirror when they pass in front of it, a Bishop dressed in White. We had the impression that it was the Holy Father. Other Bishops, Priests, men and women Religious going up a steep mountain, at the top of which there was a big Cross of rough-hewn trunks as of a cork-tree with the bark; before reaching there the Holy Father passed through a big city half in ruins and half trembling with halting step, afflicted with pain and sorrow, he prayed for the souls of the corpses he met on his way; having reached the top of the mountain, on his knees at the foot of the big Cross he was killed by a group of soldiers who fired bullets and arrows at him, and in the same way there died one after another the other Bishops, Priests, men and women Religious, and various lay people of different ranks and positions. Beneath the two arms of the Cross there were two Angels each with a crystal aspersorium in his hand, in which they gathered up the blood of the Martyrs and with it sprinkled the souls that were making their way to God.

Tuy-3-1-1944.

Along with the text of the secret, Cardinal Joseph Ratzinger (the future Pope Benedict XVI) published a theological commentary in which he states: "A careful reading of the text of the so-called third 'secret' of Fatima [...] will probably prove disappointing or surprising after all the speculation it has stirred. No great mystery is revealed; nor is the future unveiled." After explaining the differences between public and private revelations, he cautions people not to see in the message a determined future event:

The purpose of the vision is not to show a film of an irrevocably fixed future. Its meaning is exactly the opposite: it is meant to mobilize the forces of change in the right direction. Therefore we must totally discount fatalistic explanations of the "secret", such as, for example, the claim that the would-be assassin of 13 May 1981 was merely an instrument of the divine plan guided by Providence and could not therefore have acted freely, or other similar ideas in circulation. Rather, the vision speaks of dangers and how we might be saved from them.

He then moves on to talk about the symbolic nature of the images, noting: "The concluding part of the 'secret' uses images which Lucia may have seen in devotional books and which draw their inspiration from long-standing intuitions of faith." As for the meaning of the message: "What remains was already evident when we began our reflections on the text of the 'secret': the exhortation to prayer as the path of 'salvation for souls' and, likewise, the summons to penance and conversion."

On 13 May 2010, during a homily in Fatima, Pope Benedict said that "we would be mistaken to think that Fatima's prophetic mission is complete." He then expressed the hope that the centenary of the 1917 apparitions may "hasten the fulfillment of the prophecy of the triumph of the Immaculate Heart of Mary, for the glory of the Blessed Trinity."

== Third secret controversy ==
Prior to the 1930s, the main focus of devotion to Our Lady of Fatima (which was at that time not widely known outside Portugal and Spain) was on the need to pray the Rosary for an end to World War I and for world peace. After the publication of Sister Lúcia's memoirs, starting in 1935, Fatima came to be seen as presenting the victory of the Blessed Virgin over Communism.

On 8 February 1960, the Portuguese news information agency Agência Nacional de Informação published a news article stating that it was "most probable the Secret would remain, for ever, under absolute seal." This announcement produced considerable speculation over the content of the secret. According to The New York Times, speculation ranged from "worldwide nuclear annihilation to deep rifts in the Roman Catholic Church that lead to rival papacies." On 2 May 1981, Laurence James Downey hijacked an airplane and demanded that Pope John Paul II make public the third secret of Fátima.

The release of the text sparked criticism from the Catholic Church in Portugal. Clergy as well as laypeople were offended that the text had been read in Rome and not at the Fátima shrine in Portugal where the reported events took place. The Times for 29 June 2000 reported that "The revelation on Monday that there were no doomsday predictions has provoked angry reactions from the Portuguese church over the decision to keep the prophecy secret for half a century".

Critics such as Italian journalist and media personality Antonio Socci claim that the four-page handwritten text of the Third Secret released by the Vatican in 2000 is not the real secret, or at least not the full secret. The argument is based on the following:

- Written on one sheet of paper: the text of the third secret released by the Vatican is handwritten on four sheets of paper. Father Joaquin Alonso, official Fátima archivist for 16 years, reports in his book that, "Lucy tells us that she wrote it on a sheet of paper." In a taped interview, Charles Fiore quoted Malachi Martin as saying the following regarding the text of the third secret: "I cooled my heels in the corridor outside the Holy Father's apartments, while my boss, Cardinal Bea, was inside debating with the Holy Father, and with a group of other bishops and priests, and two young Portuguese seminarians, who translated the letter, a single page, written in Portuguese, for all those in the room." Later, in May, 2007, Tarcisio Cardinal Bertone went on the Italian television program Porta a Porta and showed Lúcia's document on camera. It was a single sheet of paper that had been divided twice, once vertically, and then once horizontally. Lucia's handwriting was on both sides of the sheet of paper. The vertical squares were what the Vatican reproduced in June 2000.
- Written in the form of a letter: another reason why critics argue the full third secret has not been released is because of indications that the third secret was written in the form of a signed letter to the Bishop of Leiria and the text of the third secret released by the Vatican is not written in the form of a letter. Lúcia was interviewed by Father Jongen on 3 February 1946. When Fr. Jongen asked Lúcia when the time would arrive for the Third Secret, Lúcia responded, "I communicated the third part in a letter to the Bishop of Leiria." Also, Canon Galamba, an advisor to the Bishop of Leiria, is quoted as saying, "When the bishop refused to open the letter, Lucy made him promise that it would definitely be opened and read to the world either at her death or in 1960, whichever came first." Antonio Socci, however, questioned how strictly one should interpret the word "letter."
- Contains words attributed to the Blessed Virgin Mary: the text of the third secret released by the Vatican contains no words attributed to the Blessed Virgin Mary. Socci asserts that the third secret probably begins with the words "In Portugal the dogma of the Faith will always be preserved etc.", words which Lúcia included in her fourth memoir, but which are included only as a footnote to the text released by the Vatican. Lúcia, however, stated in her fourth memoir that she was not going to reveal the third part.
- Contains information about the Apocalypse, apostasy, Satanic infiltration of the Church: in an interview published in the 11 November 1984 edition of Jesus Magazine, Cardinal Ratzinger was asked whether he had read the text of the third secret and why it had not been revealed. Ratzinger acknowledged that he had read the third secret, and stated in part that the third secret involves the "importance of the novissimi", and "dangers threatening the faith and the life of the Christian and therefore (the life) of the world." Ratzinger also commented that "If it is not made public – at least for the time being – it is in order to prevent religious prophecy from being mistaken for a quest for the sensational." Also, Howard Dee, former Philippine ambassador to the Vatican, was interviewed by Inside the Vatican in 1998. Dee claimed that Cardinal Ratzinger had personally confirmed to him that the messages of Akita and Fátima are "essentially the same". The Akita prophecy, in part, contains the following: "The work of the devil will infiltrate even into the Church in such a way that one will see cardinals opposing cardinals, bishops against bishops. … churches and altars sacked ...." On 13 May 2000, Cardinal Sodano announced that the third secret would be released, during which he implied the secret was about the persecution of Christians in the 20th century that culminated in the failed assassination attempt on Pope John Paul II on 13 May 1981. In a syndicated radio broadcast, Malachi Martin stated that the third secret "doesn't make any sense unless we accept that there will be, or that there is in progress, a wholesale apostasy amongst clerics, and laity in the Catholic Church ...".

In a 1980 interview for the German magazine Stimme des Glaubens published in October 1981, John Paul II was asked explicitly to speak about the third secret. He said:

Because of the seriousness of its contents, in order not to encourage the world wide power of Communism to carry out certain coups, my predecessors in the chair of Peter have diplomatically preferred to withhold its publication. On the other hand, it should be sufficient for all Christians to know this much: if there is a message in which it is said that the oceans will flood entire sections of the earth; that, from one moment to the other, millions of people will perish... there is no longer any point in really wanting to publish this secret message. Many want to know merely out of curiosity, or because of their taste for sensationalism, but they forget that 'to know' implies for them a responsibility. It is dangerous to want to satisfy one's curiosity only, if one is convinced that we can do nothing against a catastrophe that has been predicted." He held up his rosary and stated "Here is the remedy against this evil. Pray, pray and ask for nothing else. Put everything in the hands of the Mother of God." Asked what would happen in the Church, he said: "We must be prepared to undergo great trials in the not-too-distant future; trials that will require us to be ready to give up even our lives, and a total gift of self to Christ and for Christ. Through your prayers and mine, it is possible to alleviate this tribulation, but it is no longer possible to avert it, because it is only in this way that the Church can be effectively renewed. How many times, indeed, has the renewal of the Church been effected in blood? This time, again, it will not be otherwise. We must be strong [...] we must entrust ourselves to Christ and to His holy Mother, and we must be attentive, very attentive, to the prayer of the Rosary."

However, during the 26 June 2000 press conference that saw the publication of the third secret, Cardinal Ratzinger denied that John Paul II had made these remarks.

According to one source, Lúcia was allegedly asked about the third secret and remarked that it was "in the Gospels and in the Apocalypse", and at one point had even specified Apocalypse chapters 8 to 13, a range that includes the Book of Revelation 12:4, the chapter and verse cited by Pope John Paul II in his homily in Fátima on 13 May 2000.

== Cardinal Bertone's response ==
The Vatican has maintained its position that the full text of the third secret was published in June 2000. A report from the Zenit Daily Dispatch dated 20 December 2001 based on a Vatican press release, reported that Lúcia told then-Archbishop Tarcisio Bertone, in an interview conducted the previous month, that the secret has been completely revealed and published, and that no secrets remain. Bertone, along with Cardinal Ratzinger, co-authored The Message of Fatima, the document published in June 2000 by the Vatican that contains a scanned copy of the original text of the third secret.

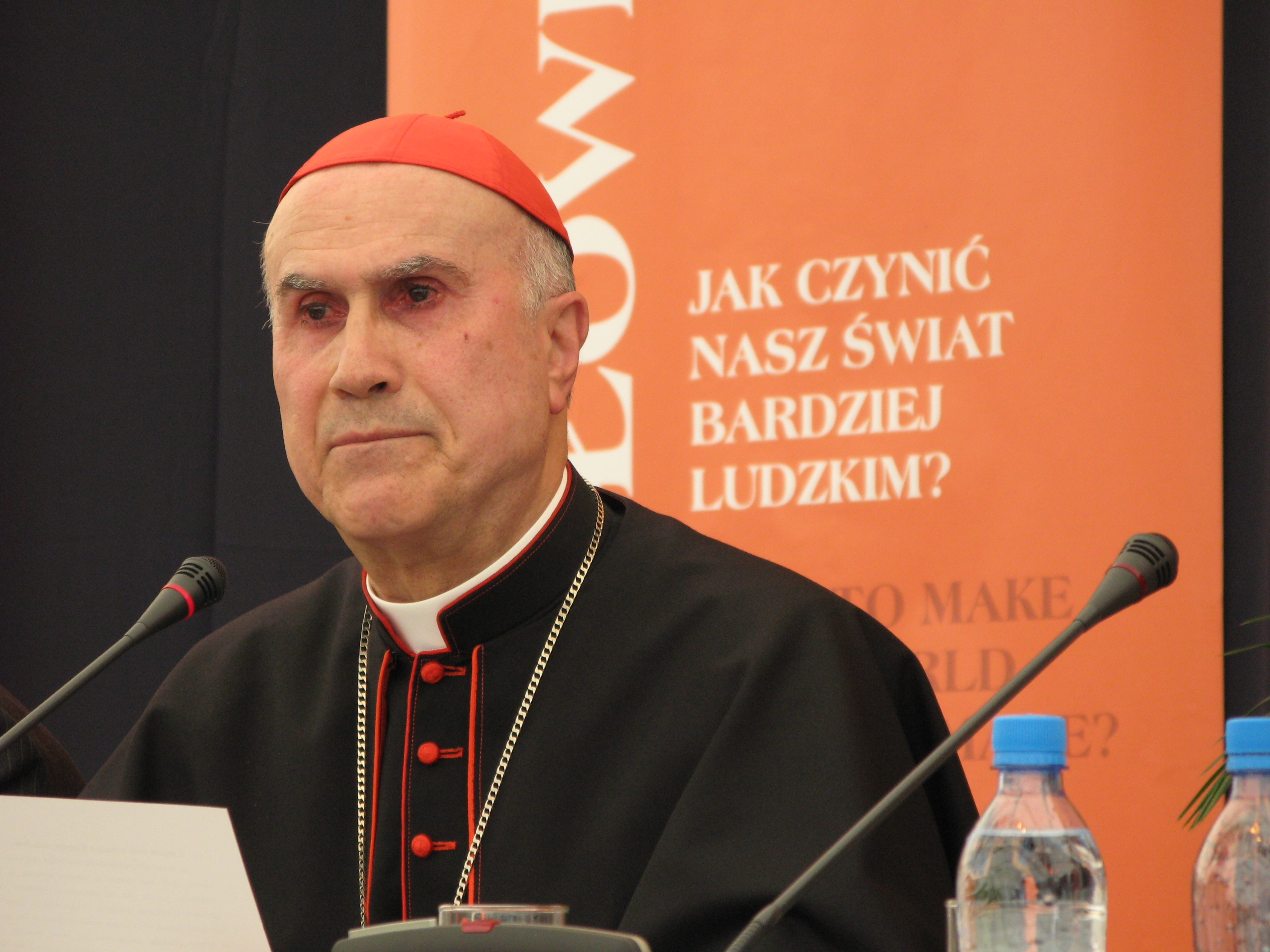
Cardinal Tarcisio Bertone

Bertone, who was elevated to the rank of cardinal in 2003 and held the position of Vatican Secretary of State until September 2013, wrote a book in 2007 titled The Last Secret of Fatima. The book contains a transcribed interview between journalist Giuseppe De Carli and Bertone in which Bertone responds to various criticisms and accusations regarding the content and disclosure of the third secret. At one point in the interview, De Carli comments on an unsourced accusation that the Vatican is concealing a one-page text of the third secret which predicts a great apostasy where Rome will "lose the faith and become the throne of the Antichrist." Bertone responds as follows:

That's absolutely crazy. Look, are you claiming that the prophecy of Fatima is about the apostasy of the Church of Rome? That Fatima is a prediction of Rome's transformation into the throne of the Antichrist? Despite the love Our Lady has for the Pope and the Popes for Our Lady? Anyone can write books based on conspiracy theories, on biased interpretations. Anybody can take sentences out of context and present them as clues to some supposed plot to avoid divulging the truth and to transmit it in a code that only the initiates can understand. No, the whole theory you allude to is a fabrication. And this supposedly factual account is actually the sort of device the Masons used to invent to discredit the Church. I'm surprised that journalists and writers who claim to be Catholic let themselves be taken in.

At another point in the interview, De Carli claimed that Cardinal Ottaviani had once stated, "the [third] Secret was written on a single sheet of paper. So we would be talking about twenty to twenty-five lines in total..." He also mentions that one of Lúcia's memoirs contains the words "In Portugal, the dogma of the faith will always be preserved etc", words which some believe introduce the real third secret. Describing these observations as "feeble bits of evidence that neither prove nor disprove anything", De Carli asks Cardinal Bertone about the possibility of there being two texts, where the "first document" contains the words of the Blessed Virgin Mary, and the other contains the description of the vision published by the Vatican. Bertone answers in part "There is no first document. There never was any such text in the archives of the Holy Office." Bertone also says "So I'm not sure what Cardinal Ottaviani was talking about." Bertone also states that "We have the word, better, the official confirmation of Sister Lúcia: 'Is this the Third Secret, and is this the only text of it?' 'Yes, this is the Third Secret, and I never wrote any other'." It was later discovered that Cardinal Ottaviani had never remarked about the number of the lines of text.

Later on in the interview, Bertone again addresses the question as to whether a text exists with words attributed to the Blessed Virgin that was censored: "The part of the text where the Virgin speaks in the first person wasn't censored, for the simple reason that it never existed. ...I'm basing my statement on Sister Lucia's own direct confirmation that the Third Secret is none other than the text that was published in the year 2000."

In early September 2007, archbishop Loris Francesco Capovilla, private secretary to Pope John XXIII, who witnessed Pope John open the envelope of the third secret, said there was no truth in the rumor that the Vatican was suppressing a vision of the end of the world. "There are not two truths from Fatima and nor is there any fourth secret. The text which I read in 1959 is the same that was distributed by the Vatican." Capovilla is also quoted as saying "I have had enough of these conspiracy theories. It just isn't true. I read it, I presented it to the Pope and we resealed the envelope."

On 21 September 2007 writers Antonio Socci and Solideo Paolini, who have competing books on Fatima, attempted to crash a reception at the Pontifical Urbanianum University where Bertone was to introduce his book The Last Fatima Visionary: My Meetings with Sister Lucia. They stated that they wished to participate in the question and answer part of the reception. When told that the cardinal would not be taking questions, they then tried to confront Bertone, who is the Vatican Secretary of State. Security guards hustled them out. In talking to reporters afterwards, Socci and Paolini produced a tape recording in which they claimed Archbishop Loris Francesco Capovilla, revealed that there were two texts of the third secret, although Capovilla had stated otherwise less than two weeks before.

Pope Paul VI and Pope John Paul I also read the contents of the third secret, in 1965 and 1978 respectively, but they too preferred to reseal the contents so that they would be disclosed later.

== Pope John Paul I ==
The Catholic Counter-Reformation group, founded by theologian Abbé George de Nantes, takes the position that the released text is the complete third secret, but refers to Pope John Paul I rather than John Paul II, pointing out that the latter, after all, did not die when he was attacked, while the bishop in the third secret did. John Paul I had met Lúcia Santos while he was Patriarch of Venice, and was deeply moved by the experience. In a letter to a colleague after his election, he vowed to perform the Consecration of Russia which Lúcia said Mary had asked for.

== Critical Commentaries ==
Michael Cuneo notes "Secret messages, apocalyptic countdowns, cloak-and-dagger intrigue within the highest echelons of the Vatican: not even Hollywood could ask for better material than this".

"To understand and appreciate Fatima is to understand and appreciate Portuguese Catholicism". Jeffrey S. Bennett takes note of how, starting in the 1930s, the image of Our Lady of Fátima developed into a rallying point for anti-communism, an idea that spread far beyond the Iberian Peninsula. Martindale mentions a concept where the fruits of a phenomenon are more important than its historical origins. Therefore, it is possible to conceive of a vibrant cultus where the strength of the devotion, shrine, or pilgrimage, can outweigh uncertainties regarding its origin. According to Maunder, Fátima demonstrates not only how seriously Catholics took "the revelations of an enclosed nun remembering visions she had experienced at the age of ten, but also show how difficult it is for the hierarchy to manage a movement of popular piety, despite critics claims of manipulation. Following Fátima, there would be proliferation of apocalyptic manifestations, such as at Necedah.

== See also ==
- The Miracle of Our Lady of Fatima, 1952 film
- Fatima, 2020 film
- Miracle of the Sun
