= Pontevedra apparitions =

Marian apparitions in Pontevedra, Spain

The Pontevedra apparitions refer to a series of reported apparitions of the Virgin Mary and the Child Jesus, experienced by Lúcia dos Santos, one of the Portuguese visionaries of Our Lady of Fátima. These apparitions allegedly took place at the Dorothean convent of Pontevedra, Spain, on December 10, 1925 and February 15, 1926.

Although no canonical inquiry has been initiated by the Catholic Church to assess the authenticity of these apparitions, the First Saturdays Devotion, associated with the apparitions, was approved by the bishop of Leiria on September 13, 1939.

== The apparitions ==
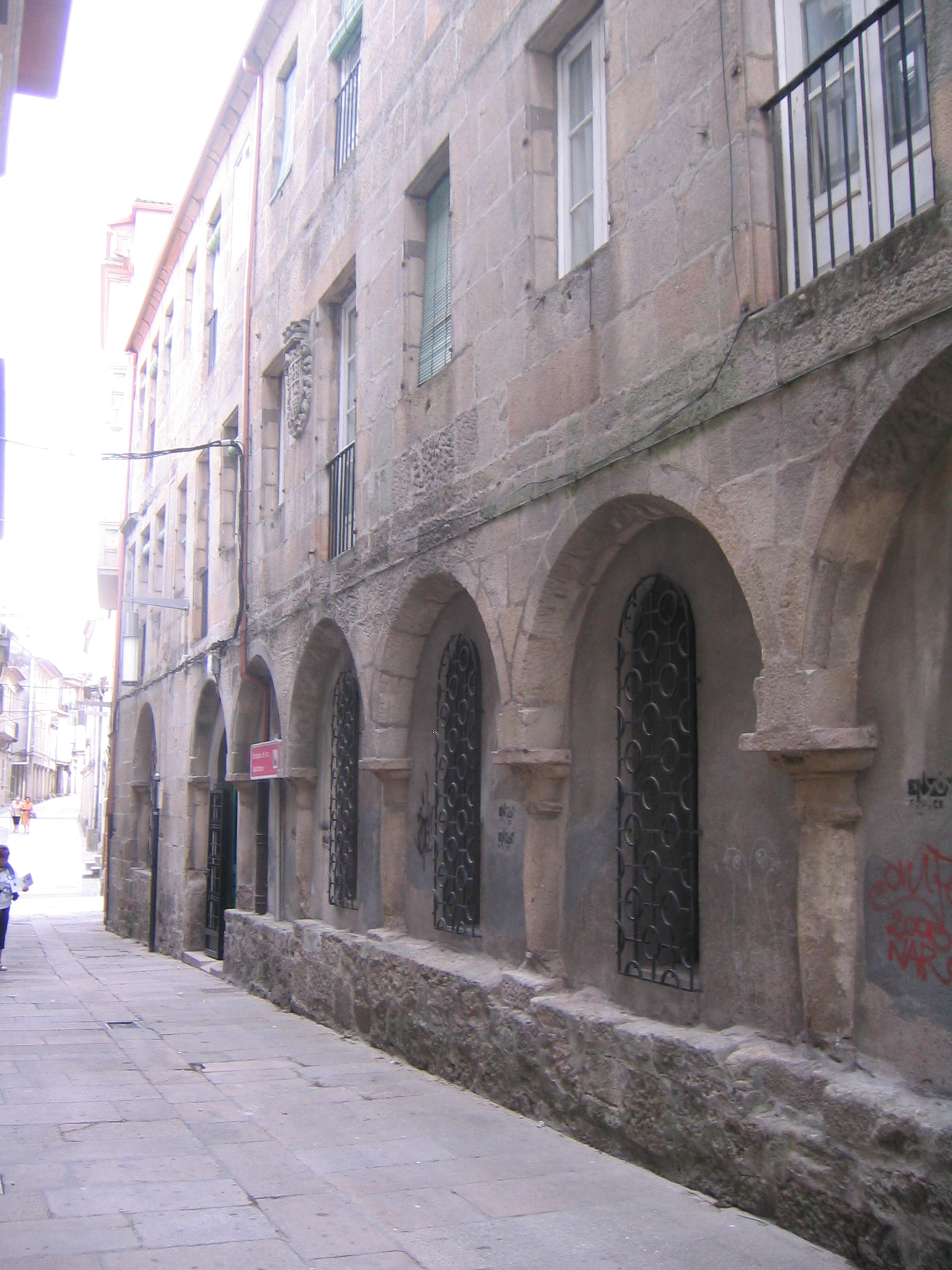
Dorothean convent in Pontevedra, now known as the Sanctuary of the Apparitions.

=== First apparition ===
On June 17, 1921, at the age of 14, Lúcia dos Santos, the last surviving visionary of the Fátima apparitions, was admitted as a boarder at the Sisters of Saint Dorothea school in Vilar, near the city of Porto. In 1925, at the age of 18, Lúcia began her novitiate with the Sisters of Saint Dorothea in the convent of Tui, Spain.

According to a document in her memoir “Fatima in Lucia’s Own Words”, Lúcia experienced a vision of the Virgin Mary, accompanied by the Child Jesus on a luminous cloud, on December 10, 1925, while residing at the convent in Pontevedra, Spain. During this vision, Mary placed her hand on Lúcia's shoulder and revealed a heart surrounded by thorns, which she was holding in her hand. The Child Jesus then spoke to Lúcia, asking her:

"Have compassion on the heart of your Most Holy Mother, covered with thorns, with which ungrateful men pierce it at every moment, and there is no one to make an act of reparation to remove them."

The Virgin Mary then spoke to her and defined the conditions for the First Saturdays devotion, which was to be done in reparation for sins against the Immaculate Heart of Mary. She also promised that those who fulfilled these conditions on the first Saturday of five consecutive months, would receive special graces at the hour of their death for their salvation:

"Look, my daughter, at my Heart, surrounded with thorns with which ungrateful men pierce me at very moment by their blasphemies and ingratitude. You at least try to console me and say that I promise to assist at the hour of death, with the graces necessary for salvation, all those who, on the first Saturday of five consecutive months, shall confess, receive Holy Communion, recite five decades of the Rosary, and keep me company for 15 minutes while meditating on the 15 mysteries of the Rosary, with the intention of making reparation to me."

Following this apparition, Lúcia took steps to make known Mary's new request. She informed her Mother Superior and her current confessor at the convent, and even wrote to her previous confessor. However, both were hesitant and advised her to wait before taking any further action.

The First Saturdays devotion had already been requested during the Our Lady of Fátima apparition on July 13, 1917, and is considered an integral part of the Fátima message. According to Lúcia, the Virgin Mary had told her that she would return “to ask for the consecration of Russia to my Immaculate Heart and the Communion of reparation on the first Saturdays”, which she allegedly did eight years later in Pontevedra.

Before these apparitions, a Marian devotion on the first Saturdays of the month was already established within the Catholic Church. On July 1, 1905, Pope Pius X approved and granted indulgences for the practice of the first Saturdays of twelve consecutive months in honor of the Immaculate Conception. This apparition at Pontevedra, requesting the establishment of the devotion of the Five First Saturdays, bears similarities to the requests reported by Margaret Mary Alacoque in the 17th century, which led to the establishment of the First Fridays Devotion.

=== Second apparition ===
Later, on February 15, 1926, Lúcia reported an encounter while emptying a garbage can outside the garden. She saw a child whom she thought she recognized and had spoken with once before. After engaging in conversation, the child responded to one of her questions by asking: "And have you revealed to the world what the Heavenly Mother has asked you ?". The child then transformed into the Child Jesus, who reproached Lúcia for not doing more to promote the Five First Saturdays Devotion. Jesus also expressed sorrow over the fact that "many souls begin them, but few finish them," and lamented the lack of fervor and spirit of reparation. After this conversation with Lúcia, the Infant Jesus eased the conditions of the devotion, as they are known today.

== Church approval ==
No official canonical investigation has been initiated by the Catholic Church regarding the authenticity of the apparitions, and the Church has not made a formal declaration affirming or denying their authenticity.

The First Saturdays Devotion, associated with the Pontevedra apparitions, was approved at the diocesan level by José Alves Correia da Silva, the local bishop of Leiria-Fátima, on September 13, 1939 in Fátima, without official approval at the level of the universal Church by the Holy See.
