= José Galamba de Oliveira =

Portuguese Catholic priest (1903–1984)

Monsignor Canon José Galamba de Oliveira GOIH
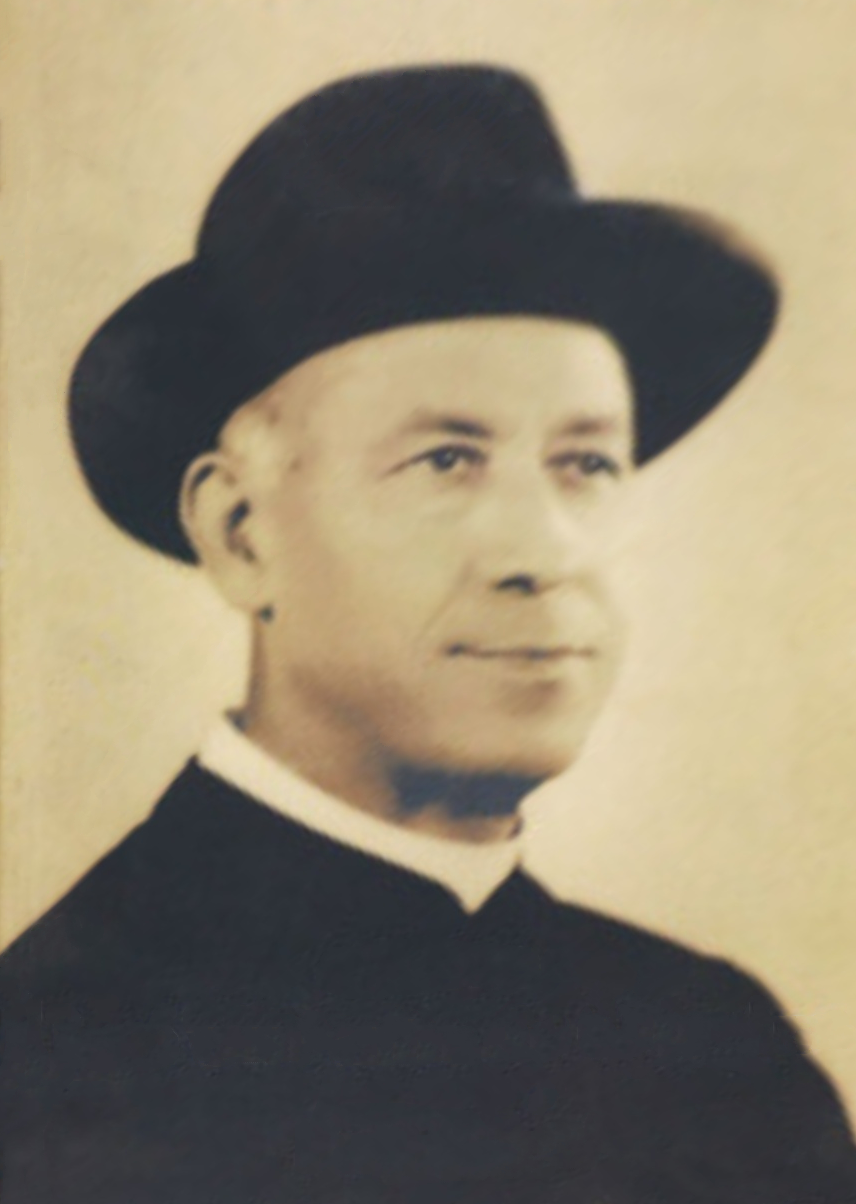
- Church: Roman Catholic
- Diocese: Leiria–Fátima

Orders
- Ordination: 11 July 1926 by José Alves Correia da Silva

Personal details
- Born: 4 February 1903 Aldeia-Nova, Olival, Ourém, Portugal
- Died: 25 September 1984 (aged 81) Marrazes, Leiria, Portugal

José Galamba de Oliveira GOIH (4 February 1903 – 25 September 1984) was a Portuguese Catholic priest, teacher, and historian of the apparitions of Our Lady of Fátima.

== Biography ==
José Galamba de Oliveira was born in Aldeia-Nova, Olival, in Ourém, in 1903, the son of José Joaquim de Oliveira and Cecília da Conceição Galamba, both merchants.

He did his primary schooling in Olival, then entered the Patriarchal Seminary in Santarém in 1914. He studied at the Pontifical Gregorian University in Rome, achieving a doctorate in Philosophy in 1922 and a bachelor's degree in Theology and Canon Law, He returned to Portugal for his health in 1924, and finished his theological studies in 1926 at the Leiria Seminary. He was ordained priest in the Cathedral of Leiria on 11 July 1926, celebrating his First Mass in the Sanctuary of Fátima on 13 July.

He taught at the Seminary and other schools in Leiria. He was active in the Acção Católica movement, scouting, and in the regional press. He was the founder of the weekly religious newspaper A Voz do Domingo (1933), writing about the mission of the Church, the defense of Christian values and principles and other topics. In 1943, he was appointed Canon of the Cathedral of Leiria, and Monsignor in 1983.

His life had an intimate connection to the 1917 apparitions of Our Lady of Fátima. He was familiar with Cova da Iria since the age of 4 or 5, as he was the nephew and godson of the parish priest, Father Manuel Joaquim de Oliveira. In 1917, he learned about the apparitions through Father Manuel Nunes Formigão at the Santarém Seminary; and was present with a group of other seminarians on the day of the fifth apparition, on 13 September 1917. When he returned to Portugal in 1924, he witnessed the construction of the Sanctuary of Fátima, where he celebrated his first Mass following his ordination in 1926; in 1928 he penned an account of the pilgrimage and ceremonies of the laying of the foundation-stone of the Basilica of Our Lady of the Rosary, for L'Osservatore Romano. He sought to study and disseminate the 1917 apparitions of Our Lady of Fátima and its message through articles, essays and works ("Fátima à prova", 1946; "Jacinta", "História das aparições"). He was a close friend of the visionary Lúcia dos Santos and was part of a small group of people who could visit her in the Carmel of Coimbra without prior authorization from the Holy See.

He accompanied the image of the Pilgrim Virgin to North America (1947–48) and was national president of the Blue Army of Our Lady of Fátima. He founded the Escola de Formação Social Rural de Leiria (Social Rural Training School in Leiria) in 1956 and was its director for nearly three decades. One of his last major initiatives was the organisation and editorial direction of a monumental Illustrated Bible, in 7 volumes (1957–1974).

During the "Ongoing Revolutionary Process" period that followed the Carnation Revolution in 1974, Galamba played an important role in the anti-communist resistance in the Leiria region. He died on 25 September 1984, at the age of 81, in Marrazes, Leiria.

== Distinctions ==
=== National orders ===
- Grand Officer of the Order of Prince Henry the Navigator (13 March 1967)
