= Sanctuary of the Apparitions =

Sanctuary in Pontevedra, Spain

- Sanctuary of the Immaculate Heart of Mary
- Santuario de las Apariciones
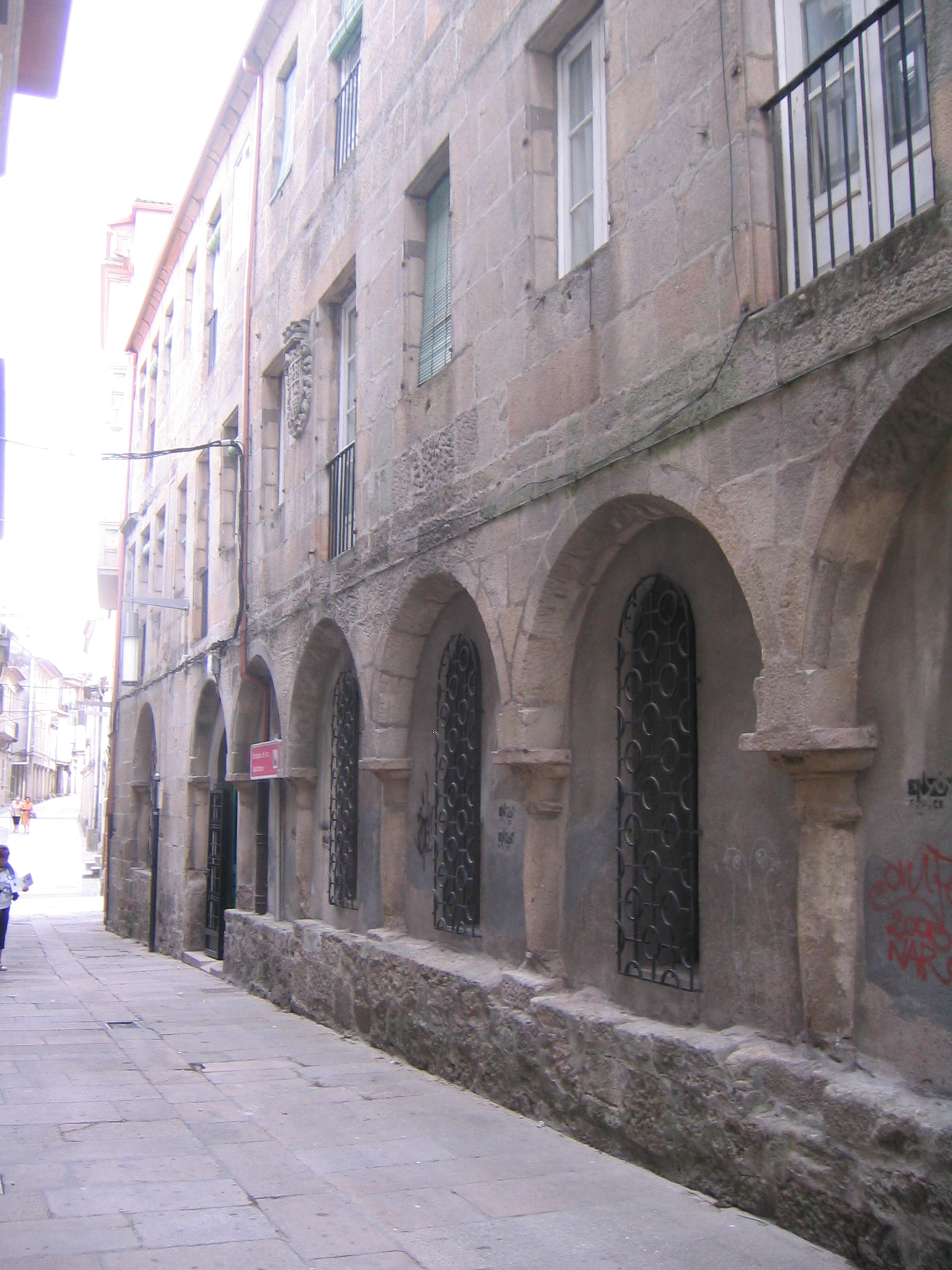
- Facade of the sanctuary
- Sanctuary of the Apparitions
- 42°26′02.2″N 8°38′47.4″W
- Location: Pontevedra, Spain
- Denomination: Catholicism
- Website: www.casadelinmaculadocorazon.es

History
- Events: Pontevedra apparitions

Administration
- Diocese: Roman Catholic Archdiocese of Santiago de Compostela

The Sanctuary of the Apparitions (Santuario das Aparicións in Galician and Santuario de las Apariciones in Spanish) is a Catholic convent and sanctuary located in Pontevedra, Spain. According to Sister Lúcia, it was here that the Child Jesus and the Blessed Virgin Mary appeared to her in 1925-1926 and revealed to her the First Saturdays Devotion.

It is the third most visited Marian pilgrimage destination in the world, with over 12 million visits recorded up to 2022. The sanctuary is also known as the "Spanish Fátima".

== History ==
The sanctuary is located at 3 Sor Lucía Street in the historic centre of Pontevedra.

On the site where the sanctuary is located, there was a building from the early Middle Ages, of which traces of stonemasonry and a walled door with decorative reliefs have been preserved.

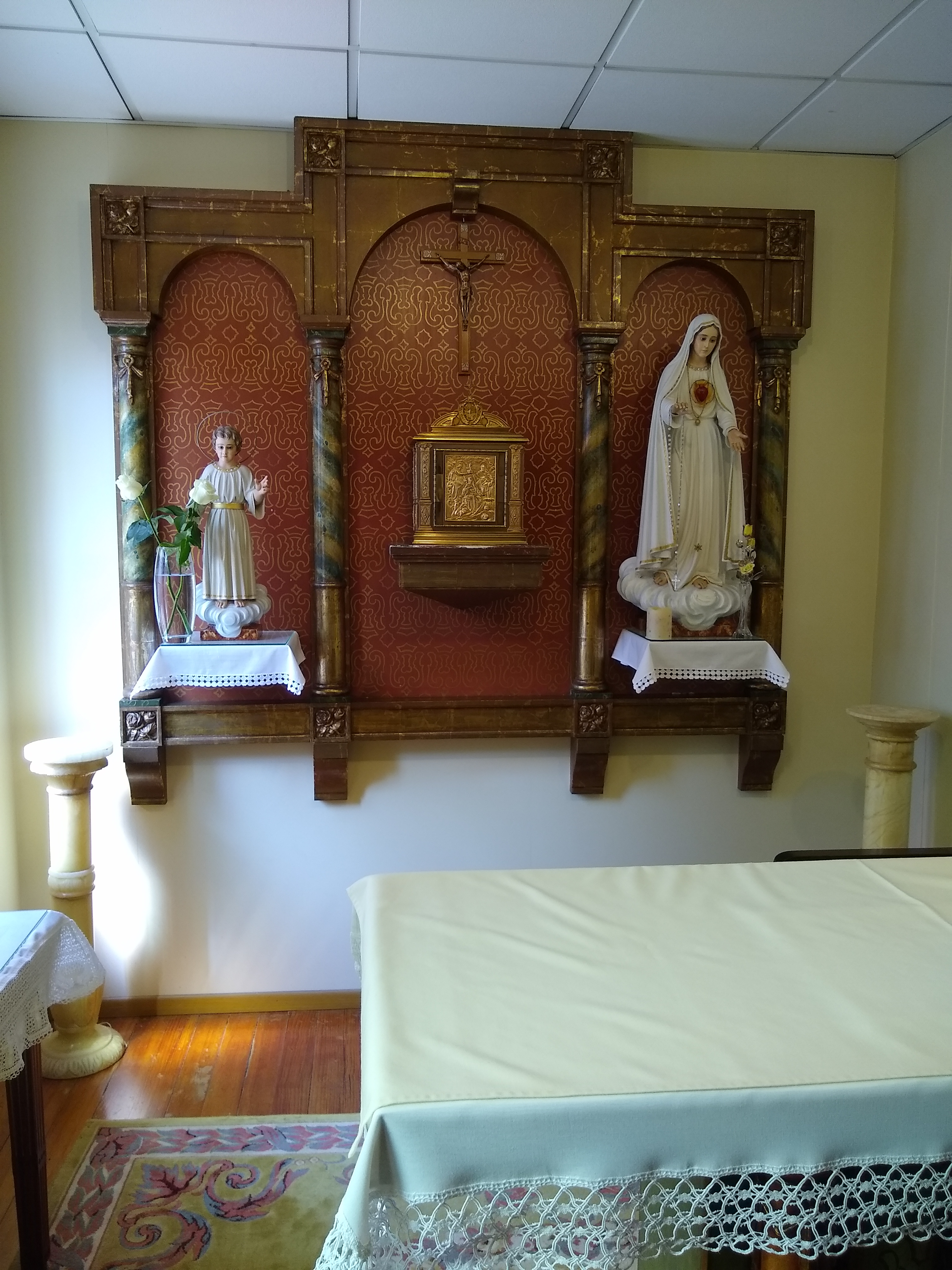
Sister Lúcia's cell, now a chapel

The building was constructed in the mid-16th century. In the 19th century, the building was the palace of the Arias Teijeiro family (Antonio and José, father and son), the latter being a Carlist politician and universal minister.

In 1918, the Marquis of Riestra rented the building to the Dorothean sisters, who opened a school there. In 1925, Sister Lúcia, one of the three visionaries of Fátima, Portugal, became a Dorothean sister in Galicia. While in her room in this convent in Pontevedra two months after her arrival, on 10 December 1925, Sister Lúcia had a vision of the child Jesus and the Virgin Mary with her heart surrounded by thorns. The second apparition took place on 15 February 1926 in the convent garden, where the Child Jesus urged her to do more to promote the devotion.

In 1927, Sister Lúcia wrote that the Virgin Mary had revealed to her the First Saturdays Devotion in 1925, which consists of going to confession, receiving Holy Communion every first Saturday of the month for five months (in reparation for five types of blasphemy), praying the rosary and meditating on its mysteries.

Pope John Paul II granted it the status of a sanctuary in 2000 on the occasion of the 75th anniversary of the apparitions.

The building was renovated in 2022, with the refurbishment of the second floor and a new roof.

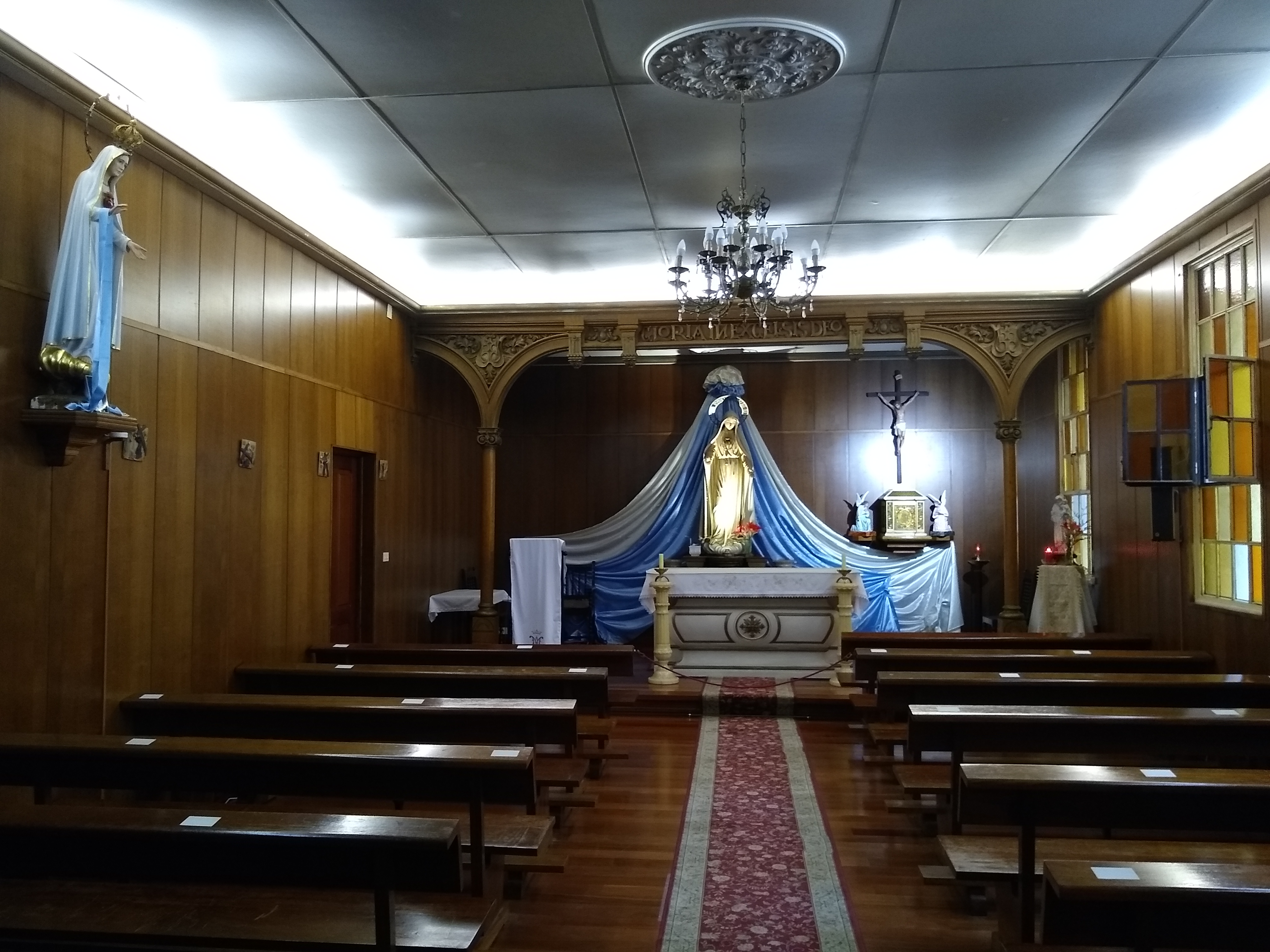
Main chapel

== Description ==
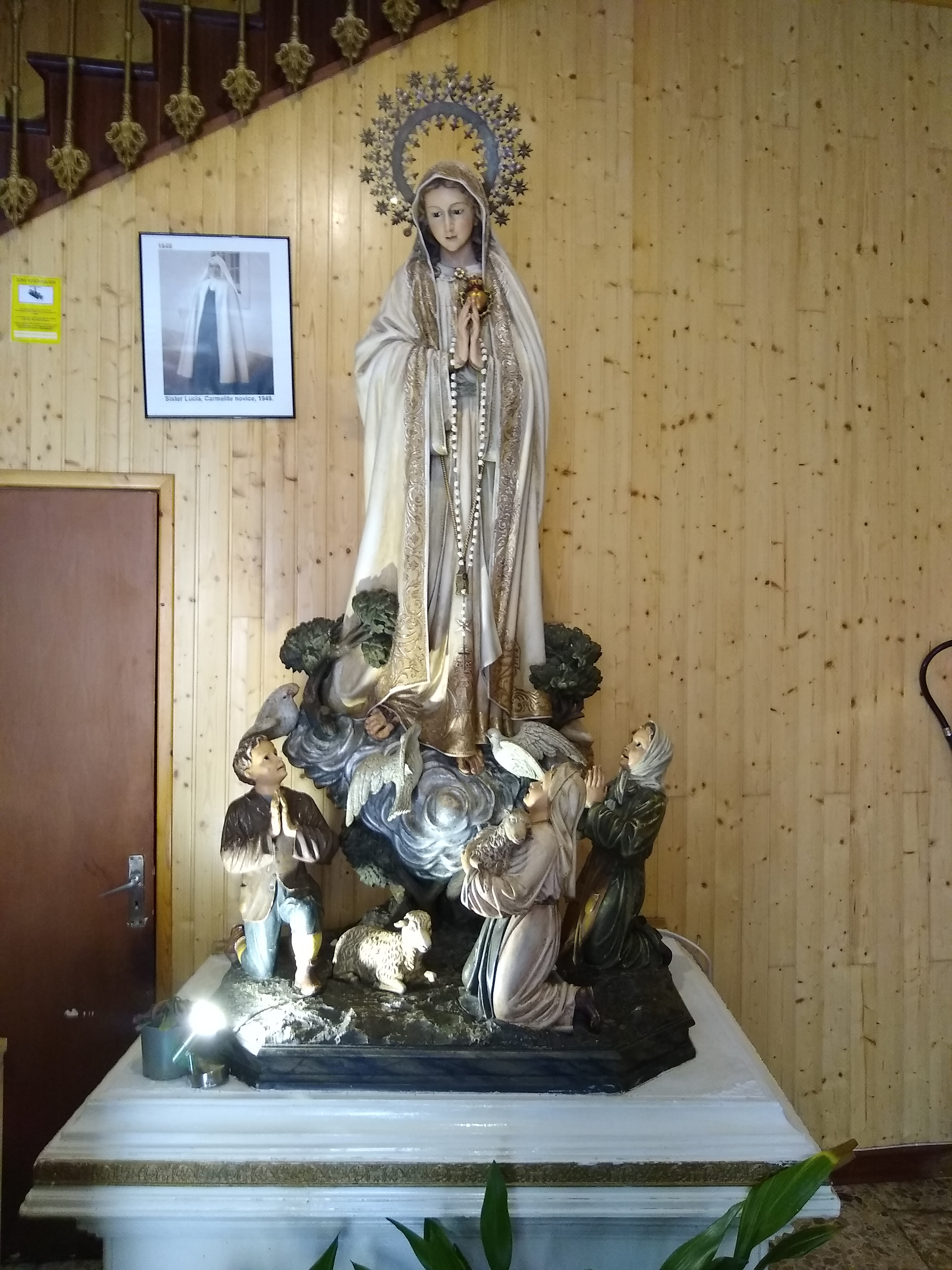
Statue of the Virgin of Fatima

The shrine has a simple, two-storied façade made of stone. On the ground floor, 15th-century semicircular arches supported by Tuscan half-columns frame the door and windows.

Inside, there is the main chapel (on the ground floor) and a smaller chapel where the Child Jesus and the Virgin Mary had appeared to Sister Lúcia, the visionary of Fátima. There is also a walled doorway with an ogee arch from the 16th century. The covent's hostel rooms are on the first floor. Sister Lúcia's cell, where the Virgin Mary appeared to her, is on the second floor. The old medieval cloister, dating from the end of the 15th century, had semicircular arches supported by Tuscan columns.

== See also ==
- Pontevedra apparitions
- Shrines to the Virgin Mary
