= First Saturdays Devotion =

Set of Catholic devotions

The First Saturdays Devotion, also called the Communion of Reparation to the Immaculate Heart of Mary, is a Catholic devotion which, according to Lúcia dos Santos, was requested by the Virgin Mary during the apparitions of Our Lady of Fátima in Fátima, Portugal, on 13 May 1917, as well as during apparitions in Pontevedra, Spain, on 10 December 1925 and 15 February 1926.

The purpose of this devotion is to perform acts of reparation to the Immaculate Heart of Mary, and a promise of assistance at the hour of death by Mary was reportedly attached to this devotion during the Pontevedra apparitions.

The First Saturdays devotion was approved by José Alves Correia da Silva, the bishop of Leiria-Fátima, on 13 September 1939 in Fátima.

== History ==
The pious custom of honoring the Virgin Mary on Saturday is an ancient one, largely attributed to the Benedictine monk Alcuin (735–804), "Minister of Education" at the court of Charlemagne. He composed a Votive Mass formulary for each day of the week, assigning two to Saturday in honor of Mary. The practice was quickly adopted by both clergy and laity.

The practice of reparation to the Immaculate Heart of Mary on the First Saturday was initiated in Rovigo, Italy, by Maria Dolores Inglese, a Servite tertiary in 1889. She started among her friends the pious practice of "Communion in Reparation to the Immaculate Heart of Mary". The practice was endorsed by Bishop Antonio Polin of the Diocese of Adria and was taken up by sodalities throughout Italy and elsewhere. On 1 July 1905, Pope Pius X approved and granted indulgences for the practice of the First Saturdays of twelve consecutive months in honor of the Immaculate Conception. This practice greatly resembled the later reported request of the Blessed Virgin Mary at the Pontevedra apparitions.

Inglese wished to establish a religious congregation dedicated to the apostolate of Marian reparation. Bishop Tommaso Pio Boggiani recommended she join the Servite sisters, known for their devotion to Our Lady of Sorrows. She joined the Servites as Sister Maria Dolores in 1911, and with foundress Mother Mary Elisa Andreoli revised their rule, making propagation of Communion of Reparation on the First Saturday of each month the congregation's main apostolate. They also changed the name of the group from "Servants of Mary" to "Servants of Mary of Reparation". The sisters subsequently published a monthly magazine that helped spread the devotion throughout Europe.

== Fátima ==
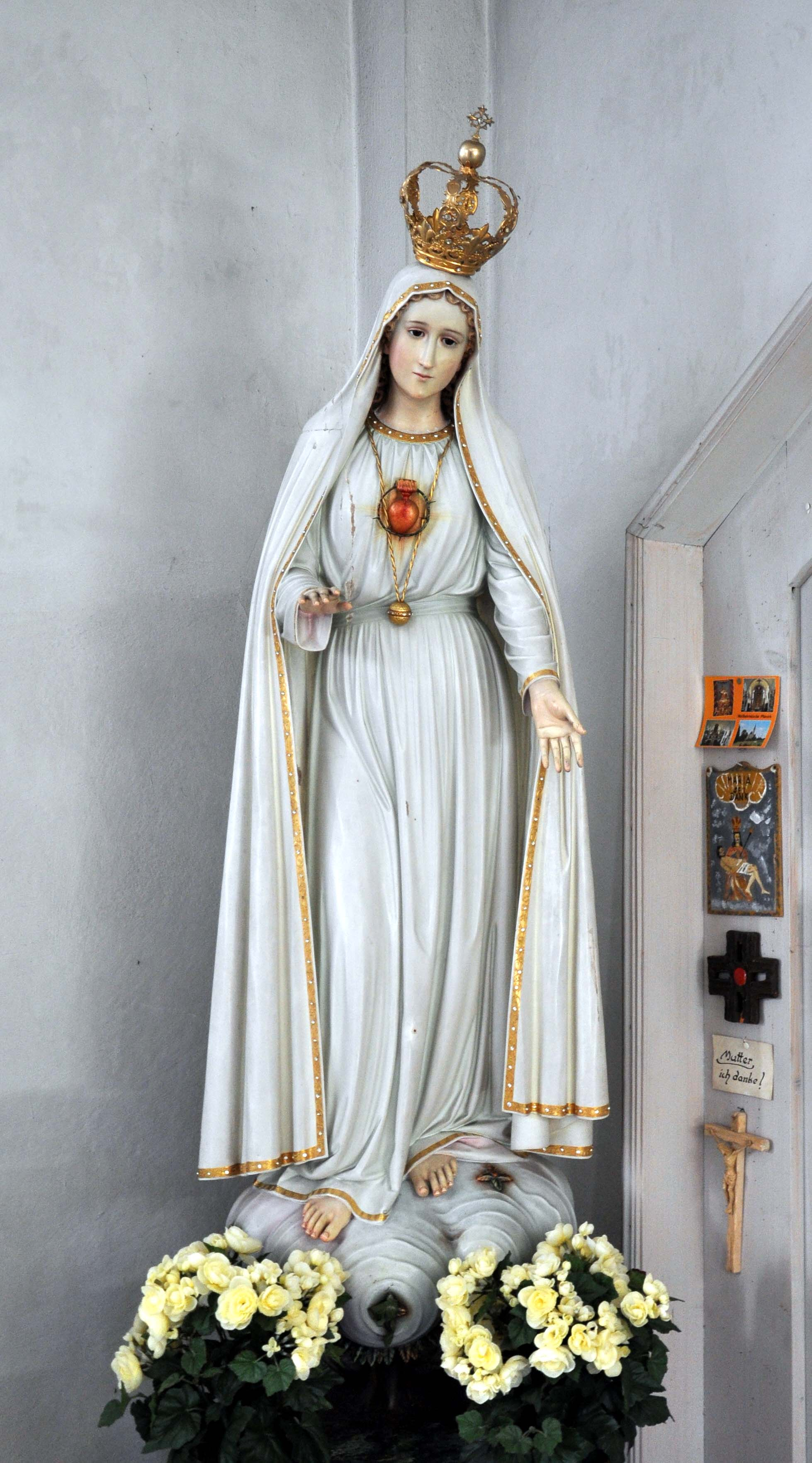
A religious statue depicting the Immaculate Heart of Mary as it was revealed in the 1917 Marian apparitions which occurred at Fátima, Portugal

At the age of 10, Lúcia dos Santos, one of the three Portuguese seers of the Marian apparitions of Our Lady of Fátima, reported in her 1941 memoir that Mary asked the following during the third apparition in Fátima on 13 July 1917.

The war is going to end. But if people do not stop offending God, another, even worse one will begin in the reign of Pius XI. When you shall see a night illuminated by an unknown light know that this is the great sign that God gives you that He is going to punish the world for its many crimes by means of war, hunger, and persecution of the Church and the Holy Father. To prevent it, I shall come to ask for the consecration of Russia to my Immaculate Heart and the Communion of reparation on the first Saturdays.

According to Lúcia, this was the first reported request for the First Saturdays Devotion directly from Mary, who told Lúcia that she was to return and ask again for the establishment of the devotion. This request is part of the approved message of Our Lady of Fátima, and was a requested intended to help prevent what became World War II. The purpose of this devotion is to perform acts of reparation for sins committed against the Immaculate Heart of Mary.

Lúcia had written in 1939: "Whether the world has war or peace depends on the practice of this devotion, along with the consecration to the Immaculate Heart of Mary."

== Pontevedra ==
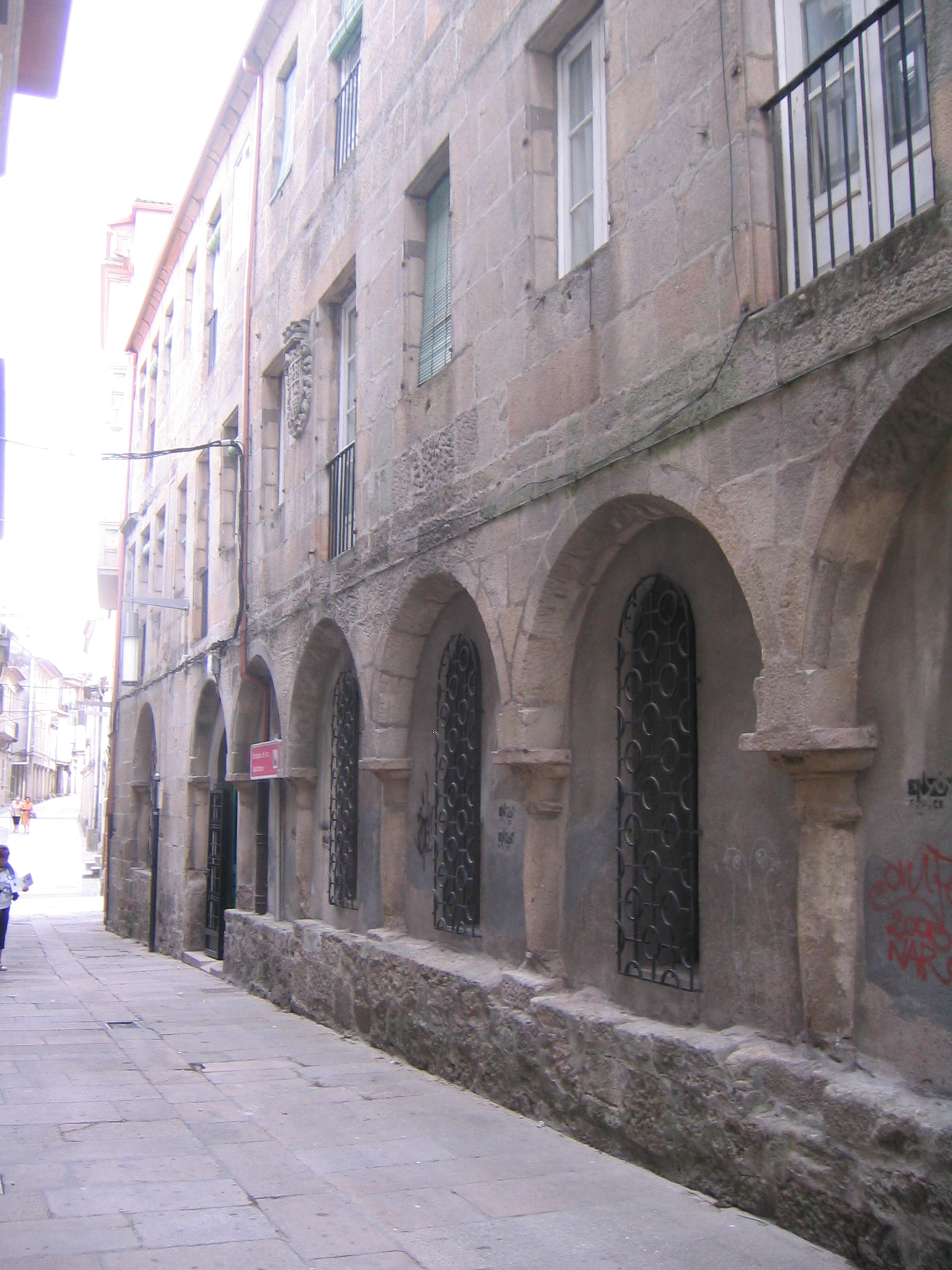
Dorothean convent in Pontevedra, now known as the Sanctuary of the Apparitions, in which Sister Lúcia lived and received Marian apparitions

Four years later on 17 June 1921, Lúcia dos Santos at the age of 14 was admitted as a boarder in the school of the Sisters of Saint Dorothy in Vilar, close to the city of Porto. On 24 October 1925, she entered the Institute of the Sisters of Saint Dorothy as a postulant in the convent in Tui, Spain, just across the northern Portuguese border.

According to a document she wrote, later recorded in her book Fatima in Lucia's Own Words, Lúcia reported how on 10 December 1925, the Virgin Mary appeared to her at the Dorothean convent in Pontevedra, and by her side on a luminous cloud was the Child Jesus. According to Lúcia, Mary requested the institution of the Devotion of the Five First Saturdays in reparation to her Immaculate Heart and attached a personal promise to the devotion:

Look, my daughter, at my Heart, surrounded with thorns with which ungrateful men pierce me at very moment by their blasphemies and ingratitude. You at least try to console me and say that I promise to assist at the hour of death, with the graces necessary for salvation, all those who, on the first Saturday of five consecutive months, shall confess, receive Holy Communion, recite five decades of the Rosary, and keep me company for fifteen minutes while meditating on the fifteen mysteries of the Rosary, with the intention of making reparation to Me.

On 15 February 1926, Lúcia reported an encounter while emptying a garbage can outside the garden, where she saw a child she thought she recognized. After speaking with the child, the child asked her: "Have you revealed to the world what the Heavenly Mother has asked you?". The child then transformed into the Child Jesus, who reproached Lúcia for not doing more to promote the First Saturdays Devotion. He also expressed sorrow that "many souls begin them, but few finish them", and lamented the lack of fervor and spirit of reparation. Following this conversation, the Child Jesus eased the conditions of the devotion, as they are known today.

== Devotion ==
=== Practice of the five First Saturdays ===
The First Saturdays Devotion consists of a series of practices that must be performed on five consecutive first Saturdays of the month. Each one of these practices should be done with the intention of making reparation for sins against the Immaculate Heart of Mary.

1. Go to Sacramental confession. The confession can be made up to eight days before or after the first Saturday, but the individual must be in a state of grace to receive Communion. The confession should be made with the intention of reparation, and if this intention is forgotten, it can be formed at the next confession.
2. Receive Holy Communion. It can be received at a Saturday daily mass or at a Saturday evening anticipatory Mass.
3. Pray five decades of the Rosary.
4. Keep Mary company while meditating on one or more of the mysteries of the Rosary for 15 minutes, in addition to the recitation of the Rosary.

According to Lúcia dos Santos, a promise of assistance at the hour of death and all the graces necessary for salvation was made by the Virgin Mary during the Pontevedra apparition on 10 December 1925.

=== Sins against the Immaculate Heart of Mary ===
In response to a written inquiry from her confessor, Lúcia prayed to Jesus asking about the significance of the five First Saturdays on 30 May 1930, in the convent of Tui. According to Lúcia, Jesus revealed that the five First Saturdays are linked to five specific offenses committed against the Immaculate Heart of Mary.

1. Blasphemies against the Immaculate Conception.
2. Blasphemies against her perpetual virginity.
3. Blasphemies against her divine maternity, while refusing at the same time to recognize her as Mother of men.
4. The blasphemies of those who publicly seek to implant in the hearts of children indifference, contempt, or even hatred towards the Immaculate Mother.
5. The offenses of those who outrage her directly in her holy images.

== Church approval ==
On 13 September 1939, the local bishop of the Leiria-Fátima diocese, José Alves Correia da Silva, approved the First Saturdays Devotion at the diocesan level. The Holy See has still not officially approved this devotion at the level of the universal Church, despite Lúcia's efforts.

== See also ==
- Acts of Reparation to the Virgin Mary
- First Thursdays Devotion
- First Fridays Devotion
- Immaculate Heart of Mary
- Our Lady of Fátima
- Sanctuary of the Apparitions
