= Gondemaria e Olival =

- Civil parish
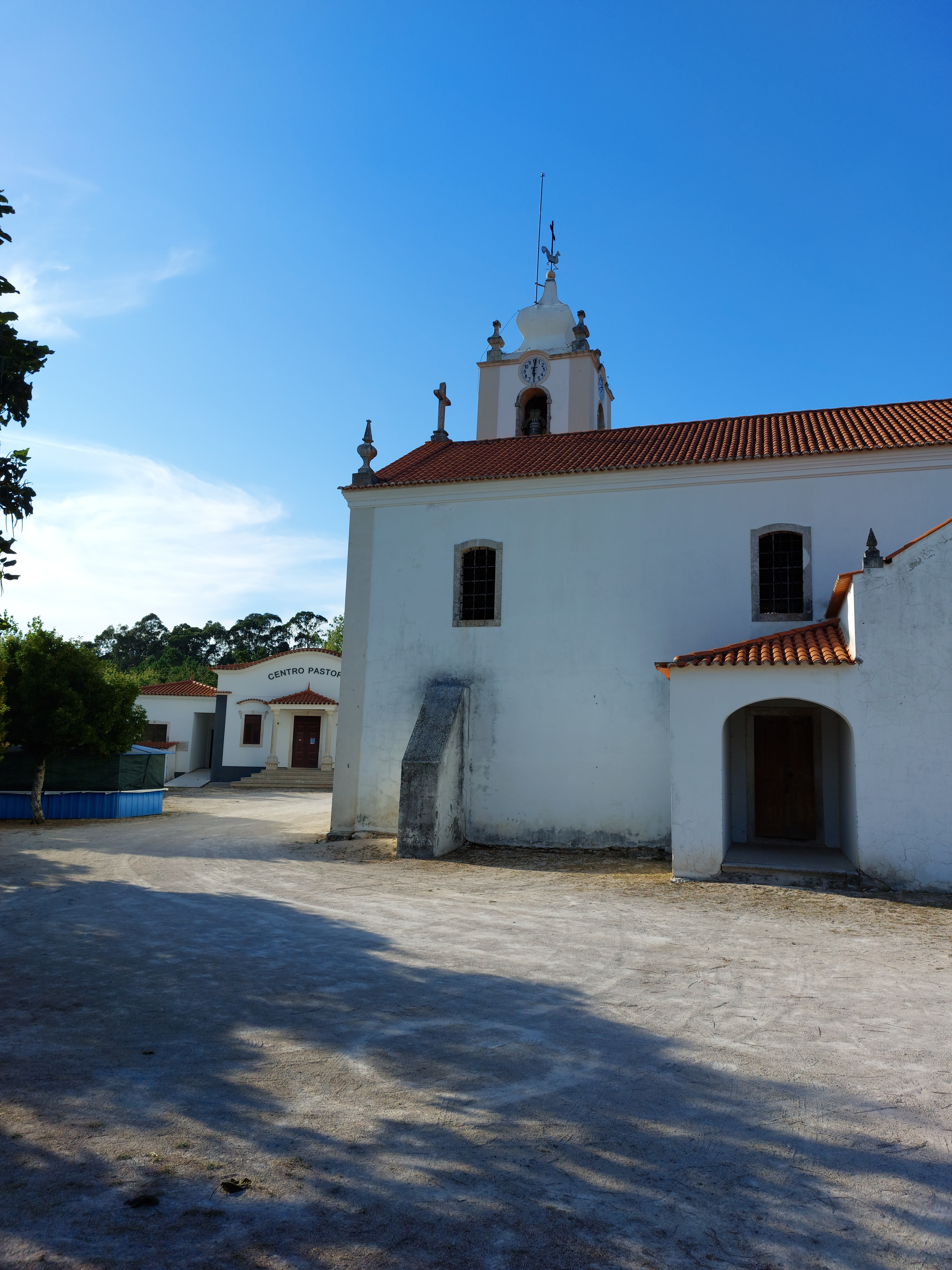
- Parish Church of Nossa Senhora da Purificação

- Location in Portugal
- Coordinates: 39°42′26″N 8°36′14″W
- Country: Portugal
- Region: Oeste e Vale do Tejo
- Intermunic. comm.: Médio Tejo
- District: Santarém
- Municipality: Ourém

Area
  - Total: 30.11 km^{2} (11.63 sq mi)

Population (2011)
  - Total: 3,170
  - Density: 105/km^{2} (273/sq mi)
- Time zone: UTC+00:00 (WET)
  - Summer (DST): UTC+01:00 (WEST)

Gondemaria e Olival is a civil parish in the municipality of Ourém, Portugal. It was formed in 2013 by the merger of the former parishes of Gondemaria and Olival. The population in 2011 was 3,170, in an area of 30.11 km^{2}.
