= Consecration of Russia to the Immaculate Heart of Mary =

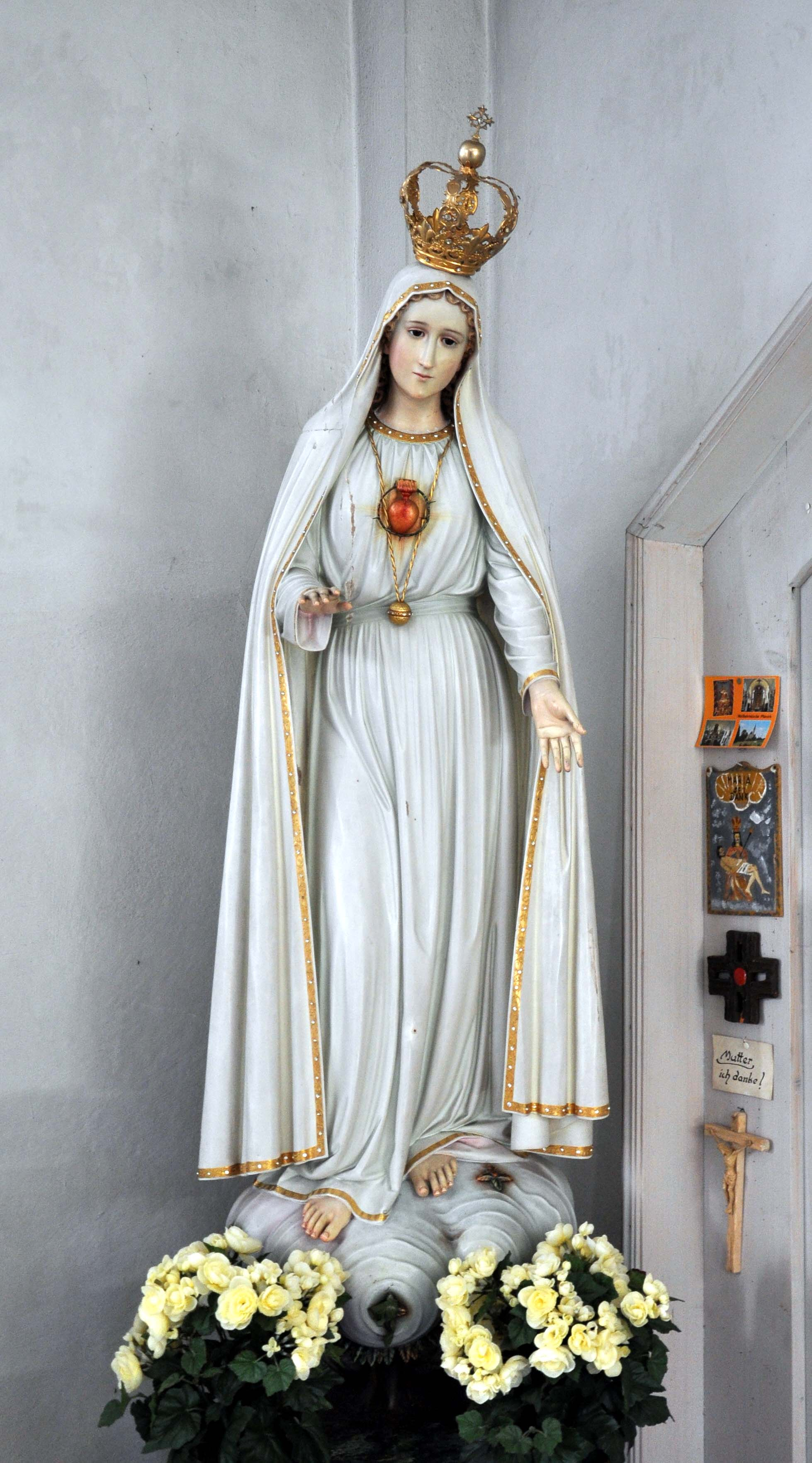
Our Lady of Fátima, with her Immaculate Heart surrounded with thorns, a necklace chain with a golden ball of light, and barefooted as described by Lúcia dos Santos OCD

The consecration of Russia to the Immaculate Heart of Mary by a reigning pope was requested during a Marian apparition by Our Lady of Fátima on 13 July 1917, according to Lúcia dos Santos (Sister Lúcia), one of the three visionaries who claimed to have seen the apparition. Sister Lúcia said that at different times the Blessed Virgin Mary had given her a message of promise that the consecration of Russia to the Immaculate Heart of Mary would usher in a period of world peace.

Popes Pius XII, Paul VI and John Paul II all consecrated Russia to the Immaculate Heart of Mary, although without specifically referencing Russia or the USSR. On March 25, 2022, Pope Francis consecrated Russia to the Immaculate Heart of Mary, alongside Ukraine, with both countries mentioned for the first time. This occurred during the Russian invasion of Ukraine.

== Background ==
=== Consecration of Russia ===
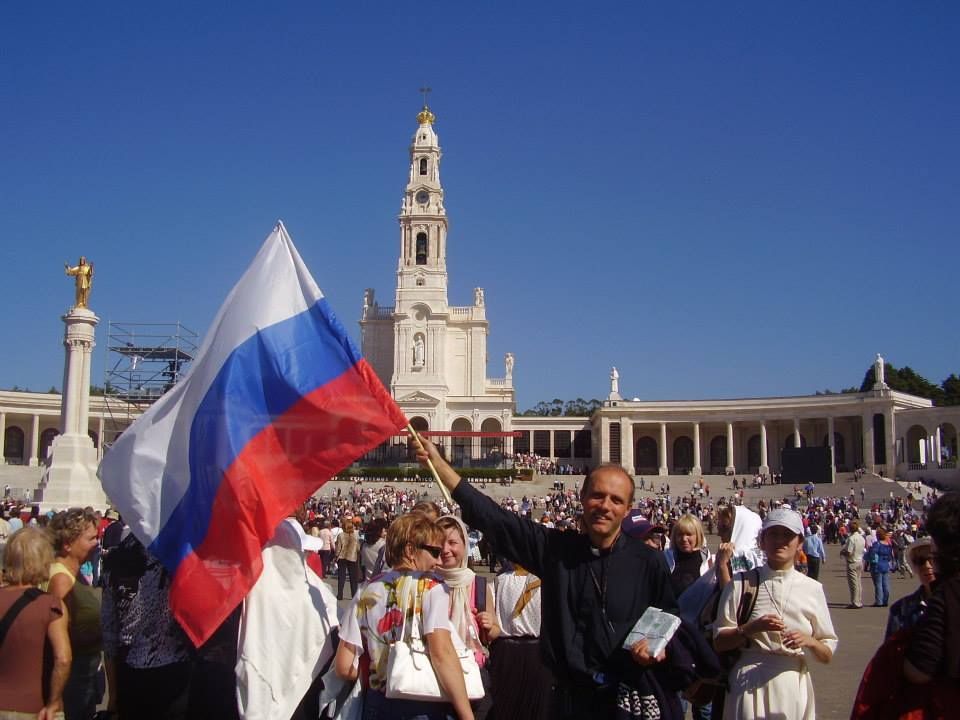
Russian priest and pilgrims in the Sanctuary of Fátima, in Portugal.

According to Sister Lúcia, the Virgin Mary requested the consecration of Russia to her Immaculate Heart both at Fátima in 1917 and, later, more explicitly at Pontevedra in 1929.

In two letters she sent in May 1930 to Father Gonçalves, her confessor, Sister Lúcia linked the consecration of Russia with the Devotion of the Five First Saturdays, which she had first discussed in context of the apparitions she had purportedly experienced previously as a postulant at Pontevedra in 1925. The Church has issued no decision regarding the reported visions at Pontevedra. In August 1941, Sister Lúcia wrote her memoir in which she described the apparition of 13 July 1917. She said that the Blessed Virgin Mary told them:

"God wishes to establish in the world devotion to my Immaculate Heart. If what I say to you is done, many souls will be saved and there will be peace. The [First World] war is going to end; if people do not cease offending God, a worse one will break out during the pontificate of Pius XI. When you see a night illumined by an unknown light, know that this is the great sign given you by God that He is about to punish the world for its crimes, by means of war, famine, and persecutions of the Church and of the Holy Father. To prevent this, I shall come to ask for the consecration of Russia to my Immaculate Heart, and the communion of reparation on the first Saturdays. If my requests are heeded, Russia will be converted, and there will be peace. If not, she will spread her errors throughout the world, causing wars and persecutions of the Church. The good will be martyred, the Holy Father will have much to suffer, various nations will be annihilated. In the end, my Immaculate Heart will triumph. The Holy Father will consecrate Russia to me, and she will be converted, and a period of peace will be granted to the world."

Some Catholics who support the position of the Catholic Church claim that the apparitions at Fátima took place after the February Revolution of 1917 that deposed Tsar Nicholas II from power and the April 16 return of Vladimir Lenin to Russia.

=== Categorised as private revelation ===
The alleged message given by the Virgin Mary at Fátima is considered a private revelation.

The teaching of the Roman Catholic Church distinguishes between "public Revelation" and "private revelations". The term "public Revelation" finds its literary expression in the Bible and "reached its fulfilment in the life, death and resurrection of Jesus Christ". In this regard, Catechism of the Catholic Church quotes John of the Cross:

"In giving us his Son, his only Word (for he possesses no other), he spoke everything to us at once in this sole Word—and he has no more to say... Any person questioning God or desiring some vision or revelation would be guilty not only of foolish behavior but also of offending him, by not fixing his eyes entirely upon Christ and by living with the desire for some other novelty."

== Consecrations ==
=== 20th century ===
In 1942, Pope Pius XII consecrated the whole of humanity, which implicitly included Russia but not by name, to the Immaculate Heart of Mary. This consecration was made in the context of the reported messages from Jesus and the Virgin Mary received by Alexandrina of Balazar and communicated to her spiritual director, the Jesuit priest Mariano Pinho. In 1952, he consecrated "the peoples of Russia" to the Immaculate Heart in Sacro vergente anno, although it was notably not done in communion with bishops worldwide (as requested by Our Lady of Fátima).

In 1964, Pope Paul VI also consecrated humanity, and thus implicitly Russia, to the Immaculate Heart of Mary at the end of the third session of Vatican II.

In 1981 and 1982, Pope John Paul II also consecrated the whole human race to the Immaculate Heart of Mary.

All those previous consecrations were done not in communion and coordination with the Catholic bishops of the world.

In 1983, Pope John Paul II set out to rectify any errors that had occurred with the previous consecrations; and on December 8, 1983, he sent a letter to all bishops worldwide, Catholic and Orthodox, asking them to join him in March 1984 for an Act of Entrustment to the Immaculate Heart of Mary. Before doing the consecration, the pope consulted Sister Lúcia so as to make sure this consecration of Russia would be valid. However, on March 25, 1984, Pope John Paul II did not mention Russia when he declared an act of consecration of "those men and nations who are in special need of this entrustment and consecration." After John Paul II's consecration, Sister Lúcia stated numerous times that the 1984 consecration had been done the way the Virgin Mary wanted it to be.

=== 21st century ===
At the formal request of the Episcopal Conference of Ukrainian Catholic Bishops, the Holy See announced on 15 March 2022 that Pope Francis would consecrate Russia and Ukraine to the Immaculate Heart of Mary on 25 March 2022 at Saint Peter's Basilica in Rome. The 25 March date is the same date as when John Paul II consecrated Russia to the Immaculate Heart in 1984. A consecration ceremony was also scheduled in Fátima, Portugal by the papal almoner, Cardinal Konrad Krajewski. Accordingly, the Pope sent a letter to invite all the Catholic bishops to join with him in the consecration, by their own volition, at the same designated time the consecration by the pope was to take place. He also invited all Catholic communities and all the faithful to join him in the consecration. The text of the consecration contains explicit mentions of "Russia and Ukraine" in the consecration formula.

The Saint Peter's Basilica consecration took place in conjunction with a penitential service, with Francis stating: "Mother of God and our mother, to your Immaculate Heart we solemnly entrust and consecrate ourselves, the church and all humanity, especially Russia and Ukraine". Cardinal Krajewski made a similar consecration in Portugal.

The text of the consecration contains the title "Earth of Heaven" to refer to Virgin Mary in some of its versions. This title raised concerns among some Catholics. The Holy See explained the origin of the title was "taken from a Byzantine-Slavic monastic hymn, and it poetically signifies the union of heaven and earth that we can contemplate in Virgin Mary assumed bodily into Heaven".

== Conversion of Russia ==
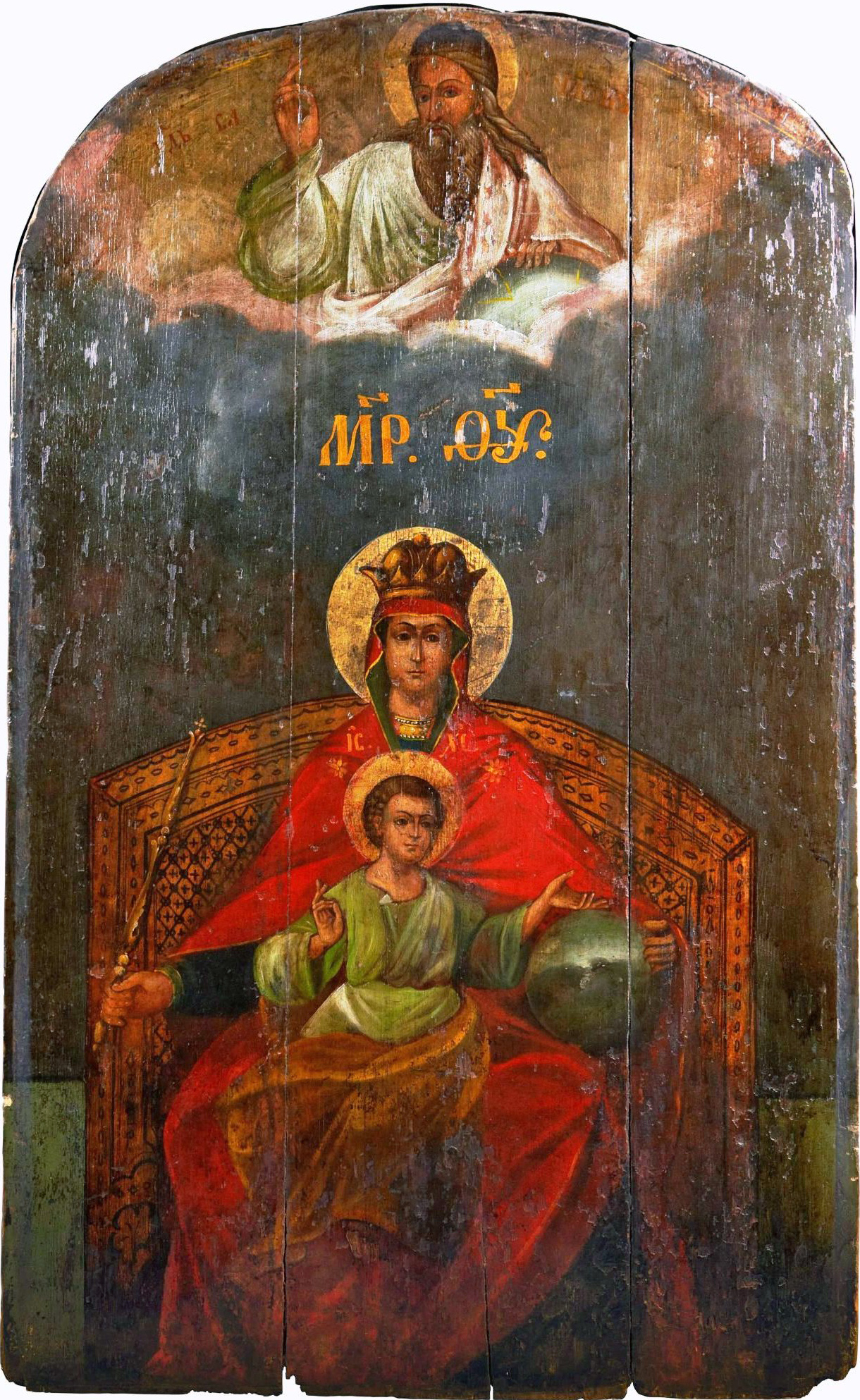
"Reigning" Icon of the Theotokos

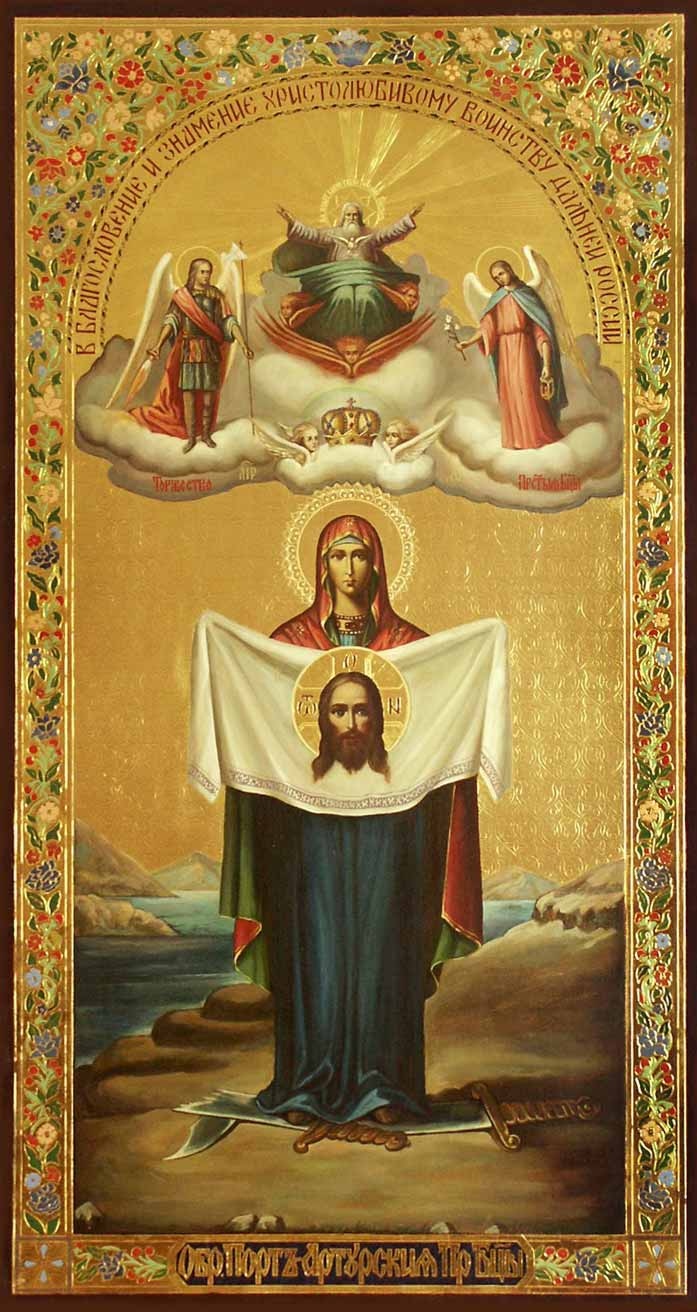
"Port Arthur" Icon of the Theotokos

In 1946, during a gathering of youth at Fátima, Sister Lúcia was asked by a young Russian girl, Natacha Derfelden, as to how the conversion of Russia would be accomplished. Sister Lúcia responded that "the conversion of Russia would be completed through the Orthodox Church and the Oriental rite." At Domus Pacis, the international headquarters of the World Apostolate of Fátima, there is the Russian Greek Catholic chapel of the Dormition, where the "Vatican copy" of the Kazan icon of the Mother of God was enshrined before its eventual return to Russia in 2004.

A theological commentary written by Cardinal Joseph Ratzinger on the Fátima secret cites it as a "conversion of the heart".

In 2003 and 2014, the "Reigning" and the "Port Arthur" icons of the Mother of God were brought for veneration to Fátima.

== See also ==
- Consecration and entrustment to Mary
- Act of Consecration to the Sacred Heart of Jesus
