= Immaculate Heart of Mary =

Catholic devotional title of Mary

The Immaculate Heart of Mary
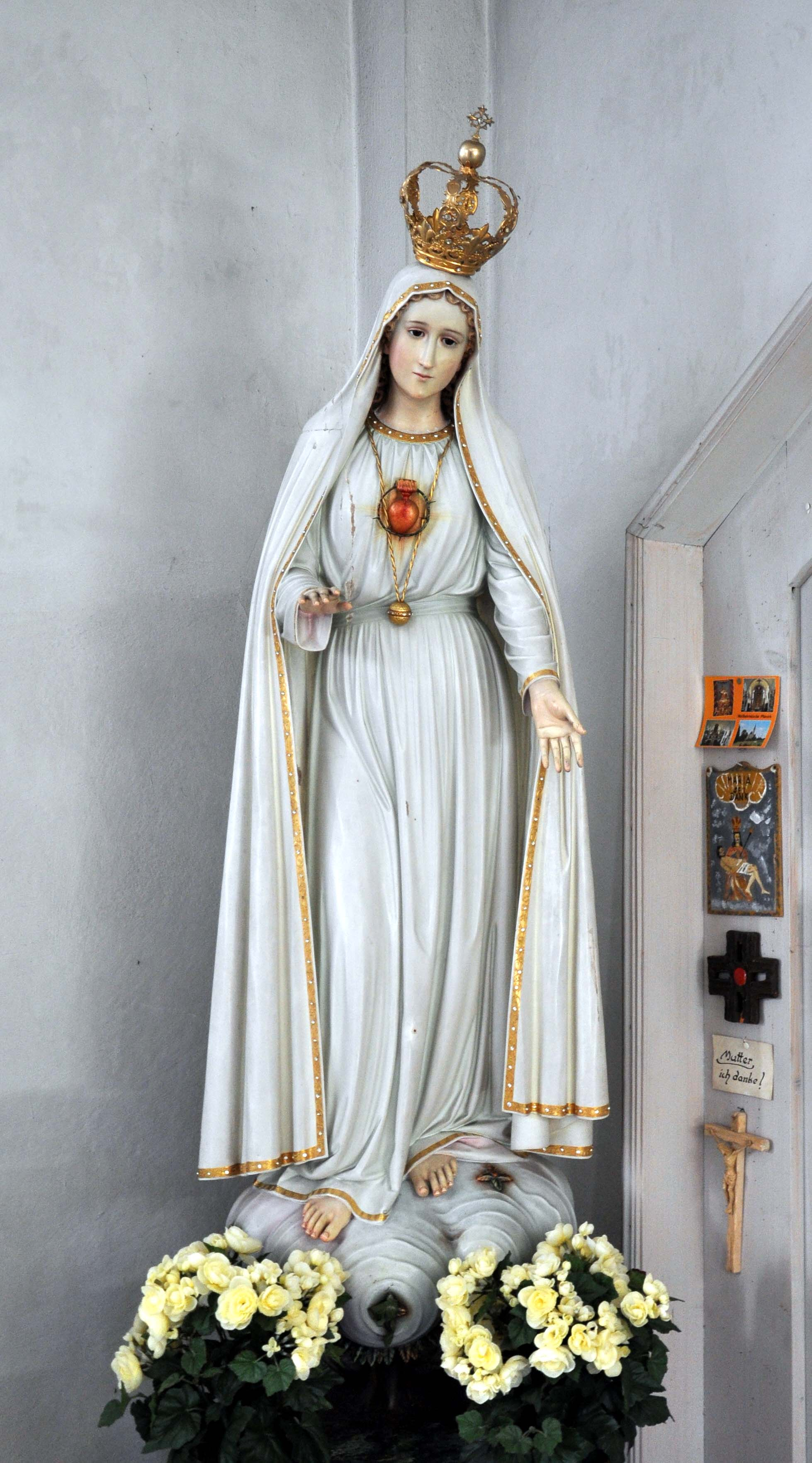
- Statue of the Immaculate Heart of Mary as revealed on the Marian apparitions of Fátima
- Venerated in: Catholic Church
- Feast: Saturday following the Feast of the Sacred Heart
- Attributes: Burning bloodied heart, pierced with a sword, banded with roses, and lily flowers
- Patronage: Apostleship of Prayer, Ratnapura Diocese, Alliance of Sacred Hearts, Russian Territories, Scotland, Central Africa, Republic of the Congo, Angola, Ecuador, Panama, Minglanilla, Cebu, Philippines, and, Georgia

The Immaculate Heart of Mary (Latin: Cor Immaculatum Mariae) is a Catholic devotion which refers to the view of the interior life of Mary, her joys and sorrows, her virtues and hidden perfections, and, above all, her virginal love for God the Father, her maternal love for her son Jesus Christ, and her motherly and compassionate love for all mankind. Traditionally, the Immaculate Heart is depicted pierced with seven swords or wounds, in homage to the seven dolors of Mary and roses, usually red or white, wrapped around the heart.

The Eastern Catholic Churches occasionally utilize the image, devotion, and theology associated with the Immaculate Heart of Mary. However, this is a cause of some controversy, some seeing it as a form of Liturgical Latinisation. The Catholic view is based on their understanding of certain verses of scripture, particularly the Gospel of Luke.

== Veneration ==
The veneration of the Heart of Mary is analogous to the veneration of the Sacred Heart of Jesus. There are, however, differences in this analogy as devotion to the heart of Jesus is especially directed to the "divine heart" as overflowing with love for humanity. In the devotion to Mary, however, the attraction is the love of her heart for Jesus and for God. Catholic church teaching states that Mary's role as mother of humanity and veneration paid to her in this capacity "in no way obscures or diminishes [the] unique mediation of Christ, but rather shows its power".

The second difference is the nature of the devotion itself: in the devotion to the Sacred Heart of Jesus, the Catholic venerates in a sense of love responding to love; in the devotion to the Heart of Mary, study and imitation hold as important a place as love. The aim of the devotion is to unite humankind to God through Mary's heart, and this process involves the ideas of consecration and reparation.

== History of devotion ==
=== Scriptural basis ===
In chapter 2 of the Gospel of Luke, it is twice stated that Mary kept all things in her heart, that there she might ponder over them. Luke 2:35 recounts the prophecy of Simeon that her heart would be pierced with a sword. This image (the pierced heart) is the most popular representation of the Immaculate Heart.

The Gospel of John further invites attention to Mary's heart with its depiction of Mary at the foot of the cross at Jesus' crucifixion. Augustine of Hippo said of this that Mary was not merely passive at the foot of the cross; "she cooperated through charity in the work of our redemption". Augustine says that she was more blessed in having borne Christ in her heart than in having conceived him in the flesh.

=== Various saints ===
Reference to the Immaculate Heart of Mary can be found as early as Ildefonsus of Toledo (607-670), who in his Libellus de Corona Virginis wrote: "But when it was pleasing to Him who had chosen you from your mother's womb, your immaculate heart was moved with pity for us. Then - by the assistance of your maternal hand - we were led from the domain of darkness to sanctity's realm of infinite light."

Devotion to the Heart of Mary began in the Middle Ages with Anselm of Canterbury, and Bernard of Clairvaux. It was practiced and developed by Mechtilde, Gertrude the Great and Bridget of Sweden. Evidence is also discernible in the pious meditations on the Ave Maria and the Salve Regina, usually attributed either to Anselm of Lucca (d. 1080) or Bernard; and also in the large book "De laudibus Beatae Mariae Virginis" (Douai, 1625) by Richard de Saint-Laurent, Penitentiary of Rouen in the 13th century.

Bernardino of Siena (d. 1444), is sometimes called "Doctor of the Heart of Mary", and from him the church has borrowed the lessons of the second nocturn for the feast of the Heart of Mary. Francis de Sales speaks of the perfections of this heart, the model of love for God, and dedicated his "Theotimus" to it.

During this same period one finds occasional mention of devotional practices to the Heart of Mary, e.g., in the "Antidotarium" of Nicolas du Saussay (d. 1488), in Pope Julius II, and in the "Pharetra" of Lanspergius. In the second half of the 16th century and the first half of the 17th, ascetic authors dwelt upon this devotion at greater length.

It was, however, John Eudes (d. 1681) who propagated the devotion, to make it public, and to have a feast celebrated in honor of the Heart of Mary, first at Autun in 1648 and afterwards in a number of French dioceses. He established several religious societies interested in upholding and promoting the devotion, of which his large book on the Coeur Admirable (Admirable Heart), published in 1681, resembles a summary. Jean Eudes' efforts to secure the approval of an office and feast failed at Rome, but, notwithstanding this disappointment, the devotion to the Heart of Mary progressed. Eudes began his devotional teachings with the Heart of Mary, and then extended it to the Sacred Heart of Jesus. However, it was only in 1805 that Pope Pius VII allowed a feast to honor the Immaculate Heart of Mary.

In 1699 the priest John Peter Pinamonti (d. 1703) published a short work on the Holy Heart of Mary in Italian, and in 1725, Joseph de Gallifet combined the cause of the Heart of Mary with that of the Heart of Jesus in order to obtain Rome's approbation of the two devotions and the institution of the two feasts. In 1729, his project was defeated, and in 1765, the two causes were separated, to assure the success of the principal one.

Two factors that helped the rapid progress of the devotion were the introduction of the Miraculous Medal by Catherine Laboure in 1830 and the establishment at Notre-Dame-des-Victoires, Paris of the Archconfraternity of the Immaculate Heart of Mary, Refuge of Sinners. More than four million Miraculous Medals were distributed throughout the world within four years and in 1838 Desgenettes, the pastor of Notre-Dame-des-Victoires, organized the Association in honor of the Holy and Immaculate Heart of Mary, which Pope Gregory XVI made a confraternity the same year. In July, 1855, the Congregation of Rites approved the Office and Mass for the Immaculate Heart.

In 1849 Anthony Mary Claret founded the congregation of Missionary Sons of the Immaculate Heart of Mary, commonly called the Claretians.

== Feast day ==
Dates for the Feast of the Immaculate Heart of Mary (Novus Ordo), 2017–2030
Year	Date (Novus Ordo)
2017	Impeded (would be on 24 June)
2018	9 June
2019	Impeded (would be on 29 June)
2020	20 June
2021	12 June
2022	25 June
2023	17 June
2024	8 June
2025	28 June
2026	13 June
2027	5 June
2028	Impeded (would be on 24 June)
2029	9 June
2030	Impeded (would be on 29 June)

In its principal object this feast is identical with the feast of the "Inner Life of Mary", celebrated by the Sulpicians on 19 October. It commemorates the joys and sorrows of the Mother of God, her virtues and perfections, her love for God and her Divine Son and her compassionate love for mankind.

As early as 1643, John Eudes and his followers observed 8 February as the feast of the Heart of Mary. In 1799 Pius VI, then in captivity in Florence, granted the Bishop of Palermo the feast of the Most Pure Heart of Mary for some of the churches in his diocese. In 1805 Pope Pius VII made a new concession, thanks to which the feast was soon widely observed. On 21 July 1855, the Congregation of Rites finally approved the Office and Mass of the Most Pure Heart of Mary without, however, imposing them upon the Catholic Church.

Pope Pius XII instituted the feast of the Immaculate Heart of Mary in 1944 to be celebrated on 22 August, coinciding with the traditional octave day of the Assumption. (Note: Compare 22 August in the Tridentine calendar with the same date on the General Roman Calendar as in 1954) In 1969, Pope Paul VI moved the celebration of the Immaculate Heart of Mary to the Saturday, immediately after the Solemnity of the Sacred Heart of Jesus. This means in practice that it is now held on the third Saturday after Pentecost.

At the same time as he closely associated the celebrations of the Immaculate Heart of Mary and the Sacred Heart of Jesus, Pope Paul VI moved the celebration of the Queenship of Mary from 31 May to 22 August, bringing it into association with the feast of her Assumption. Those who use the 1962 edition of the Roman Missal or an earlier one (but not more than 17 years before 1962) observe the day established by Pius XII.

It is kept as the patronal feast of the Congregation of the Holy Ghost, of the Society of the Sacred Hearts of Jesus and Mary, and of the Missionary Society of the Heart of Mary.

The celebration of this feast is omitted in those years when it is impeded by a higher ranking feast. This would apply when it is due to fall on 24 June (Nativity of St John the Baptist) and 29 June (Feast of Saints Peter and Paul), and more rarely 31 May (Visitation of the Blessed Virgin Mary) and 3 July (Saint Thomas the Apostle). (Note that there may be variations in local calendars. For example, this feast was not impeded in England and Wales in 2019 since the Feast of Saints Peter and Paul was celebrated on Sunday 30 June.)

The month of August is traditionally dedicated to the Immaculate Heart of Mary.

== Related devotions ==
=== Seven Sorrows ===
Traditional depictions of the Immaculate Heart of Mary often show it pierced by seven swords or wounds, a reference to seven major sorrows experienced by the Virgin Mary throughout her life, especially during the Passion of Christ. There are devotional practices and prayers dedicated to the meditation on these seven sorrows.

=== The Miraculous Medal ===
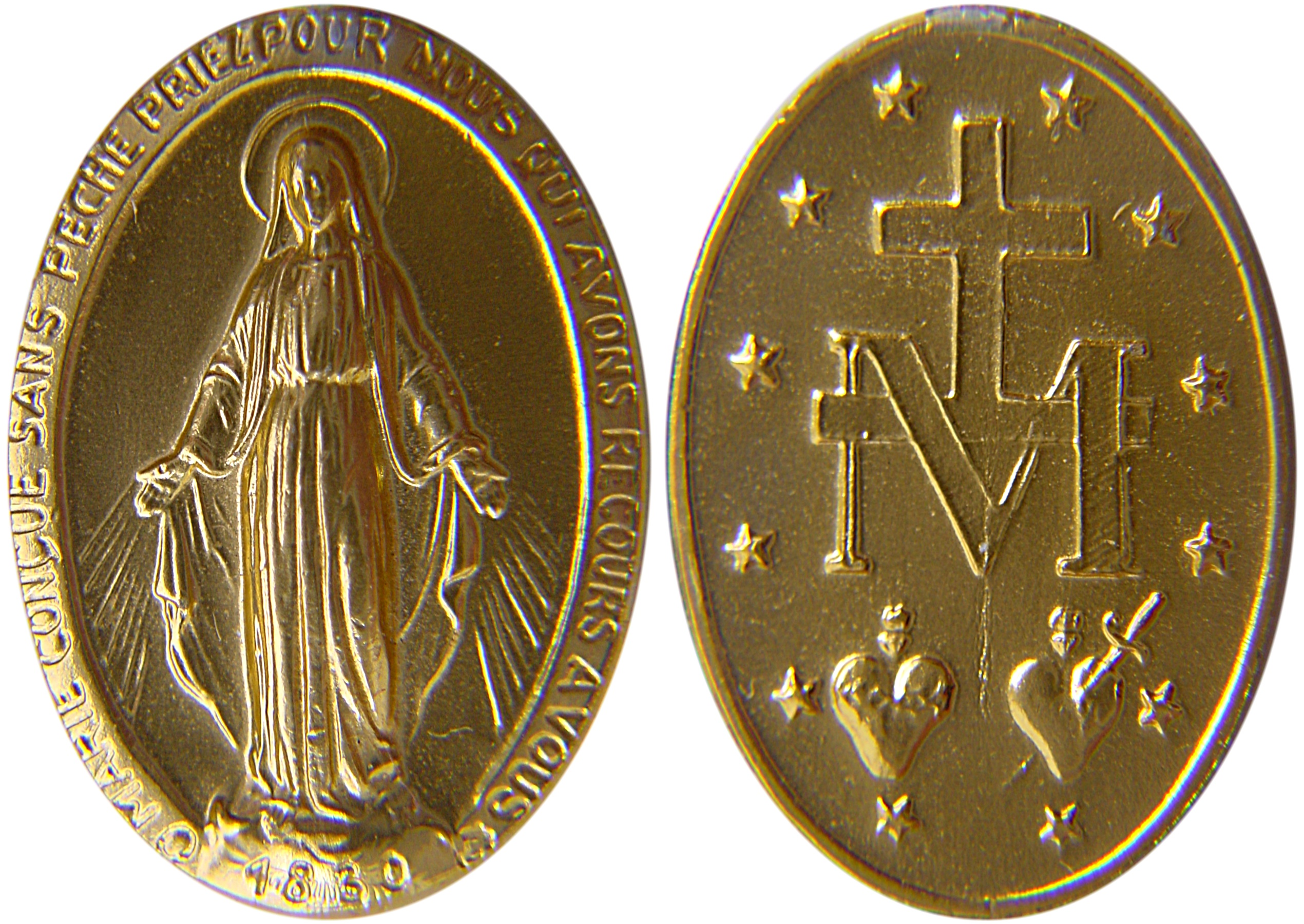
The Immaculate Heart pierced by a sword, appearing on the Miraculous Medal

Devotion to Virgin Mary's Immaculate Heart experienced significant growth following the Marian apparition to Catherine Labouré in 1830, during which Mary requested the production of the Miraculous Medal. The Immaculate Heart is depicted on the reverse side of the medal, pierced by a sword, symbolizing the prophecy of Simeon. The Sacred Heart of Jesus also appears on the medal, next to the Immaculate Heart, crowned with thorns.

=== Five First Saturdays ===
The First Saturdays Devotion is a devotional act of reparation to the Immaculate Heart of Mary which was, according to Lúcia dos Santos, requested by the Virgin Mary during her apparitions in Fátima, Portugal, in July 1917, and later in Pontevedra, Spain, in 1925 and 1926. The Virgin Mary reportedly asked that, in reparation for the sins committed against her Immaculate Heart, that a Catholic should, on the first Saturday of five consecutive months, go to Confession, receive the Holy Communion, recite five decades of the Rosary, and keep her company for 15 minutes while meditating on one or more of the mysteries of the Rosary, with the intent of making reparation. A promise of assistance at the hour of death from Mary, with the graces necessary for salvation, was reportedly associated with the First Saturdays Devotion during the Pontevedra apparitions.

=== Scapular of the Immaculate Heart of Mary ===
The "Scapular of the Immaculate Heart of Mary" is a Catholic devotional scapular. It originated in 1877 with the Sons of the Immaculate Heart of Mary (Claretians). It was sanctioned and endowed with indulgences by Pope Pius IX in May 1877. The scapular was later approved by the Congregation of Rites in 1907 and assigned indulgences.

The scapular is made of white fabric and the front has an image of the burning heart of Mary, out of which grows a lily; the heart is encircled by a wreath of roses and pierced with a sword. A Crux immissa or an image of Mater Misericordiæ appears on the reverse.

=== Badge of the Immaculate Heart of Mary ===
The "Badge of the Immaculate Heart of Mary", also known as "The Green Scapular", is a Catholic devotional scapular approved by Pope Pius IX in 1870. The development of the green scapular is based on visions reportedly experienced in 1840 by Justine Bisqueyburu, a member of the Daughters of Charity of Saint Vincent de Paul.

== Consecration of the world to the Immaculate Heart of Mary ==
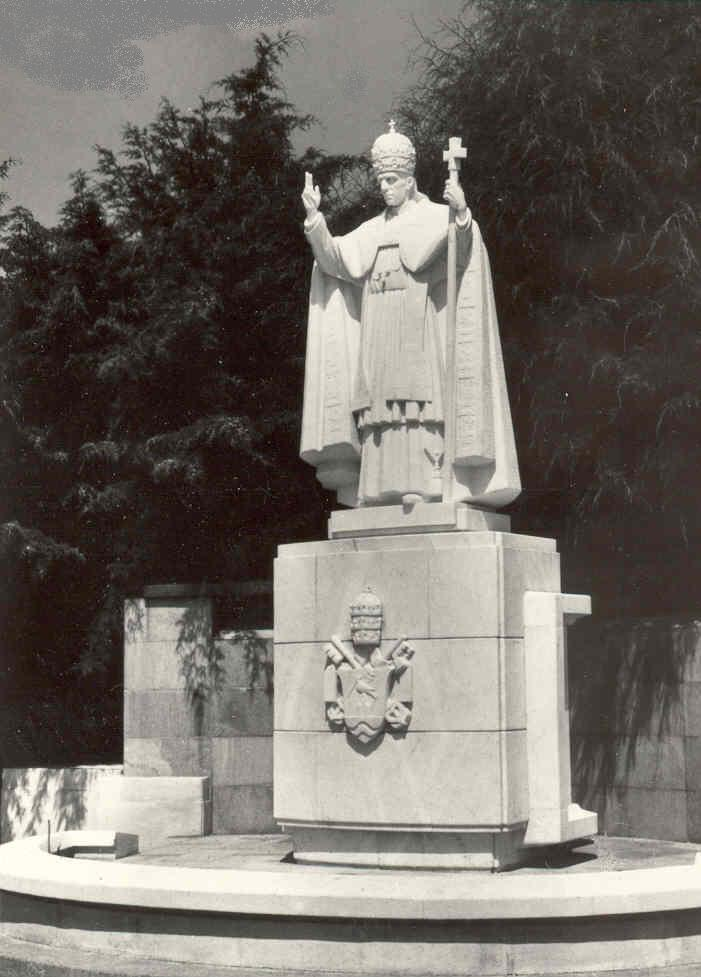
Fatima statue of Pope Pius XII

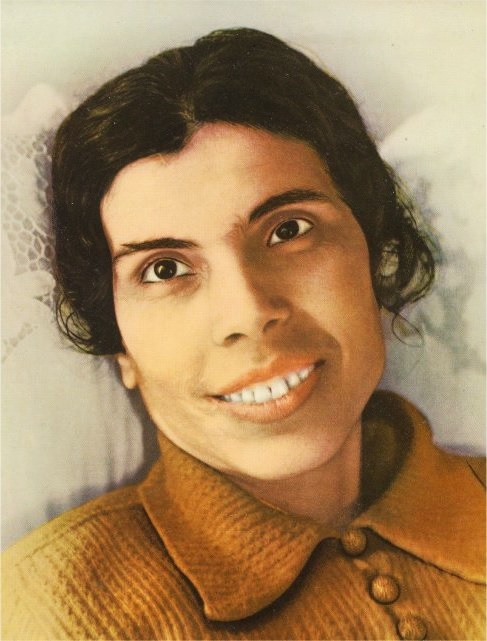
Blessed Alexandrina of Balazar was the great messenger of Jesus to the request of the consecration of the world to the Immaculate Heart of Mary made by Pope Pius XII

During the third apparition at Fátima, Portugal, on 13 July 1917, the Virgin Mary reportedly said to the three little shepherd visionaries: "God wishes to establish the devotion to her Immaculate Heart in the world" in order to save souls from hell and bring about world peace, and also asked for the consecration of Russia to her Immaculate Heart.

From the beginning of the 20th century the Holy See received many requests that the world be consecrated to the Immaculate Heart of Mary. In June 1938, the Portuguese bishops forwarded a request to Pius XI for the consecration of the world to the Immaculate Heart of Mary. They had themselves consecrated Portugal in May 1931. At that time Cardinal Eugenio Pacelli (later Pope Pius XII) was the secretary of the state of the Vatican, and later, based on Blessed Alexandrina of Balazar requests, he performed the consecration of the world.

- On October 31, 1942, Pius XII broadcast a radio address entitled Benedicite Deum to thousands of pilgrims who had come to Fatima to celebrate the Silver Jubilee of the last apparition of Our Lady. He concluded his address by consecrating the whole world to the Immaculate Heart of Mary:
  Finally, just as the Church and the entire human race were consecrated to the Heart of your Jesus, [...] so, in like manner, they are henceforth perpetually consecrated to you, to your Immaculate Heart, Oh our Mother, and Queen of the world: in order that your love and protection may hasten the triumph of the kingdom of God.
- Pius renewed the consecration again on December 8, 1942, at St. Peter's Basilica.
- Pope Paul VI renewed this consecration on November 21, 1964.
- On May 13, 1982, in Fatima, after concelebrating Mass, Pope John Paul II consecrated the whole world and peoples to the Immaculate Heart of Mary, "In a special way we entrust and consecrate to you those individuals and nations which particularly need to be entrusted and consecrated...The power of this consecration lasts for all time and embraces all individuals, peoples and nations."
- On December 8, 1982, the Solemnity of the Immaculate Conception, at the end of the Mass he celebrated in the Basilica of St. Mary Major, he renewed the act of consecration of the Church and the world to Mary before the image of Our Lady "Salus Populi Romani".
- On October 8, 2000, John Paul II made an act of entrustment of the world to the Immaculate Heart of Mary for the new millennium.
- Pope Francis renewed the consecration of the world to the Immaculate Heart of Mary on 13 October 2013 in Rome, as part of the Marian Day celebration that involved the iconic statue of Our Lady of the Rosary of Fátima.

=== Russia ===
- Pope Pius XII, in his Apostolic Letter of 7 July 1952 Sacro Vergente, consecrated the peoples of Russia to the Immaculate Heart of Mary.
- On 25 March 1984 Pope John Paul II made the solemn act of consecration of the world, and of Russia, to the Immaculate Heart of Mary before the miraculous statue of Our Lady of Fátima brought to Saint Peter's Square in the Vatican for the occasion.
- Pope Benedict XVI and Pope Francis both have re-consecrated the world to the Immaculate Heart in 2010 and 2013, respectively.
- During the 2022 Russian invasion of Ukraine, on 25 March 2022 – the Solemnity of the Annunciation – Pope Francis consecrated Russia and Ukraine to the Immaculate Heart of Mary in union with all Catholic bishops and priests from all over the world to implore an end to the war. This act of consecration was pronounced by the Pope Francis on the afternoon of Friday 25 March in St. Peter's Basilica, at the Vatican City, and, on the same day, Cardinal Konrad Krajewski, the papal almoner, performed the same act of consecration at Fátima, Portugal, as the envoy of the Pope.

== Countries consecrated to the Immaculate Heart of Mary ==
- In June 1938, Portuguese bishops, consecrated Portugal to the Immaculate Heart of Mary. On 13 May 2016, Cardinal Manuel Clemente together with all the bishops of the 21 Portuguese dioceses renewed his consecration.
- On 22 June 1947, as part of the National Marian Congress to Celebrate the Centenary of the Archdiocese of Ottawa, the bishops of the Dominion consecrated Canada to the Immaculate Heart of Mary. The consecration was renewed during the 1954 Marian year at the National Shrine of Our Lady of the Cape.
- On 16 July 1948 Cardinal Bernard William Griffin consecrated England and Wales to the Immaculate Heart of Mary. President of the Bishops' Conference of England and Wales, Cardinal Vincent Nichols renewed the consecration at Westminster Cathedral in early 2017.
- On 19 November 1959, Bishop Patrick O'Boyle of Washington, D.C. consecrated the United States to the Immaculate Heart of Mary. It was renewed by the U.S. bishops 11 November 2006.
- Philippines (22 August 1964, 8 June 2013, 4 May 2018, 13 May 2020, all the Catholic bishops of the Philippines – CBCP)
- Ireland (15 August 2013 – Cardinal Sean Brady, 25 March 2020 – Archbishop Eamon Martin)
- Nigeria (13 October 2017)
- Lithuania (11 February 2018 – Archbishop Gintaras Grušas)
- Netherlands, the Dutch diocese were consecrated to the Immaculate Heart of Mary on the 100 year anniversary of the Fatima apparitions – May 13, 2017
- Japan (1947)
- Brasil (1948; 13 May 2020 – Orani João Tempesta)
- Australia (1948); May 24, 2020, under the patronal title Our Lady Help of Christians.
- Italy (13 September 1959); the Italian Bishops' Conference, May 1, 2020, in the Basilica of Santa Maria del Fonte presso Caravaggio.
- Lebanon and Countries of the Middle-East (16 June 2013, 13 June 2016, Cardinal Bechara Boutros Rai)
- Cameroon (24 April 2022)
- Samoa (7 December 2007, 3 December 2017 – Archbishop Alapati Lui Mataeliga)
- On 25 March 2020, the Feast of the Annunciation, in Fatima, Cardinal António Marto, Bishop of the Diocese of Leiria–Fátima presided over the consecration of twenty-two countries to the Sacred Heart of Jesus and the Immaculate Heart of Mary. Although initially intended for Portugal and Spain, as the days drew close for the consecration, the episcopal conferences from twenty-two other countries expressed an interest in joining. Those countries included: Albania, Bolivia, Colombia, Costa Rica, Cuba, the Dominican Republic, East Timor, Guatemala, Hungary, India, Kenya, Mexico, Moldova, Nicaragua, Panama, Paraguay, Peru, Poland, Romania and Slovakia.
- Ukraine (23 October 2016 – Bishop Sviatoslav Shevchuk); 25 March 2022
- Russia and Countries of Central Asia (13 May 2017 – Cardinal Josef Cordes); 25 March 2022
- During the Gaza war, on 29 October 2023 Cardinal Pierbattista Pizzaballa consecrated the Holy Land and the Middle East to the Immaculate Heart of Mary imploring the gift of peace
- Netherlands, a solemn national consecration of the Netherlands to the Immaculate Heart of Mary will take place on the 5th of October in Eindhoven by Bishop Johannes van den Hende; 5 October 2024

== Dioceses consecrated to the Immaculate Heart of Mary ==
In 2017, in commemoration of the 100th anniversary of the apparitions at Fatima, a number of bishops consecrated or renewed a previous consecration of their dioceses to Mary under the title of the Immaculate Heart of Mary. Among these were: the Diocese of Birmingham, Alabama (14 January 2017, Bishop Robert J. Baker), Diocese of Tyler, Texas (13 May 2017, Bishop Joseph E. Strickland), Diocese of Kansas City-Saint Joseph, Missouri (13 May 2017, Bishop James Vann Johnston), Diocese of Providence, Rhode Island (13 May 2017, Bishop Thomas J. Tobin), Diocese of Worcester (MA) (June 3, 2017), Diocese of Lansing (Bishop Earl Boyea, August 13, 2017).

Also consecrated or re-consecrated were the Archdiocese of San Francisco, California (7 October 2017, Archbishop Salvatore J. Cordileone), Diocese of Phoenix, Arizona (13 October 2017, Bishop Thomas J. Olmsted), and the Diocese of St. Petersburg, Florida (6 May 2018, Bishop Gregory Parkes).

== See also ==
- Sacred Heart of Jesus
- Chaste Heart of Joseph
- Alliance of the Hearts of Jesus and Mary
- Veneration of Mary in the Catholic Church
- Immaculate Mary
- Rosarium Virginis Mariae – Pope John Paul II's Apostolic letter
- Sisters, Servants of the Immaculate Heart of Mary
- The Badge of the Immaculate Heart of Mary (Green Scapular)
- Devotions to the Sacred Heart of Mary
