= José Alves Correia da Silva =

Portuguese bishop (1872–1957)

The Most Reverend José Alves Correia da Silva
- Bishop of Leiria
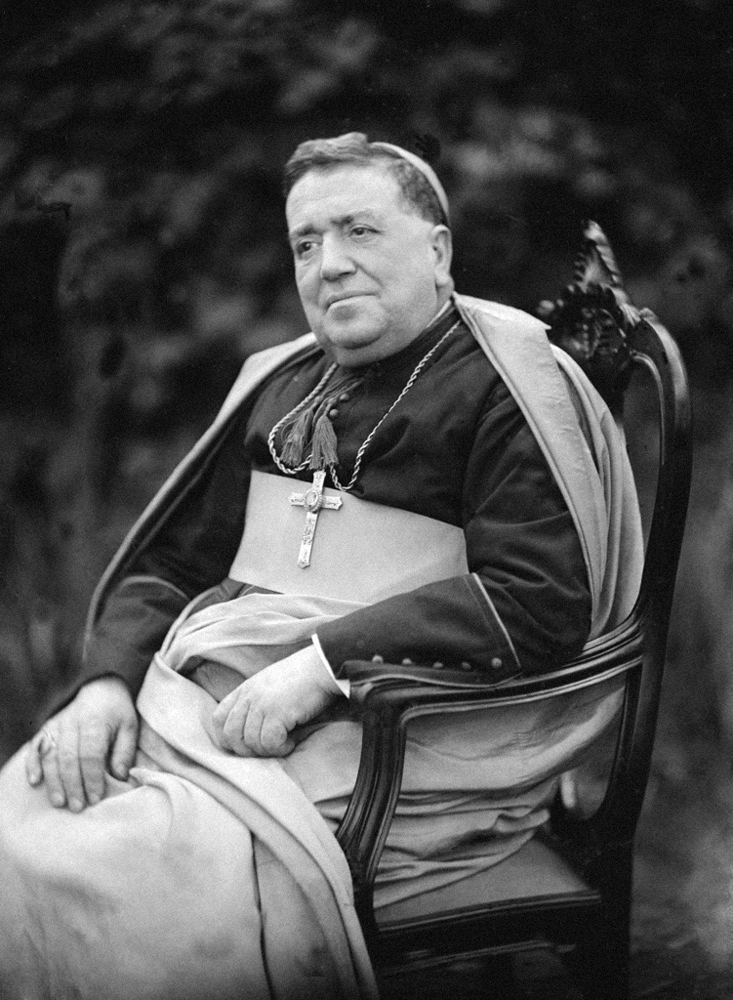
- Province: Lisbon
- Diocese: Leiria
- Installed: 5 August 1920
- Term ended: 4 December 1957

Orders
- Ordination: 5 August 1894
- Consecration: 25 July 1920 by António Barbosa Leão

Personal details
- Born: 15 January 1872 São Pedro de Fins, Kingdom of Portugal
- Died: 4 December 1957 (aged 85)
- Denomination: Roman Catholic
- Motto: ESCUTA, APRENDE E ANUNCIA COM ALEGRIA, ESPERANÇA E CARIDADE

Dom José Alves Correia da Silva (15 January 1872 – 4 December 1957) was a Portuguese priest. He was Bishop of Leiria from 1920 until his death in 1957.

He is best remembered for his part in the story of Our Lady of Fátima, and not least for his dealings with Sister Lúcia Santos in connection with the Three Secrets of Fátima.

== Life ==
José Alves Correia da Silva was born at São Pedro de Fins. After training for the priesthood he was ordained a priest on 5 August 1894, at the age of twenty-two, and began his service to the church at Oporto.

On 15 May 1920, he was appointed Bishop of Leiria, on 25 July was consecrated by Bishop António Barbosa Leão, Bishop of Oporto, and on 5 August was formally installed. He continued in this role for thirty-seven years, until his death.

In 1917, the Virgin Mary is said to have appeared several times to three children of Silva's diocese and to have entrusted them with three secrets, in connection with which there was later much confusion. On 13 October 1930, Dom José announced in a pastoral letter that he was giving official approval to the authenticity of the apparitions. He wrote

The visions of the children in the Cova da Iria are worthy of belief.

In 1941, Dom José asked the only survivor of the three children, who was now a nun, to clarify the secrets, to assist with the publication of a new edition of a book about her cousin Jacinta, another of the three children, who had died in 1920. At his request, Sister Lúcia wrote a document, detailing two of the secrets, which was passed to higher authorities.

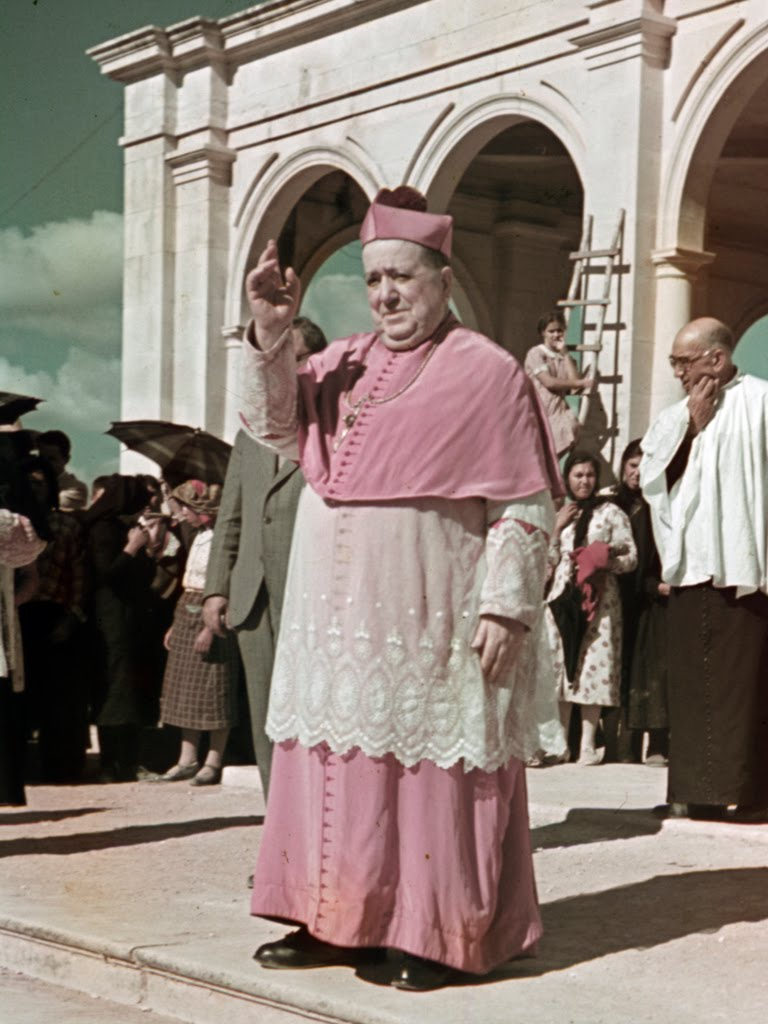
D. José leaving the Basilica of Our Lady of the Rosary of Fátima

In 1943 he asked Lucia to reveal the third secret, and she declined, on the grounds that she was "not yet convinced that God had clearly authorized her to act". In October 1943, when she was seriously ill and there were fears for her life, Dom José pressed her again, ordering her to put the third secret in writing. Lúcia obeyed, but sealed her statement into an envelope which was not to be opened until 1960 or until after her death, if earlier.

Dom José Alves Correia da Silva died on 4 December 1957.

== Memorials ==
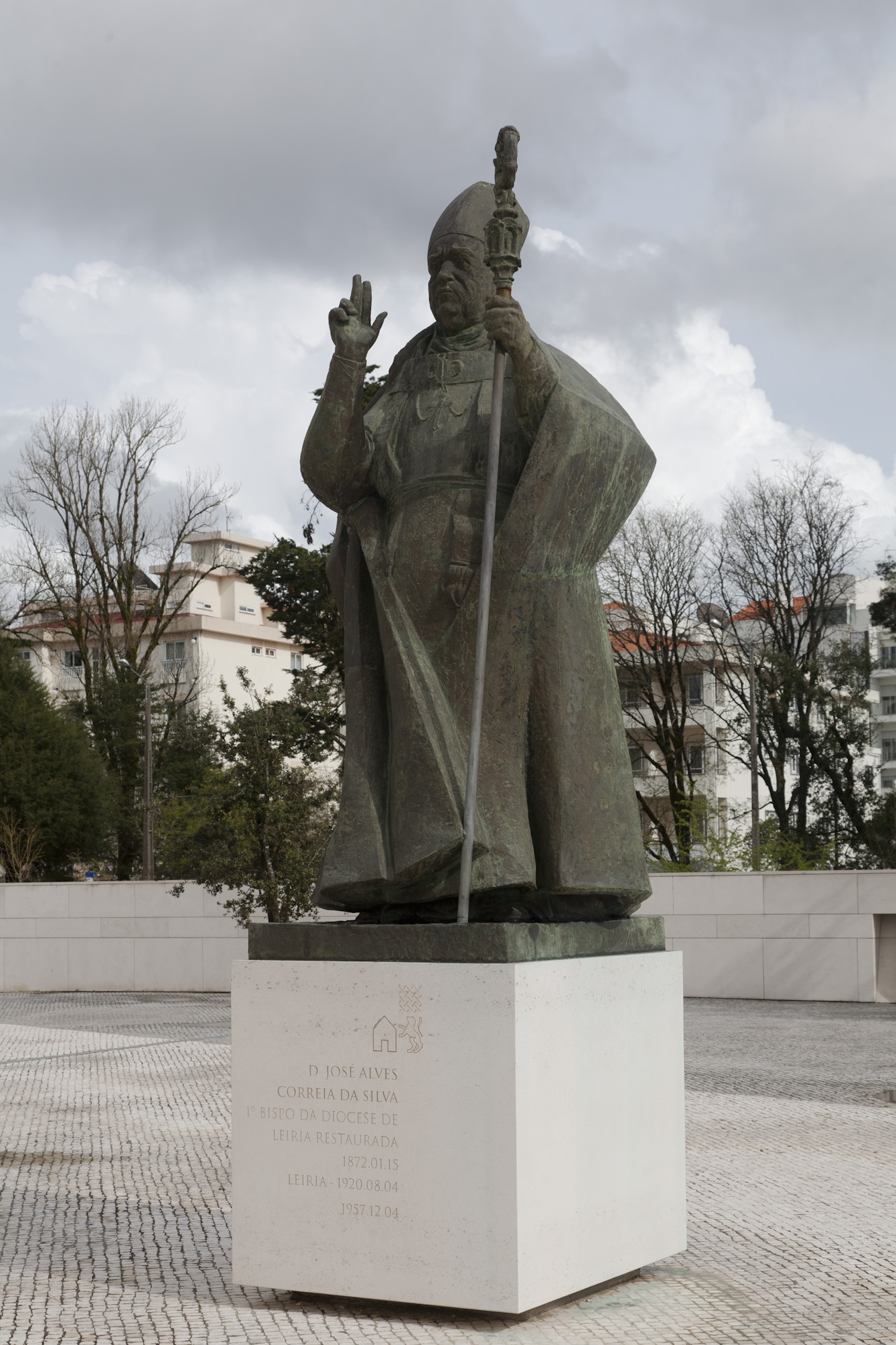
Statue of D. José in the Sanctuary of Our Lady of Fátima

A statue of Dom José by Joaquim Correia was later erected in the main square at Fátima, near another by Correia of Pope Pius XII. A street in the town has also been named "Avenida Dom José Alves Correia da Silva" in his memory and contains the town's bus station.
