= Romano Bottegal =

Italian Trappist

Venerable Romano Bottegal OCSO
- Born: 28 December 1921; San Donato di Lamon, Belluno, Kingdom of Italy
- Died: 19 February 1978 (aged 56); Beirut, Lebanon

Romano Bottegal, OCSO (28 December 1921 – 19 February 1978) was an Italian Trappist priest.

Bottegal joined the order in the 1940s and lived as a hermit in Lebanon. He studied in Belluno and Rome before he was ordained as a priest and following this lived in Rome among his peers; he moved to Lebanon to oversee a new project there but was forced to return to Rome after it failed. But he was later granted permission to return there in order to live as a hermit where he remained in seclusion until his death.

The beatification process for Bottegal launched in 2000. On 9 December 2013 he became titled as venerable once Pope Francis confirmed that Bottegal had lived a life of heroic virtue.

== Life ==
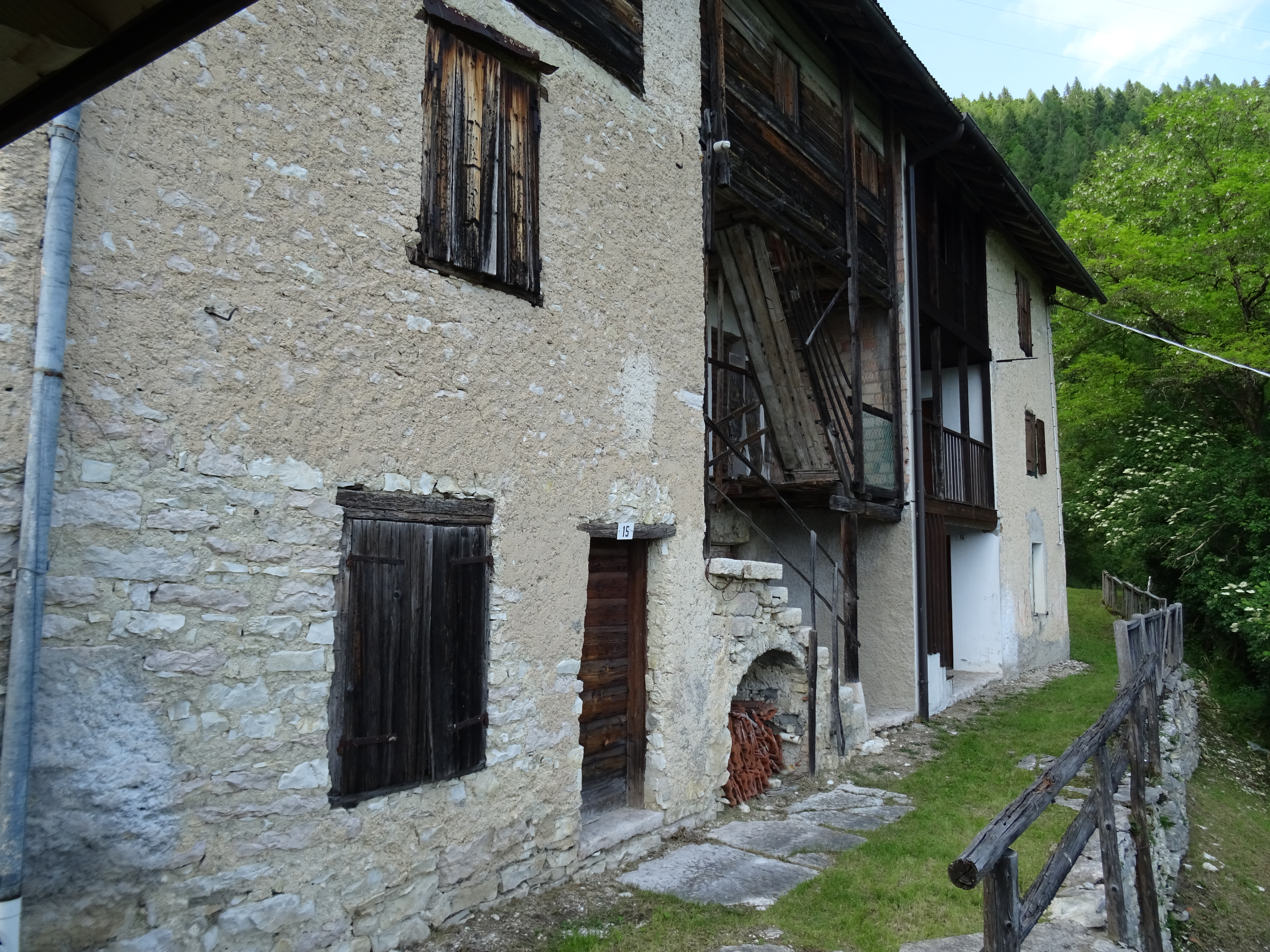
The birth house of Romano Bottegal in Galline, a small hamlet near San Donato (Lamon)

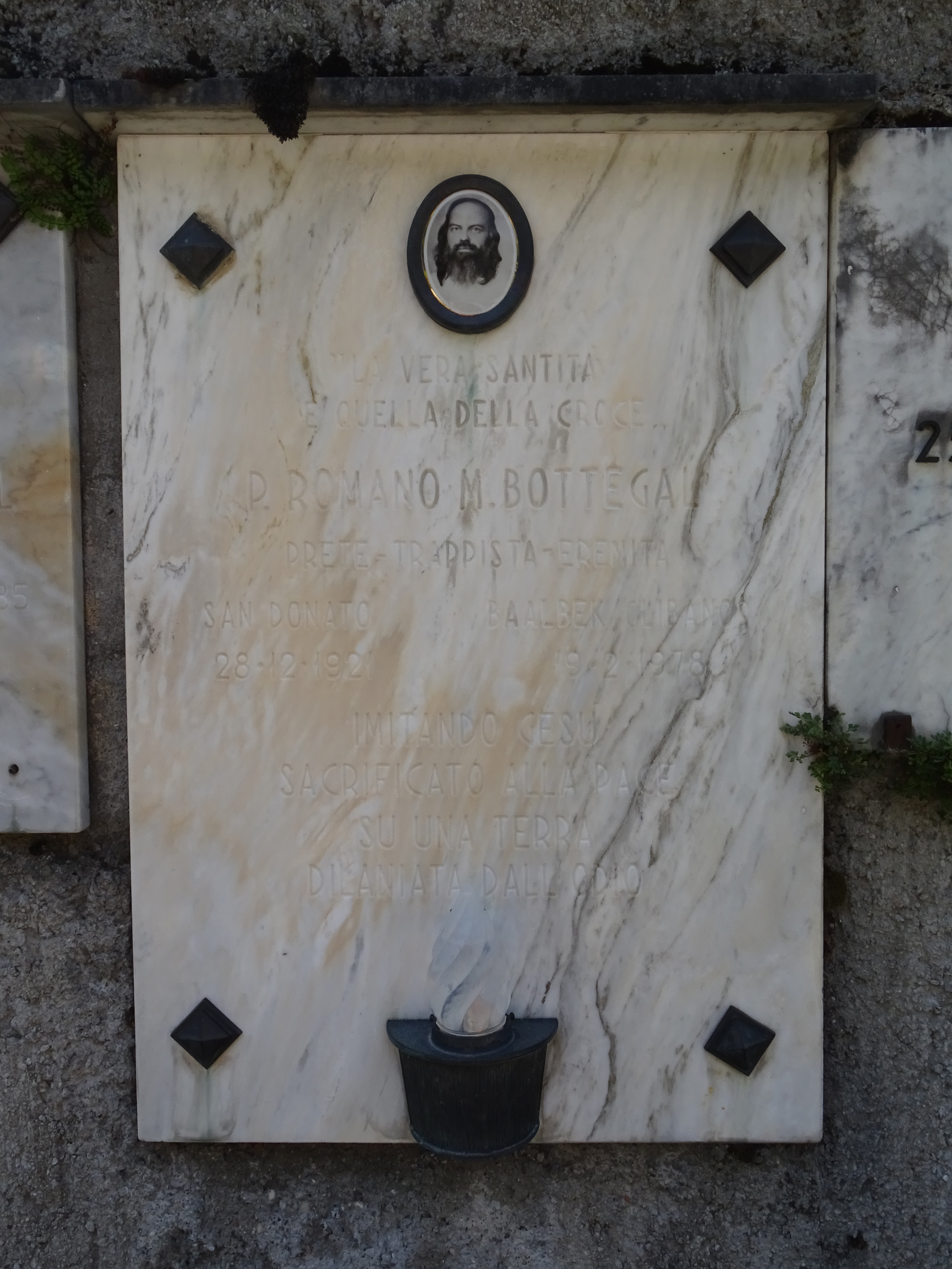
Memorial plaque to father Romano in the cemetery of San Donato (Lamon)

Romano Bottegal was born on 28 December 1921 in San Donato di Lamon in the Belluno province as the last of six children to the poor Romano Bottegal and Emilia Tiziani; his father later emigrated to Australia where two children joined him. He received baptism on 31 December as Romano Donato with the latter name being given in honor of his paternal grandfather. His brother Guido lost his sight at the age of 21 in an accident while working in the mines. He received his Confirmation on 25 June 1927 from the Bishop of Belluno Giosuè Cattarossi.

He did his ecclesial studies first in Feltre (entering on 2 October 1933 with the aid of his parish priest) and then in Belluno from October 1939 where his vice-rector was the future pope Albino Luciani who took a liking to Bottegal. In July 1938 he made a vow to remain chaste for the remainder of his life. He expressed his desire on multiple occasions to enter the monastic life but his superiors advised him to wait until he was ordained before making decisions on pursuing the monastic life.

He received the tonsure on 20 March 1942 and then the minor orders on 18 December 1943 before he was made a subdeacon alongside six others on 1 July 1945. The Bishop of Belluno Girolamo Bartolomeo Bortignon made him a deacon on 22 December 1945.

Bottegal was ordained a priest in Belluno on 29 June 1946 from Bishop Bortignon in the church of San Daniele di Lamon (celebrating his first Mass on 30 June) and then decided to join a monastic order. He entered the Trappists at Tre Fontane in 1946 where he made his temporary vows on 8 September 1948 before making his solemn vows on 8 September 1951.

On 15 June 1953m he received a licentiate in theological studies from the Gregorian where he studied after his ordination. He served as the novice master from 1954 until 1957. In 1961 – at the request of the abbot of Latroun in Israel – he helped to contribute to the founding of a Trappist convent in Lebanon that would follow the Maronite Rite. While in Lebanon, he studied Arabic and Syriac in addition to the liturgies of the Eastern Churches. But the project was abandoned in December 1963 and Bottegal was ordered to return to Rome even though he wished to remain in Lebanon. However, his superior saw his dedication to the monastic life so allowed for him to live in a monastic manner at Tre Fontane; the superior's successor in 1964 permitted him to go to live as a hermit in Lebanon since he found it was not feasible for Bottegal to live the monastic life at Tre Fontane in the manner he wished. He was granted a canonical indult - Ad ducendam vitam eremiticam - that lasted from 1964 until 1967 and in between was granted the indult for perpetual exclaustration - Ad nutum Sanctae Sedis - in 1966. Bottegal began living as a hermit from 1969 until 1973 in both Israel and Lebanon and then from 1976 began living as a recluse until his death. From 1964 onwards he lived in Jabbouleh in Lebanon (without furniture or heating) and was under the direct supervision of the Melkite Bishop of Baalbek Joseph Malouff.

Bottegal died due to tuberculosis on 19 February 1978 in a hospital in Beirut; his remains are interred at the Saint Barbara Cathedral in Baalbek.

== Beatification process ==
The beatification process started on 23 August 2000 after the forum for the cause to be conducted was transferred from the Melkite diocese Beirut-Byblos to the Melkite archdiocese Baalbek. The Congregation for the Causes of Saints titled Bottegal as a Servant of God on 22 September 2000, after issuing the nihil obstat decree that allowed for the cause to open. The diocesan process was conducted from 10 June 2001 until 10 March 2002 at which stage the cause was taken to Rome where the Congregation validated the cause on 30 May 2003 as having complied with their regulations for conducting causes. The Congregation received the positio dossier in 2005 for assessment. Bottegal was declared venerable on 9 December 2013. The postulator for the cause is the Gabriella Masturzo OCSO.
