= Gregorio Cortese =

Italian cardinal and monastic reformer (1483-1548)

Gregorio Cortese, born Giovanni Andrea Cortese (1483 – 21 September 1548) was an Italian cardinal and monastic reformer.

== Life ==
Cortese was born in Modena. After receiving a training in the humanities at Modena under the Cistercian Varino of Piacenza, he devoted himself to the study of jurisprudence for five years, first at Bologna, then at Padua, and graduated as doctor of laws at the early age of seventeen. His thorough knowledge of the Latin and Greek languages induced Cardinal Giovanni de' Medici, the future Pope Leo X, to take him into his service and afterwards appoint him legal auditor in the Papal Curia. Desirous of leading a quieter life, Cortese resigned this office and in 1507 entered the Benedictine monastery of Polirone near Mantua, one of the most flourishing abbeys of the recently founded Cassinese Congregation. There, he took the name Gregorio.

When de' Medici heard that his former auditor had become a monk, he addressed a letter to him expressing his surprise and his displeasure at the step which Cortese had taken and urging him to leave the monastery and resume his former occupation in Rome. In his answer to the cardinal's letter, Cortese states that great dangers beset his soul when he was still engaged in worldly pursuits, and speaks of the interior happiness which he experienced while chanting the Divine praises and applying himself to the study of Holy Scripture. When in 1513 de' Medici ascended the papal throne as Leo X, Cortese sent him a letter of congratulation in which, however, he did not omit to remind the new pontiff of his duty to begin at last general reform of the Church. Cortese was deeply grieved at what he saw as the indifference manifested by many ecclesiastical dignitaries towards a wholesome internal reform of the Christian Church. It is due to him that the Benedictine reform, which had recently been inaugurated in Italy by the Cassinese Congregation, was carried through, and that, with the return of monastic discipline, the Benedictine monasteries of Italy again became seats of that learning for which they had been so famous in the past.

In 1516, Augustin de Grimaldi, Bishop of Grasse and abbot of Lérins Abbey, united his monastery with the Cassinese Congregation, and, upon the bishop's request, Cortese and a few others were sent thither to assist in introducing the Cassinese reform. Here, Cortese devoted himself to literary pursuits, and in order to promote the study of the Humanities, he founded an academy where he and other learned members of the monastery educated the French youth, thus becoming instrumental in transplanting to French soil the literary Humanistic movement. In 1524, Cortese was elected abbot of Lerins. His health, however, was greatly impaired during his sojourn there, so that in 1527 he considered a change of climate indispensable and asked the superior of the congregation for permission to return to Italy. As a result, he was appointed Abbot of St. Peter's at Modena; a year later, Abbot of St. Peter's in Perugia; and in 1537 Abbot of the San Giorgio Monastery in Venice.

Cortese was now considered one of the most learned men in Italy and had regular correspondence with the greatest scholars in Europe. He counted among his friends Gasparo Contarini, Reginald Pole, Jacopo Sadoleto, Pietro Bembo, Gian Matteo Giberti, and many other Humanists and ecclesiastical dignitaries. He served with several of these on the Consilium de Emendanda Ecclesia.

The garden of San Giorgio was the place where discussions were held, to which the Florentine scholar Brucciolo refers in his dialogues on moral philosophy. In 1536 Pope Paul III made him a member of the committee of nine ecclesiastics who were to draw up a statement of those ecclesiastical abuses which called most loudly for reform. Soon after, he was appointed Apostolic visitor for the whole of Italy and, somewhat later, was sent to Germany to take part in the theological disputation at Worms in 1540, but became sick on the journey and was obliged to remain in Italy. Meanwhile, (1538) he became Abbot of San Benedetto in Polirone, then the most important monastery of the Cassinese Congregation. A few times, moreover, he was chosen visitor general of his congregation. Finally, on 2 June 1542, Paul III created him cardinal-priest and appointed him a member of the committee of cardinals for the preparation of the Council of Trent. Towards the end of the same year, he became Bishop of Urbino. During the five years of his cardinalate, he was an esteemed friend and adviser of Paul III and used all his influence to bring about reform of the Church.

== Works ==
Cortese was one of the best-known writers of his time. Cardinal Bembo and others did not hesitate to class him among the most elegant Latin writers of the period. His principal works are epistles, poems, a treatise proving that St. Peter was in Rome, a Latin translation of the New Testament from the Greek texts, a historical work on the destruction of Genoa, etc. All his extant works were collected and edited with a biography of the author by the Benedictine Bishop Gradenigo of Ceneda in two volumes (Padua, 1774).
