= Gianfrancesco Bembo =

Gianfrancesco Bembo may refer to:

- Giovanni Francesco Bembo (fl. 1515–1543), Italian Renaissance painter
- Gianfrancesco Bembo (bishop) (1659–1720), Roman Catholic prelate
