= Alfredo Battisti =

Italian Roman Catholic archbishop

His Excellency, The Most Reverend, Mons. Alfredo Battisti
- Metropolitan Archbishop of Udine
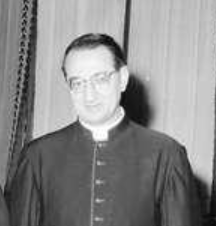
- Mons. Alfredo Battisti
- Church: Catholic Church
- Archdiocese: Udine
- Appointed: 13 December 1972
- Predecessor: Giuseppe Zaffonato
- Successor: Pietro Brollo

Orders
- Ordination: 20 September 1947 by Bishop Carlo Agostini
- Consecration: 25 February 1973 by Girolamo Bortignon

Personal details
- Born: 17 January 1925; Masi
- Died: 1 January 2012 (aged 86); Udine

Alfredo Battisi (17 January 1925 – 1 January 2012) was the Catholic archbishop of the Archdiocese of Udine, Italy.

Ordained to the priesthood in 1947, Battisi became archbishop in 1972 and retired in 2000.
