= Daniel II =

Daniel II may refer to:

- Saint Danilo II, Archbishop of Serbs from 1324 to 1337
- Daniel II of Antioch, see List of Maronite Patriarchs
- Daniel II of Armenia, see List of Catholicoi of Armenia
- Daniel II of Prague, see List of bishops and archbishops of Prague
- Daniel II of Terremonde, see Vassals of the Kingdom of Jerusalem
- Daniel II Cardinal Dolfino, Patriarch of Aquileia and Archbishop of Udine
- Danilo I, Prince of Montenegro (1826–1860), known once as bishop Danilo II

== See also ==
- Daniel 2
