= Lamba (surname) =

South asian surname

Lamba‌, also spelt Lanba, is a surname. Notable people with the surname include:

- Abhimanyu Lamba (born 1995), Indian cricketer
- Ajai Lamba (born 1958), Indian judge
- Alka Lamba (born 1975), Indian politician
- Ankit Lamba (born 1991), Indian cricketer
- Arfi Lamba, Indian-born actor, producer, entertainer, philosopher, and humanist
- Aryan Niraj Lamba (born 2002), Indian footballer
- Chhaju Ram Lamba (1861–1943), Indian businessman and philanthropist
- Dinesh Lamba, Indian actor
- Indrajit Lamba (born 1949), Indian equestrian
- Jacqueline Lamba (1910–1993), French artist
- Minissha Lamba (born 1985), Indian actress
- Priti Lamba (born 1995), Indian track athlete
- Raman Lamba (1960–1998), Indian cricketer
- Ramswaroop Lamba, Indian politician
- Riccardo Lamba (born 1956), Catholic Priest of Italy
- Sonam Lamba (born 1997), Indian actress
- Sunil Lamba (born 1957), former Indian Navy Chief
- Vinay Lamba, Indian cricketer
