= Vincenzo Savio =

Italian Salesian bishop

Bishop Vincenzo Savio SDB
- Bishop of Belluno-Feltre
- Church: Roman Catholic Church
- Diocese: Belluno-Feltre
- See: Belluno-Feltre
- Appointed: 9 December 2000
- Installed: 18 February 2001
- Term ended: 31 March 2004
- Predecessor: Pietro Brollo
- Successor: Giuseppe Andrich
- Previous posts: Auxiliary Bishop of Livorno (1993–2000); Titular Bishop of Garriana (1993–2000)

Orders
- Ordination: 25 March 1972
- Consecration: 30 May 1993 by Alberto Ablondi
- Rank: Bishop

Personal details
- Born: Vincenzo Savio; 6 April 1944 Osio Sotto, Bergamo, Italy
- Died: 31 March 2004 (aged 59) Belluno, Italy
- Motto: Veritas in caritate ("Truth in love")
- Coat of arms

Vincenzo Savio, SDB, (6 April 1944 – 31 March 2004) was an Italian Salesian who served as the Bishop of Belluno-Feltre.

Hailed as a pious and spiritual pastor, there have been calls for his beatification.

== Life ==
Vincenzo Savio was born in Osio Sotto on 6 April 1944 to Augustus Savio and Santina Arnoldi as the sixth of seven children. He was an intellectual and his talents melded with his religious vocation led him to commence his studies for the priesthood on 26 September 1955.

He was admitted to the novitiate of the Salesians of Don Bosco and made his religious profession on 16 August 1961. He took his perpetual vows in 1967. He also completed his philosophical studies and obtained a diploma in science. He undertook theological courses in Rome and obtained a licentiate in 1972 as a result of his theological studies.

He was ordained to the priesthood in Rome on 25 March 1972. He served as a parish priest in Livorno from 1977 to 1985 and he collaborated when it came to episcopal conferences in Livorno. He would return to Rome in 1985 to present a thesis but decided to reject the academic career he once held in high esteem. In 1990 he was made the governor of the Salesian Provincial Chapter.

Pope John Paul II appointed him as the Titular Bishop of Garrisana on 14 April 1993 and also appointed him to a post in Livorno. He received episcopal consecration in 1993 before he embarked for Livorno.

John Paul II later appointed him as the Bishop of Belluno-Feltre on 9 December 2000. He was installed several weeks later and dedicated his first moments to the sick. On 26 August 2001 he celebrated mass for the pontifical election of the late Pope John Paul I – who reigned a mere month in 1978 – and also celebrated mass on 28 September for the late pope.

Savio visited Brazil in mid 2001 and undertook a pilgrimage to Lourdes in September. On 18 October 2001 he read a papal document that saw a church raised to the rank of Minor Basilica. In 2003 he began to assemble documentation for the cause of canonization of Pope John Paul I – the cause was opened on 23 November 2003.

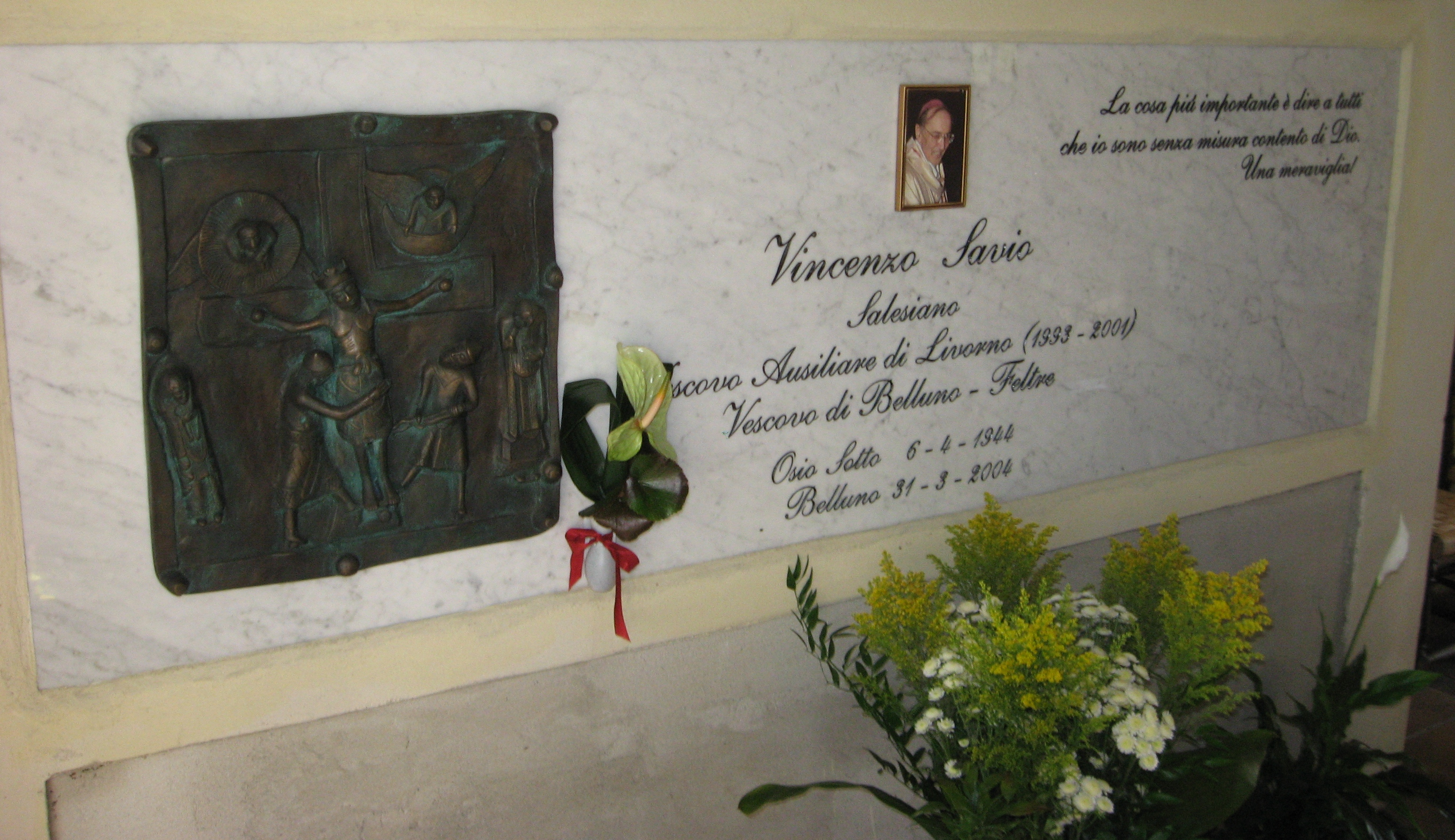
Vincenzo Savio's tomb

His health started to decline at a rapid pace around Christmas in 2003 and was operated on at the beginning of 2004. He was admitted to hospital in March 2004 and he received the last rites on 27 March.

Vincenzo Savio died on 31 March 2004 at 8:42am with his sisters and niece at his bedside. There had been calls for a beatification process for Savio.
