= Bernardo de' Rossi =

Italian bishop and patron of the arts

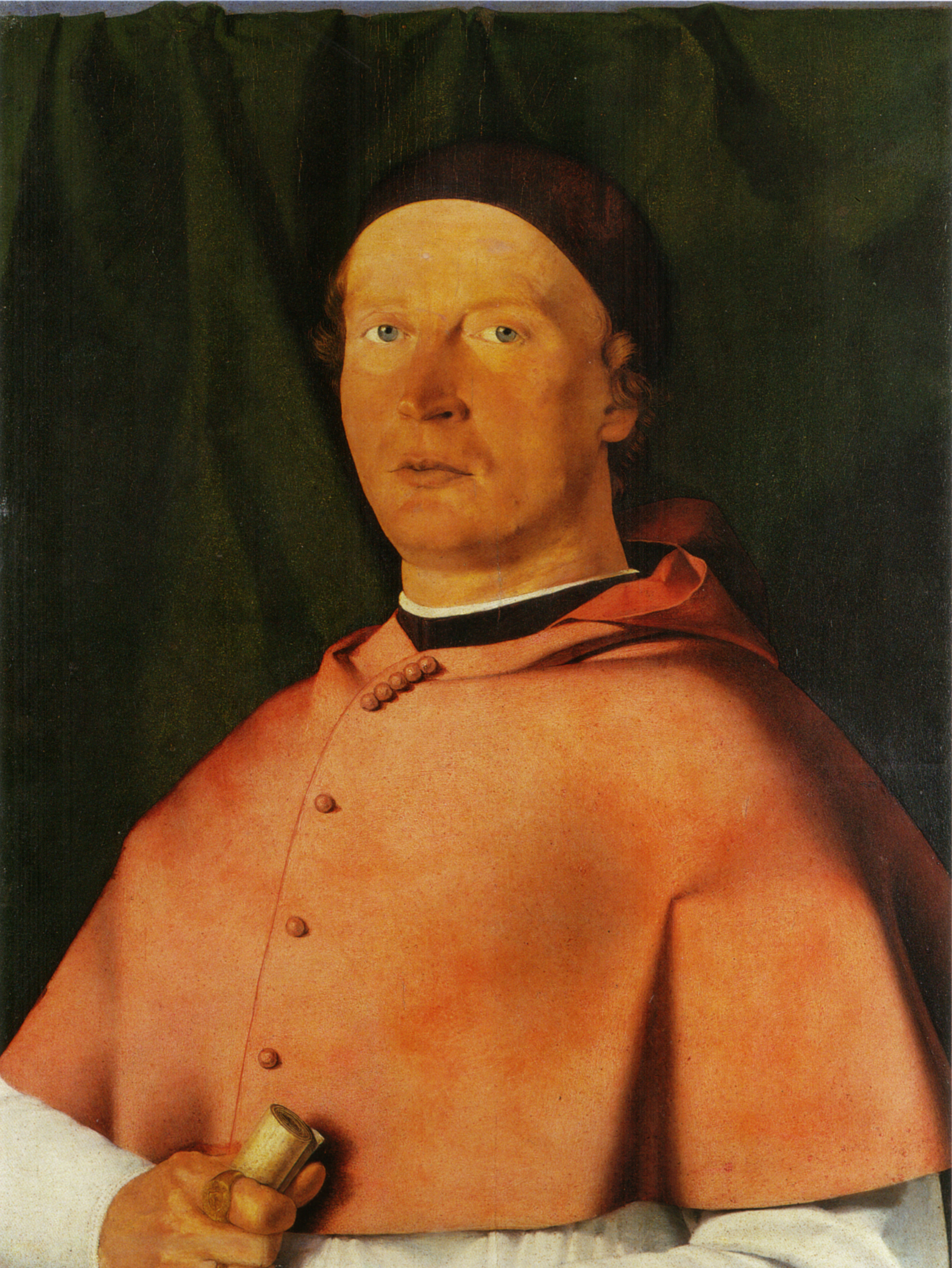
Portrait of Bishop Bernardo de' Rossi by Lorenzo Lotto. Museo di Capodimonte, Naples.

Bernardo de' Rossi (26 August 1468 – 28 June 1527) was an Italian bishop and patron of the arts.

== Biography ==
Rossi was the son of a feudal family from the area of Parma; at a young age, he received the archdeaconate of Padua and the Abbey of St. Crisogonus in Zadar. On 4 Apr 1487, thanks to the support of the Republic of Venice, he was appointed Bishop of Belluno. On 16 Aug 1499, he was appointed as bishop of Treviso. Here he held a small court, featuring artists such as Lorenzo Lotto, who painted a portrait of him around 1505.

In 1503, de' Rossi entered into conflict with the Venetian podestà of Treviso, Girolamo Contarini. In September of that year, a plot set against him by the Onigo family failed as it was discovered before its execution.

In 1509, after further controversies with the Venetian authorities, he was forced to leave the diocese and moved to Rome (1510). In 1522, he returned to the ancestral field of San Secondo Parmense, fighting against members of his family. He eventually clashed with the condottiero Giovanni dalle Bande Nere, who had come to help his sister-in-law Bianca Riario, the wife of Troilo I de' Rossi. Bernardo de' Rossi fled to Parma in 1524, and died a few years later, perhaps poisoned by his nephews Giovan Girlamo and Bertrando.

While bishop, he was the principal consecrator of Paride de Grassis, Bishop of Pesaro (1513).

== External links and additional sources ==
- Page on Bernardo de' Rossi (in Italian)
- Cheney, David M. "Diocese of Belluno-Feltre". Catholic-Hierarchy.org. (for Chronology of Bishops) ^{[self-published]}
- Chow, Gabriel. "Diocese of Belluno-Feltre (Italy)". GCatholic.org. (for Chronology of Bishops) ^{[self-published]}
- Cheney, David M. "Diocese of Treviso". Catholic-Hierarchy.org. (for Chronology of Bishops) ^{[self-published]}
- Chow, Gabriel. "Diocese of Treviso (Italy)". GCatholic.org. (for Chronology of Bishops) ^{[self-published]}

Catholic Church titles
Preceded by Pietro Barozzi	Bishop of Belluno; 1488–1499	Succeeded by Bartolomeo Trevisan
Preceded by Niccolò Franco	Bishop of Treviso; 1499–1527	Succeeded by Francesco Pisani
