= Pietro Barozzi =

Italian Catholic and humanist bishop

Most Reverend Pietro Barozzi
- Bishop of Padua
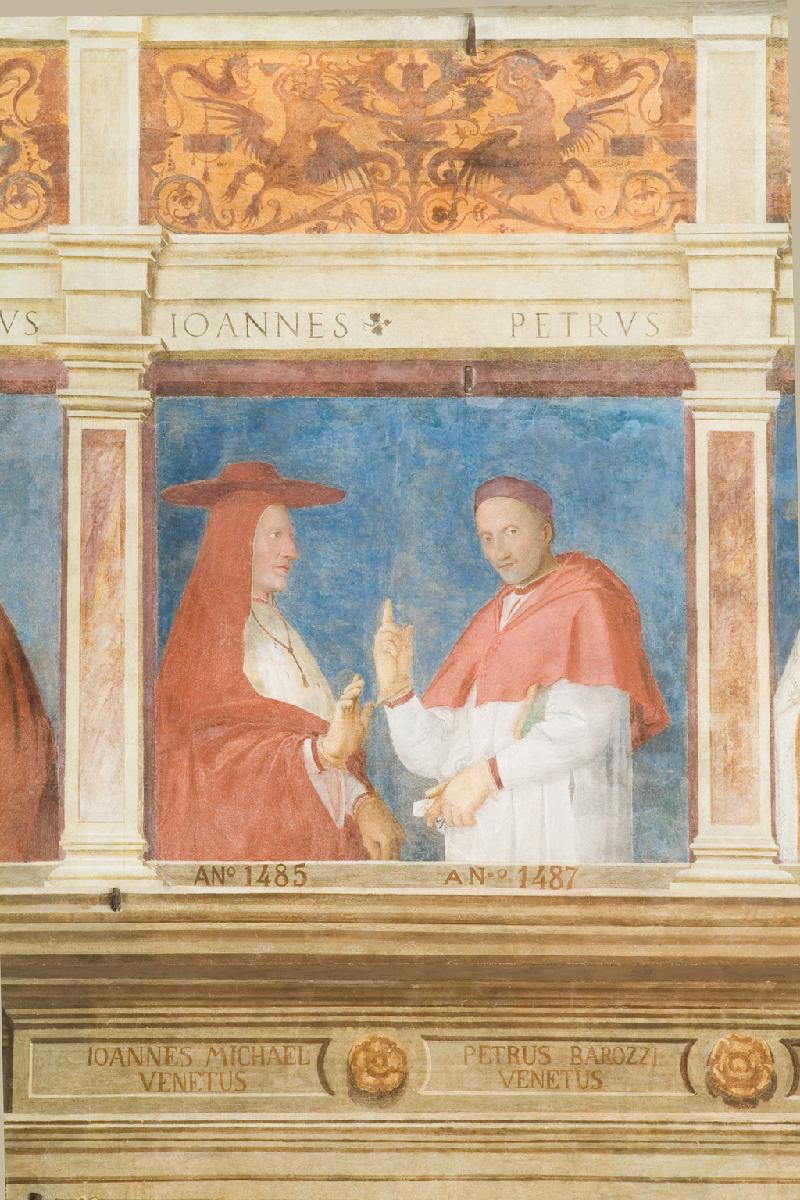
- Bartolomeo Montagna, Portraits of bishop Giovanni Battista Michiel (left) and bishop Pietro Barozzi (right), Padua
- Church: Catholic Church
- Predecessor: Hieronymus Landus
- Successor: Sisto Gara della Rovere
- Previous post: Bishop of Belluno (1471 - 1487)

Orders
- Consecration: 1471 by Pope Paul II

Personal details
- Born: 1441 Venice, Italy
- Died: 10 January 1507 (aged 65–66) Padua, Italy

Pietro Barozzi (1441 - 1507) was an Italian Catholic and humanist bishop.

== Biography ==
Son of the senator Ludovico Barozzi, he was born in Venice, but little is known about his life before 1480. He was a nephew of Pope Paul II.

Barozzi began to study Latin and Greek letters with his companions Pietro Delfino and Leonardo Loredan, all pupils of the master Pierleone Leoni. He then studied at the University of Padua from 1461 to 1471, where he graduated in jurisprudence. His interests included humanistic studies, mathematics, Platonic studies, and theology. In 1471 he was Bishop of Belluno and in 1487 Bishop of Padua.

He devoted particular attention to architectural studies, which he put into practice in rearranging and decorating public and ecclesiastical structures, influenced by the style of Alberti. Among his works was the frescoed chapel of Santa Maria degli Angeli. It is in Padua in the Museo Diocesano, the former bishop's palace, which Barozzi transformed into a magnificent Renaissance showplace. In 1506 he commissioned Bartolomeo Montagna to paint portraits of one hundred bishops of Padua in the Salone there.

Barozzi was a follower of the reform movement started by Patriarch of Venice Lorenzo Giustiniani, which included bringing bishops more in contact with the people. Barozzi opposed the views of Pietro Pomponazzi and believed “Christian Philosophy” could be used to theologically and philosophically demonstrate the immortality of the soul. As Bishop, Barozzi was dedicated and made point of visiting all the districts in his diocese. Barozzi personally led mass every morning instead of leaving this duty to the friars. He called frequennt synods, and worked to educate the clergy of his diocese. He believed monastic rules should be learned in the vernacular, emphasized the importance of monastic libraries and clerical residency, and opposed popular superstitions. In 1491, in an attempt to help the poor, he established a Monte di Pietà, which could be used for small loans.

In 1488, he prohibited the veneration of Lorenzo da Marostica, because it had not been approved by the Vatican. He also did not allow a church in Padua to be named after Rocco, a popular saint who had not been canonized.

In 1489, Barozzi and the Inquisitor of Padua threatened to excommunicate anyone at the University of Padua who publicly debated the Averroist belief in the unity of the intellect. Copies of the edict were posted on doors of the Cathedral of Padua and the Basilica of Sant'Antonio. Nicoletto Vernia saw himself as a target of the edict, wrote a treatise in 1492 against the Averroist view he had previously supported, and included his correspondence with Barozzi in the book.

When Charles VIII of France tried to seize the throne of Naples in 1494, Barozzi was one of several Italian clergymen who saw this as God’s punishment for the sins of the Italian people.

In 1495, Barozzi began the remodelling of the episcopal palace in Padua, hiring architect Lorenzo da Bologna to construct of the chapel of Santa Maria degli Angeli. Following specific instructions from Barozzi, Prospero da Piazzola and Jacopo Parisati of Montagnana created the palace's frescoes. Parisati also created the triptych of the Annunciation which adorned the altar. Pietro Barozzi died in Padua in 1507.

On his initiative, the Monte di Pietà was established in Padua.

Between 1500 and 1506 he was the chancellor of the University of Padua.

== Writings ==
While Barozzi was Bishop of Belluno, he wrote about the life of St. Martin. Later, he translated a life of Basil by an unknown author. Sometime between 1470 and 1480, while he was in Bergamo, Barozzi wrote De factionibus extinguendis, which condemned the conflict between the Guelphs and the Ghibellines. In 1480 we wrote De modo bene moriendi, a treatise on the proper way for Christians to deal with death. He also wrote poetry and political theory.

== Legacy ==
In 1490, publisher Aldus Manutius specifically praised Bishop Barozzi for his skill in geometry, Latin, and the law; which Manutius considered exceeded Barozzi’s skill as a bishop.

In 1517, reformer Gasparo Contarini wrote a treatise, ‘’De officio episcopi’’, which used Barozzi as the example of an ideal bishop.

In recent times he is considered influential in humanism, and Hubert Jedin describes him as an exemplary bishop.

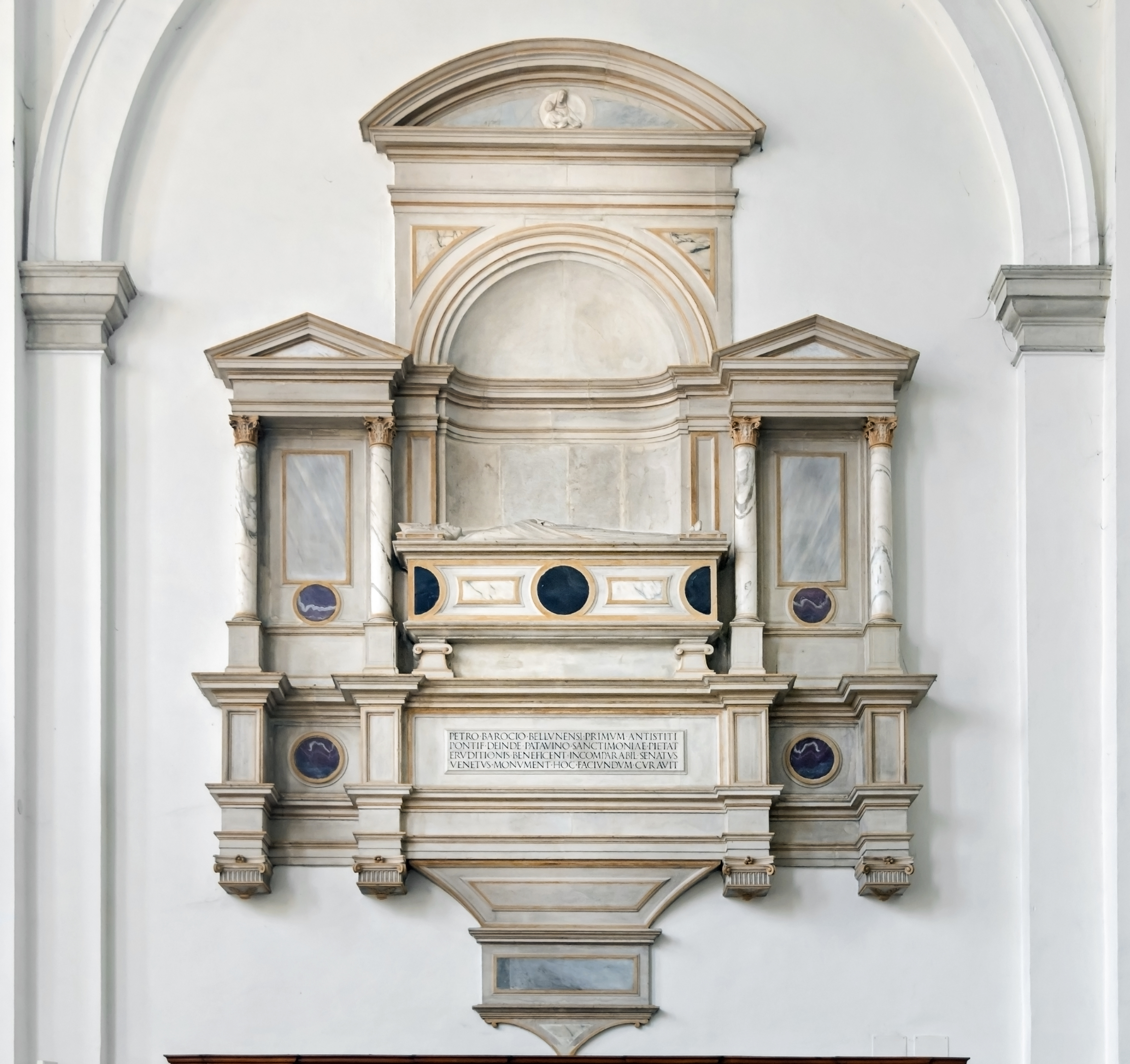
Padua Cathedral, Bishop Pietro Barozzi's tomb

He died in 1507. The erudite bishop Pietro Barozzi left a large collection of books: juridical, theological works, of Greek, Latin and vernacular classics and humanist authors. Some of his manuscripts are now in England.

== Sources ==
- Varanini, Gian Maria (2015-04-17). Itinerario per la Terraferma veneziana (in Italian). Viella Libreria Editrice. p. 531. ISBN 978-88-6728-369-9.
- King, Margaret L. (2009-05-15). The Death of the Child Valerio Marcello. University of Chicago Press. p. 26. ISBN 978-0-226-43627-2.
- Mixson, James; Roest, Bert (2015-06-02). A Companion to Observant Reform in the Late Middle Ages and Beyond. BRILL. p. 33. ISBN 978-90-04-29752-4.
- Arfanotti, Elisabetta (2004–2005). Un cultore dell'Alberti: Pietro Barozzi (2-3ª ed.). Moderni e Antichi.
- Archivum Historiae Pontificiae. Vol. 17. See also Pietroantonio Gios, L'attività pastorale del vescovo Pietro Barozzi a Padova (1407-1507) Istituto per la Storia Ecclesiastica Padovana, 1977. Gregorian Biblical BookShop. p. 467.
- Tiraboschi, Girolamo (1781). Storia della letteratura italiana dell' abate Girolamo Tiraboschi,... Tomo primo [ - Tomo decimo] (Vol 6 ed.). Muccis. p. 169.
- Mitsis, Phillip (2020). Oxford Handbook of Epicurus and Epicureanism Oxford Handbooks. Oxford University Press. p. 623. ISBN 9780197521991.
- Scipione, Francesco; Dondi-Orologio, Marchese (1805). Serie cronologico-istorica dei canonici di Padova. Stamp: del Seminario. p. 218.
