= Consilium de Emendanda Ecclesia =

1536 report commissioned by Pope Paul III

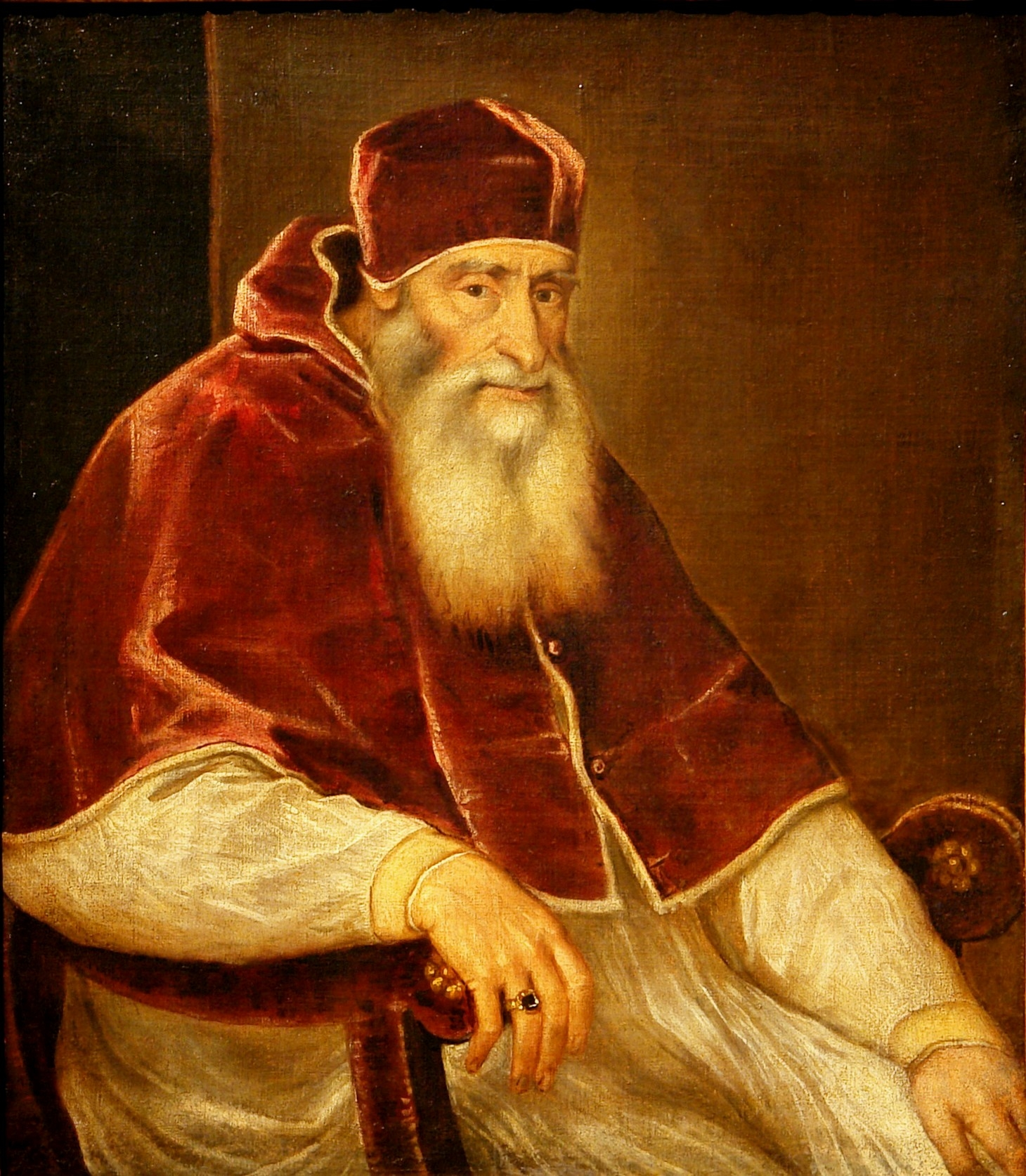
Pope Paul III created a commission to analyze abuses within the Church and propose reforms. The commission's findings were published in the document Consilium de emendanda Ecclesia.

The Consilium de Emendanda Ecclesia was a report commissioned by Pope Paul III on the abuses in the Catholic Church in 1536.

The commission appointed to review the abuses in the church was presided over by Gasparo Cardinal Contarini and consisted of eight additional cardinals: Girolamo Aleandro, Tommaso Badia, Giovanni Pietro Carafa (the later Pope Paul IV), Gregorio Cortese, Federigo Fregoso, Gianmatteo Giberti, Reginald Pole, and Jacopo Sadoleto. Their finished report was read to Paul III on 9 March 1537. It dealt mainly with the fiscal abuses of the papacy, the dangers of simony, and the need for laws not to be dispensed with by papal fiat.

Paul III accepted the recommendations but did not commit himself to any immediate changes. The confidential report was published illegally in 1538 and enjoyed a wide circulation. Martin Luther published a German version, completed with sarcastic side margins. Johannes Sturm approached the Consilium more seriously, applauding the effort made by the Catholic Church to abolish some of its most pressing abuses, but showing great concern whether the church could revitalize itself without giving greater importance to the Gospel.

The Consilium de emendanda ecclesia was never put into effect, although many of the proposed changes were implemented in later reforms.
