= Giovanni Battista Casale =

Most Reverend Giovanni Battista Casale
- Bishop of Belluno
- Church: Catholic Church
- Diocese: Diocese of Belluno
- In office: 1527–1536
- Predecessor: Galeso Nichesola
- Successor: Gasparo Contarini

Personal details
- Died: Sep 1536 Belluno, Italy

Giovanni Battista Casale (died 1536) was a Roman Catholic prelate who served as Bishop of Belluno (1527–1536).

== Biography ==
On 18 September 1527, Giovanni Battista Casale was appointed during the papacy of Pope Clement VII as Bishop of Belluno. He served as Bishop of Belluno until his death in Sep 1536.

== External links and additional sources ==
- Cheney, David M. "Diocese of Belluno-Feltre". Catholic-Hierarchy.org. (for Chronology of Bishops) ^{[self-published]}
- Chow, Gabriel. "Diocese of Belluno-Feltre (Italy)". GCatholic.org. (for Chronology of Bishops) ^{[self-published]}

Catholic Church titles
Preceded by Galeso Nichesola	Bishop of Belluno; 1527–1536	Succeeded by Gasparo Contarini
