= Bartolomeo Trevisan =

Most Reverend Bartolomeo Trevisan
- Bishop of Belluno
- Church: Catholic Church
- Diocese: Diocese of Belluno
- In office: 1499–1509
- Predecessor: Bernardo de' Rossi
- Successor: Galeso Nichesola

Personal details
- Died: 4 September 1509 Belluno, Italy

Bartolomeo Trevisan (died 1509) was a Roman Catholic prelate who served as Bishop of Belluno (1499–1509).

On 26 August 1499, Bartolomeo Trevisan was appointed during the papacy of Pope Alexander VI as Bishop of Belluno. He served as Bishop of Belluno until his death on 4 September 1509.

== External links and additional sources ==
- Cheney, David M. "Diocese of Belluno-Feltre". Catholic-Hierarchy.org. (for Chronology of Bishops) ^{[self-published]}
- Chow, Gabriel. "Diocese of Belluno-Feltre (Italy)". GCatholic.org. (for Chronology of Bishops) ^{[self-published]}

Catholic Church titles
Preceded by Bernardo de' Rossi	Bishop of Belluno; 1499–1509	Succeeded by Galeso Nichesola
