= Andrea Bruno Mazzocato =

Italian Roman Catholic prelate (born 1948)

The Most Reverend Andrea Bruno Mazzocato
- Metropolitan Archbishop Emeritus of Udine
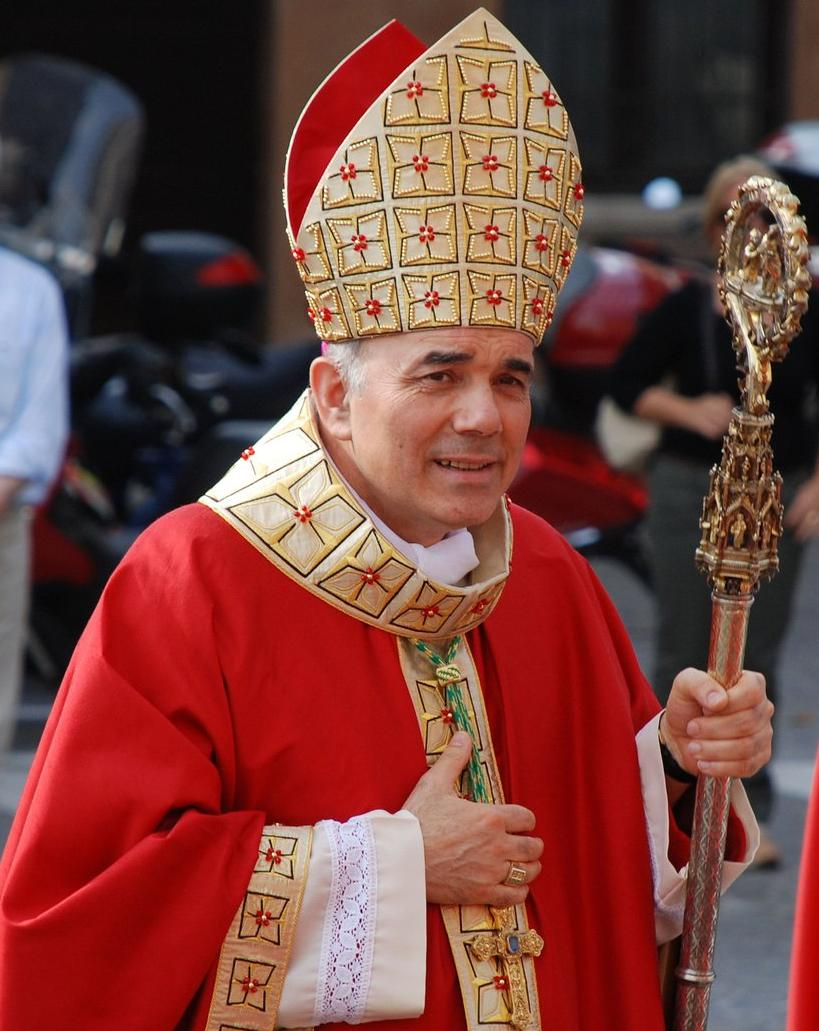
- Mazzocato in Treviso.
- Church: Catholic Church
- Archdiocese: Udine
- See: Udine
- Appointed: 20 August 2009
- Installed: 18 October 2009
- Term ended: 23 February 2024
- Predecessor: Pietro Brollo
- Successor: Riccardo Lamba
- Previous posts: Bishop of Adria-Rovigo (2000-03); Bishop of Treviso (2003-09)

Orders
- Ordination: 3 September 1972 by Antonio Mistrorigo
- Consecration: 9 December 2000 by Paolo Magnani

Personal details
- Born: Andrea Bruno Mazzocato; 1 September 1948 (age 78) San Trovaso, Treviso, Italy
- Motto: Pro vobis in Christo ministri
- Coat of arms

Andrea Bruno Mazzocato (born 1 September 1948 in San Trovaso) is an Italian Catholic prelate. He was ordained to the priesthood in 1972. From 2000 to 2003 he was bishop of Adria-Rovigo and from 2003 until 2009 served as the Bishop of Treviso. In 2009, Mazzocato became the Archbishop of Udine.
