= Galeso Nichesola =

Most Reverend Galeso Nichesola
- Bishop of Belluno
- Church: Catholic Church
- Diocese: Diocese of Belluno
- In office: 1509–1527
- Predecessor: Bartolomeo Trevisan
- Successor: Giovanni Battista Casale

Personal details
- Died: 2 August 1527 Belluno, Italy

Galeso Nichesola (died 1527) was a Roman Catholic prelate who served as Bishop of Belluno (1509–1527).

== Biography ==
On 19 Sep 1509, Galeso Nichesola was appointed during the papacy of Pope Julius II as Bishop of Belluno. He served as Bishop of Belluno until his death on 2 Aug 1527.

== External links and additional sources ==
- Cheney, David M. "Diocese of Belluno-Feltre". Catholic-Hierarchy.org. (for Chronology of Bishops) ^{[self-published]}
- Chow, Gabriel. "Diocese of Belluno-Feltre (Italy)". GCatholic.org. (for Chronology of Bishops) ^{[self-published]}

Catholic Church titles
Preceded by Bartolomeo Trevisan	Bishop of Belluno; 1509–1527	Succeeded by Giovanni Battista Casale
