= Giosuè Cattarossi =

Italian cleric

The Most Reverend Giosuè Cattarossi
- Bishop of Belluno e Feltre
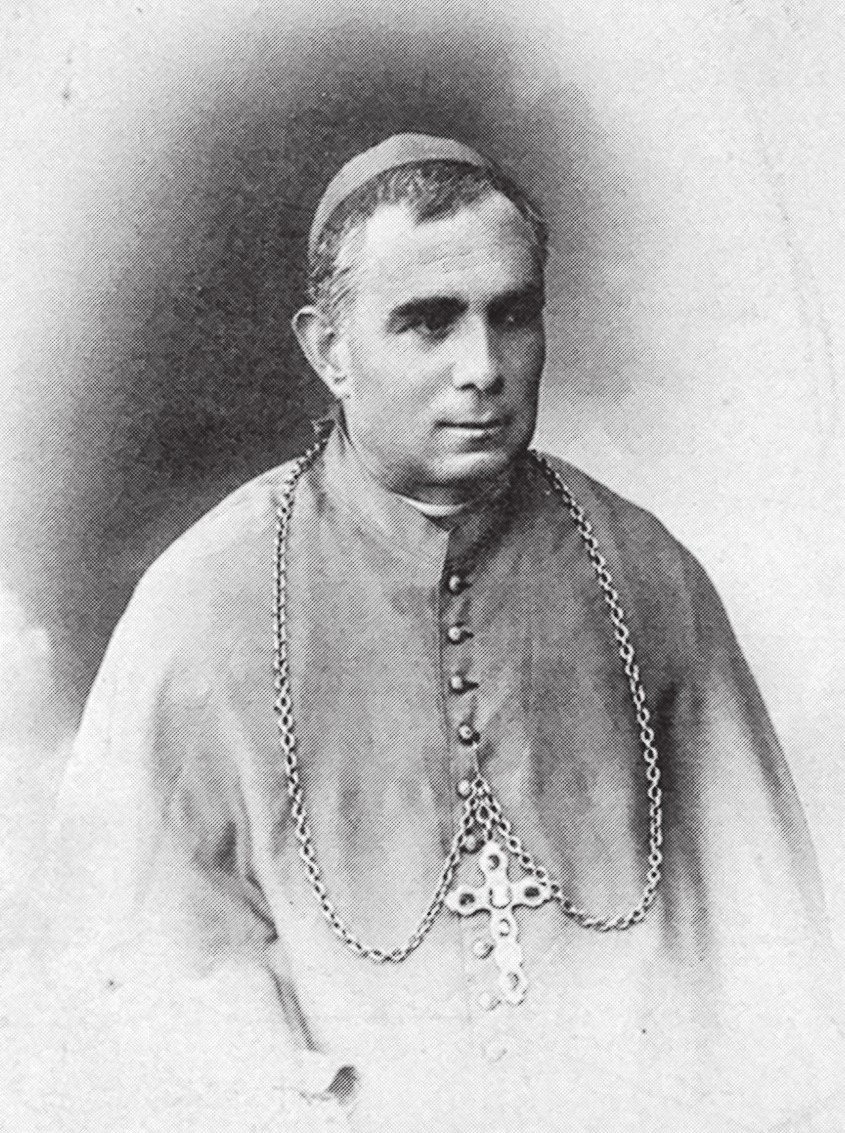
- Bishop Cattarossi in 1911.
- Church: Roman Catholic Church
- Diocese: Belluno e Feltre
- See: Belluno e Feltre
- Appointed: 21 November 1913
- Installed: 26 July 1914
- Term ended: 3 March 1944
- Predecessor: Giuseppe Foschiani
- Successor: Girolamo Bartolomeo Bortignon
- Previous post(s): Bishop of Albenga (1911-13)

Orders
- Ordination: 31 March 1888
- Consecration: 28 May 1911 by Antonio Anastasio Rossi

Personal details
- Born: Giosuè Cattarossi; 23 April 1863; Cortale, Reana del Rojale, Udine, Kingdom of Italy
- Died: 3 March 1944 (aged 80); Belluno, Kingdom of Italy
- Buried: Belluno Cathedral
- Motto: In Christo virescit
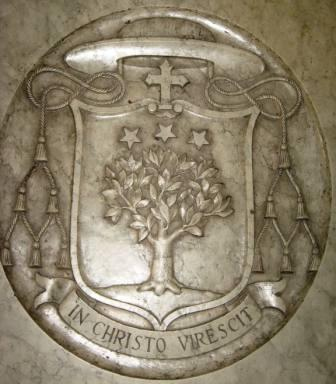
- Coat of arms

Giosuè Cattarossi (23 April 1863 – 3 March 1944) was a late 19th century/early-mid 20th century Italian cleric. Born 23 April 1863 at Cortale, he was ordained a priest in April 1888, aged 24. On 11 April 1911 at the age of 48, he was appointed as Bishop of Albenga and ordained on 30 May of that year.

On 21 November 1913 at age 50, he was appointed as Bishop of Belluno e Feltre, Italy. As bishop, he ordained Albino Luciani, the future Pope John Paul I, to the priesthood in 1935. He died in 1944, aged 80, as Bishop of Belluno e Feltre. In total, he was a priest for 55 years and a bishop for 32 years.
