= Pietro Brollo =

Italian Roman Catholic bishop (1933–2019)

The Most Reverend Pietro Brollo
- Archbishop of Udine
- Church: Roman Catholic Church
- Archdiocese: Udine
- See: Udine
- Appointed: 28 October 2000
- Installed: 7 January 2001
- Term ended: 20 August 2009
- Predecessor: Alfredo Battisti
- Successor: Andrea Bruno Mazzocato
- Previous post(s): Auxiliary Bishop of Udine (1985-95); Bishop of Belluno-Feltre (1995-2000)

Orders
- Ordination: 17 March 1957 by Giuseppe Zaffonato
- Consecration: 4 January 1986 by Alfredo Battisti

Personal details
- Born: Pietro Brollo; 1 December 1933 (age 91); Tolmezzo, Udine, Italy
- Motto: In verbo tuo laxabo rete
- Coat of arms

Pietro Brollo (1 December 1933 – 5 December 2019) was an Italian Roman Catholic bishop.

Brollo was born in Italy and was ordained to the priesthood in 1957. He served as titular bishop of Zuglio and auxiliary bishop of the Roman Catholic Archdiocese of Udine, Italy, from 1985 to 1995. He then served as bishop of the Roman Catholic Diocese of Belluno-Feltre, Italy, from 1995 to 2000. Brollo served as archbishop of the Udine Archdiocese from 2000 to 2009.
