= Diocese of Belluno-Feltre =

Roman Catholic diocese in Italy

Coordinates: 46.1333°N 12.2167°E

Diocese of Belluno-Feltre Dioecesis Bellunensis-Feltrensis

Catholic
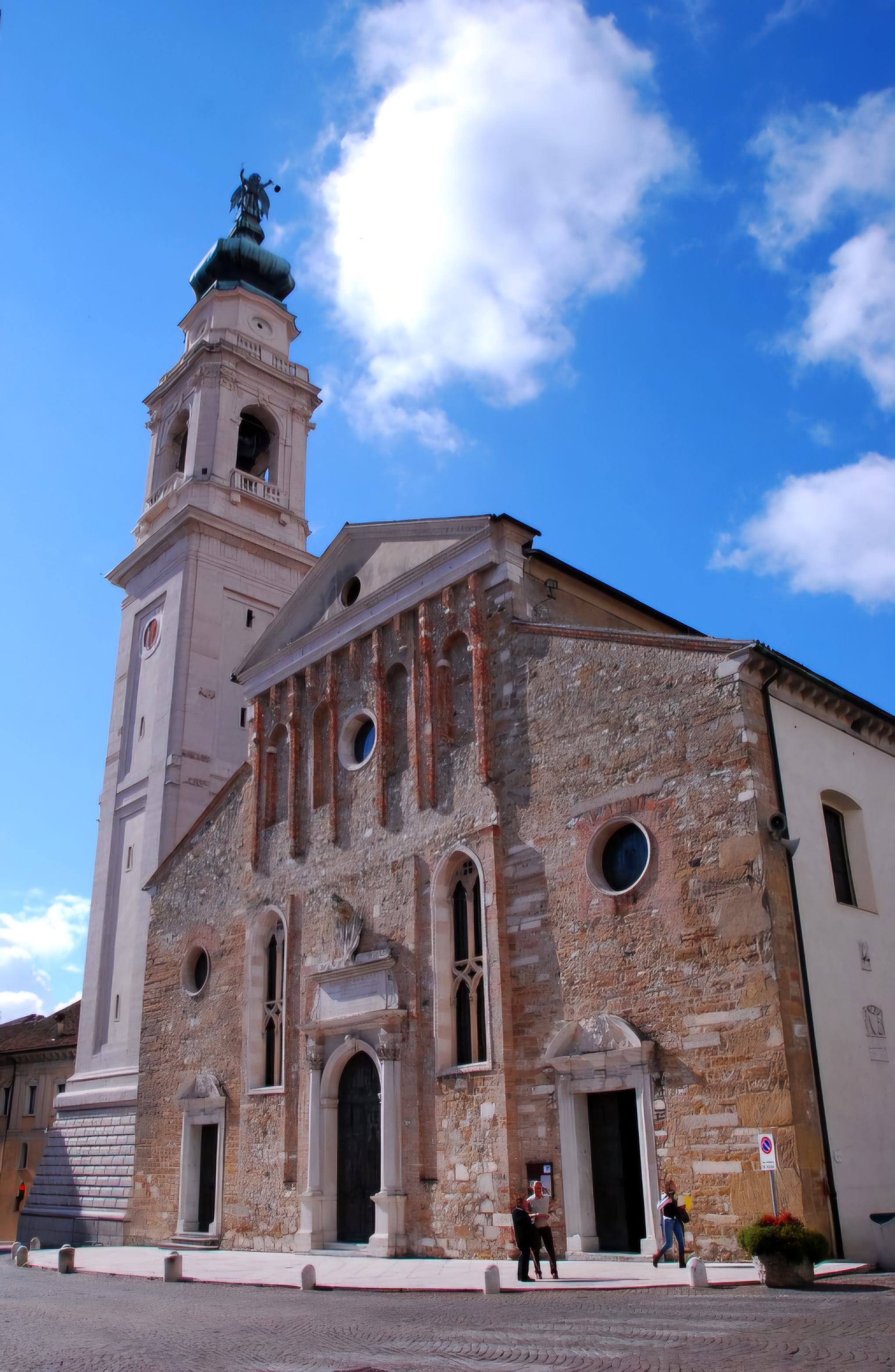
- Belluno Cathedral

Location
- Country: Italy
- Ecclesiastical province: Venice

Statistics
- Area: 3,263 km^{2} (1,260 sq mi)
- Population: Total; Catholics: (as of 2023); 181,530; 174,513 (96.1%)
- Parishes: 59

Information
- Denomination: Catholic Church
- Rite: Roman Rite
- Established: 2nd Century
- Cathedral: Basilica Cattedrale di S. Martino (Belluno)
- Co-cathedral: Concattedrale di S. Pietro Apostolo (Feltre)
- Secular priests: 124 (diocesan) ▼15 (Religious Orders) ▼7 Permanent Deacons ▲

Current leadership
- Pope: Leo XIV
- Bishop: Renato Marangoni
- Bishops emeritus: Giuseppe Andrich

Map

Website
- www.chiesabellunofeltre.it

The Diocese of Belluno-Feltre (Latin: Dioecesis Bellunensis-Feltrensis) is a Latin diocese of the Catholic Church located in the Veneto, northern Italy, organized in its current form in 1986. From 1197 to 1762, and again from 1818 to 1986, the Diocese of Belluno and the Diocese of Feltre were united under a single bishop, with the name diocese of Belluno e Feltre. The current diocese is a suffragan of the Patriarchate of Venice.

== History ==
Christianity is said to have been first preached there by St. Hermagoras, a disciple of St. Mark and first Bishop of Aquileia, and next by Prosdocimus, first Bishop of Padua. As Francesco Lanzoni points out, there is no actual evidence. Ferdinando Ughelli places the first bishop, Theodorus, in the reign of Emperor Commodus (180–192), and the second, St. Salvator, as succeeding under Pertinax (193). A second Bishop Theodorus is said to have brought from Egypt the remains of St. Giovata (Zotas), patron of the city. A "Passion of S. Zotas", found in a manuscript of the 12th century, claims that Zotas had been executed at Ptolemais (?) in Libya by an official of the Emperor Maximianus (285–305); his body was buried by Bishop Theodorus. Zotas, however, is completely unknown to the ancient martyrologies of Egypt and Libya. Modern authors of Belluno claim that Bishop Theodore left his diocese and brought the remains of Zotas to Belluno, where, in due course, he was elected bishop. The tales carry no weight.

The first bishop known to history is a certain Laurentius. In 587, he attended the schismatic assembly convened by Severus, Patriarch of Aquileia, in connection with the schism of the Three Chapters.

At the end of the 10th century Belluno was affected by the political disturbances then agitating the Venetian provinces. On 10 September 963, Bishop Joannes II (959) obtained from Emperor Otto I for himself and his successors the title of count and temporal sovereignty over the city and the surrounding territory. He also fortified the city.

The twelfth century was a stormy period for Belluno, in both civil and ecclesiastical respects. In the spring of 1197, Bishop Gerardo de Taccoli joined the united armies of Belluno, Padua and Forogiulio to besiege the Castello of Zumelle. On 20 April, at the battle of Cesana, Bishop Gerardo of Belluno was killed by the soldiers of Treviso. The Patriarch of Aquileia immediately excommunicated the people of Treviso. Belluno was left without a bishop. In the 16th century, Giulio Doglioni published a catalogue of bishops of Belluno from old manuscripts, which contained the notice: "Drudus de Camino Feltren. et Bellun. episcopus, sub quo primum uniti sunt episcopatus Belluni et Feltri." Another ancient catalogue was published by Gianantonio degli Egregii, containing the statement: "Uniti sunt episcopalus Belluni et Feltri. Successit episcopus Drudus episcopo Gerardo." Bishop Drudus succeeded the murdered Gerardus as bishop of the united dioceses; Drudus died in 1200. The two dioceses continued to be suffragans of the Patriarch of Aquileia.

In 1462, at the request of the Venetian Republic, the two dioceses were separated.

The first Bishop of Belluno following the separation was Ludovico Donato. Bishops Pietro Barozzi, Mose Buffarello, and Bernardo Rossi (1499) rebuilt the cathedral. Luigi Lollin (1595) promoted the love of learning among the clergy and left bequests to provide for a number of priests at the University of Padua. Giulio Berlendis (1655) completed the work of enforcing the Tridentine reforms, and Gianfrancesco Bembo, a member of the Somaschi (1695), was zealous in the cause of popular education.

In 1751, pressured both by Austria and Venice, who were exasperated by the numerous discords in the patriarchate of Aquileia, Pope Benedict XIV was compelled to intervene in the ecclesiastical and political disturbances. In the bull "Injuncta Nobis" of 6 July 1751, the patriarchate of Aquileia was completely suppressed, and in its place the Pope created two separate archdioceses, Udine and Goritza. The dioceses which had been suffragans of Aquileia and were under Venetian political control, Belluno among them, were assigned to the new archdiocese of Udine.

=== Post-Napoleonic reorganization ===
In 1818 the diocese of Belluno was again united with that of Feltre. The violent expansionist military policies of the French Revolutionary Republic had brought confusion and dislocation to the Po Valley. Following the redistribution of European territories at the Congress of Vienna, the Papacy faced the difficult task of restoring and restructuring the Church in various territories, according to the wishes of their rulers. Belluno and Venice were under the control of Austria, and therefore a Concordat had to be negotiated with the government of the Emperor Francis. One of the requirements of the Austrian government was the elimination of several metropolitanates and the suppression of a number of bishoprics which were no longer viable due to the bad climate (malaria and cholera) and the impoverishment of the dioceses due to migration and industrialization; it was expected that this would be done to the benefit of the Patriarchate of Venice.

Pope Pius VII, therefore, issued the bull "De Salute Dominici Gregis" on 1 May 1818, embodying the conclusions of arduous negotiations. The metropolitan archbishopric of Udine was abolished and its bishop made suffragan to Venice. The dioceses of Caprularum (Caorle) and Torcella were suppressed and their territories assigned to the Patriarchate of Venice; Belluno and Feltre were united under a single bishop, aeque personaliter, and assigned to Venice; Padua and Verona became suffragans of Venice.

=== Chapters and cathedrals ===
The cathedral of Belluno is dedicated to S. Martin. It is staffed and administered (1847) by a Chapter composed of one dignity, the Dean, and ten Canons, assisted by several chaplains mansionarii and chaplains prebendary.

The co-cathedral at Feltre is dedicated to S. Peter. It had a Chapter which was composed of two dignities (the Dean and the Archdeacon) and twelve Canons. The co-cathedral functions as a parish, and therefore the Canon called the Sacristan has the responsibility of caring for the spiritual needs of the parishioners ("the cure of souls").

=== Diocesan synods ===
A diocesan synod was an irregularly held, but important, meeting of the bishop of a diocese and his clergy. Its purpose was (1) to proclaim generally the various decrees already issued by the bishop; (2) to discuss and ratify measures on which the bishop chose to consult with his clergy; (3) to publish statutes and decrees of the diocesan synod, of the provincial synod, and of the Holy See.

Bishop Giovanni Battista Valier (1575–1596) presided over a diocesan synod in 1575. He was particularly concerned with liturgical laxness, and with teaching correct doctrine in face of Protestant infiltration from Germany; his predecessor had already introduced the Franciscans and the Inquisition to Belluno.

Bishop Giovanni Delfin (1626–1634) presided over a diocesan synod in the cathedral of Belluno on 27 and 28 April 1629, and had the constitutions of the synod published. On 25–27 October 1639, Bishop Giovanni Tommaso Malloni (1634–1649) held a synod for the diocese of Belluno, and published the decrees of the synod.

Bishop Gianfrancesco Bembo (1694–1720) presided over a diocesan synod on 9–11 July 1703, and published the decrees. BIshop Giacomo Costa (1747–1755) held a synod from 30 August to 1 September 1750.

On 2–4 July 1861, Bishop Giovanni Renier (1855–1871) held a synod for the dioceses of Belluno and Feltre in Belluno. Renier himself was a participant in the provincial council of Venice in 1863.

Bishop Pietro Brollo (1996-2001) presided over the first diocesan synod of the newly reconstituted diocese of Belluno-Feltre.

=== Reorganization ===
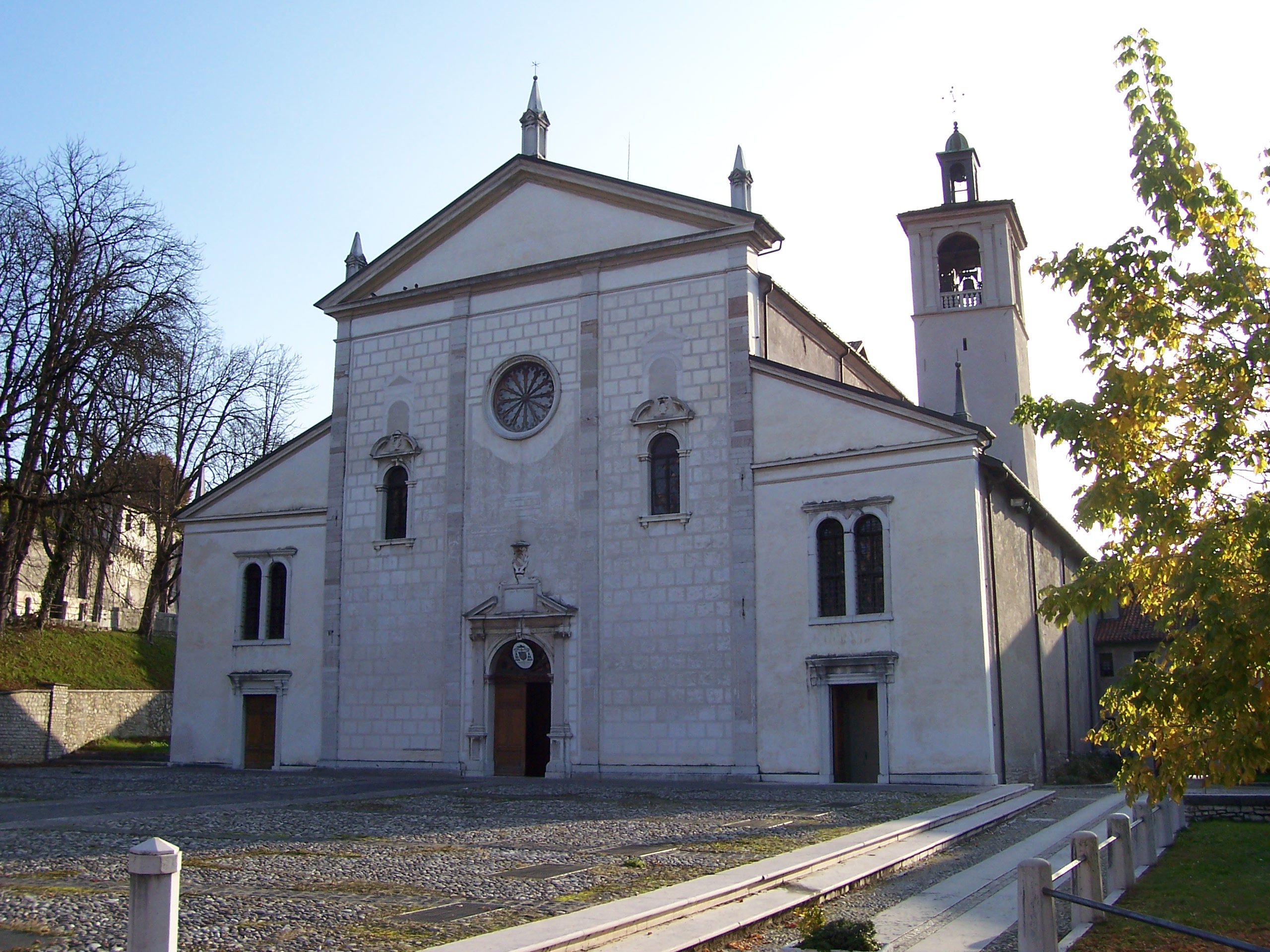
Co-cathedral Feltre

In a decree of the Second Vatican Council, it was recommended that dioceses be reorganized to take into account modern developments. A project begun on orders from Pope John XXIII, and continued under his successors, was intended to reduce the number of dioceses in Italy and to rationalize their borders in terms of modern population changes and shortages of clergy. The change was made urgent because of changes made to the Concordat between the Italian State and the Holy See on 18 February 1984, and embodied in a law of 3 June 1985. The change was approved by Pope John Paul II in an audience of 27 September 1986, and by a decree of the Sacred Congregation of Bishops of the Papal Curia on 30 September 1986. The dioceses of Belluno and Feltre, which had up to that point shared a single bishop while retaining two diocesan structures, were united into a single diocese. Its name was to be Dioecesis Bellunensis-Feltrensis. The seat of the diocese was to be in Belluno. The former cathedral in Feltre was to have the honorary title of co-cathedral, and its Chapter was to be the Capitulum Concathedralis. There was to be only one episcopal curia, one seminary, one ecclesiastical tribunal; and all the clergy were to be incardinated in the diocese of Belluno-Feltre.

== Bishops ==
=== Diocese of Belluno ===
...

- Laurentius (attested 589–591)

...

- Odelbertus (attested 877)

...

- Almo (Aimo) (attested 877–923)

...

- Joannes (attested 963–998)

...

- Lodovicus (attested 1015–1021)
- Albuinus (attested 1027))
- Hezemann (attested 1031–1046)
- Marius (attested 1049)
- Wolfram ( ? )
- Reginaldus (attested 1080–1116)

...

- Bonifacius (1139-1156)
- Otto (1156-1183)
- Gerardus de Taccoli (1184–1197)

=== Diocese of Belluno e Feltre ===
United: 1197 with Diocese of Feltre

- Drudus de Camino (attested, as Bishop of Feltre, 1177–1200)
- Anselmus de Braganze (d. 1204)
- Torrentinus (1204–1209)
- Philippus (1209–1224)
- Oddo (1225–1235?)
- Eleazar (attested 1235–1239)
- Alexander de Foro (attested 1243–1246?)
- Tiso (1247-1257)
- Adalgerius (1257–1290?)
- Jacobus Casali, O.Min. (1291–1298)
- Alessandro Novello, O.Min. (1298–1320)
- Manfredus Collalto (1320–1321)
- Gregorius, O.P. (?) (1323–1326)
- Gorzias (1327–1349)
- Henricus de Waldeichke (1349–1354)
- Jacobus de Brünn (1354–1370)
- Antonius de Nastriis (1370–1392)
- Alberto di S. Giorgio (1394–1398)
- Giovanni Capo di Gallo (1398–1404)
- Enrico Scarampi (9 Apr 1404 – 29 Sep 1440)
- Thomas (Tomasini) (1440–1446)
- Jacobus Zeno (1447–1460)
- Francesco Legnamine (de Padua) (18 Apr 1460 – 11 Jan 1462)

=== Diocese of Belluno ===
Split: 1462 to reestablish Roman Catholic Diocese of Feltre

- Ludovico Donato (Donà) (2 Apr 1462 –1465
- Mosè Buffarello (5 Jan 1465 – 1471)
- Pietro Barozzi (1471–1487)
- Bernardo de' Rossi (1488–1499)
- Bartolomeo Trevisan (1499–1509)
- Galeso Nichesola (19 Sep 1509 – 2 Aug 1527)
- Giovanni Battista Casale (18 Sep 1527 – Sep 1536)
- Cardinal Gasparo Contarini (1536–1542)
- Giulio Contarini (1542–1575)
- Giovanni Battista Valier (1575–1596)
- Luigi Lollino (1596–1625)
- [ Panfilo Persico (1625 – 14 Dec 1625)]
- Giovanni Delfino (1626–1634 Resigned)
- Giovanni Tommaso Malloni, C.R.Som. (1634–1649)

Sede vacante (1649–1653)

- Giulio Berlendi, C.R.Som. (1653–1694?)
- Gianfrancesco Bembo, C.R.S. (1 Mar 1694 – 21 Jul 1720)
- Valerio Rota (16 Sep 1720 – 8 Sep 1730)
- Gaetano Zuanelli (11 Dec 1730 – 25 Jan 1736)
- Domenico Nicola Condulmer (27 Feb 1736 – 14 Mar 1747)
- Giacomo Costa, C.R. (29 May 1747 –1755)
- Giovanni Battista Sandi (24 May 1756 – 12 Aug 1785)
- Sebastiano Alcaini, C.R.S. (26 Sep 1785 –1803)

=== Diocese of Belluno e Feltre ===
United: 1 May 1818 with Roman Catholic Diocese of Feltre

Sede vacante (1803–1819)

- Luigi Zuppani (23 Aug 1819 Confirmed – 26 Nov 1841 Died)
- Antonio Gava (22 Jun 1843 Confirmed – 3 Nov 1852 Resigned)
- Vincent Scarpa (7 Apr 1854 Confirmed – 5 May 1854 Died)
- Giovanni Renier (17 Dec 1855 Confirmed – 12 Apr 1871 Died)
- Salvatore Giovanni Battista Bolognesi, C.O. (27 Oct 1871 – 29 Jan 1899 Died)
- Francesco Cherubin (19 Jun 1899 – 3 Jul 1910 Died)
- Giuseppe Foschiani (3 Jul 1910 Succeeded – 5 Oct 1913 Died)
- Giosuè Cattarossi (1913–1944)
- Girolamo Bartolomeo Bortignon, O.F.M. Cap. (9 Sep 1945 –1949)
- Gioacchino Muccin (19 May 1949 – 1 Sep 1975 Retired)
- Maffeo Giovanni Ducoli (7 Oct 1975 – 2 Feb 1996 Retired)

=== Diocese of Belluno-Feltre ===
since 30 September 1986

- Pietro Brollo (2 Jan 1996 –2000)
- Vincenzo Savio, S.D.B. (9 Dec 2000 – 31 Mar 2004)
- Giuseppe Andrich (29 May 2004 – 10 Feb 2016 Retired)
- Renato Marangoni (10 Feb 2016 – )

== See also ==
- Roman Catholic Diocese of Feltre

== Books ==
=== Episcopal lists ===
- Eubel, Conradus, ed. (1913). Hierarchia catholica (in Latin). Vol. 1 (second ed.). Münster: Libreria Regensbergiana.
- Eubel, Conradus, ed. (1914). Hierarchia catholica (in Latin). Vol. 2 (second ed.). Münster: Libreria Regensbergiana.
- Eubel, Conradus; Gulik, Guilelmus, eds. (1923). Hierarchia catholica (in Latin). Vol. 3 (second ed.). Münster: Libreria Regensbergiana.
- Gams, Pius Bonifatius (1873). Series episcoporum Ecclesiae catholicae: quotquot innotuerunt a beato Petro apostolo (in Latin). Ratisbon: Typis et Sumptibus Georgii Josephi Manz. pp. 776–777.
- Gauchat, Patritius (Patrice) (1935). Hierarchia catholica (in Latin). Vol. IV (1592-1667). Münster: Libraria Regensbergiana.
- Ritzler, Remigius; Sefrin, Pirminus (1952). Hierarchia catholica medii et recentis aevi (in Latin). Vol. Tomus V (1667-1730). Patavii: Messagero di S. Antonio.
- Ritzler, Remigius; Sefrin, Pirminus (1958). Hierarchia catholica medii et recentis aevi (in Latin). Vol. VI (1730-1799). Patavii: Messagero di S. Antonio.
- Ritzler, Remigius; Sefrin, Pirminus (1968). Hierarchia Catholica medii et recentioris aevi (in Latin). Vol. VII (1800–1846). Monasterii: Libreria Regensburgiana.
- Ritzler, Remigius; Sefrin, Pirminus (1978). Hierarchia catholica Medii et recentioris aevi (in Latin). Vol. VIII (1846–1903). Il Messaggero di S. Antonio.
- Pięta, Zenon (2002). Hierarchia catholica medii et recentioris aevi (in Latin). Vol. IX (1903–1922). Padua: Messagero di San Antonio. ISBN 978-88-250-1000-8.

=== Studies ===
- Andrich, Giuseppe, ed. (1996). Diocesi di Belluno e Feltre. Storia religiosa del Veneto, 7 (in Italian). Padova: Giunta regionale del Veneto. ISBN 978-88-7706-119-5.
- Argenta, Giuseppe (1981). I vescovi di Belluno dal 170 al 1204. Belluno: Campedel. (in Italian)
- Argenta, G. (1986). I vescovi di Feltre e di Belluno dal 1204 al 1462. Belluno: Campedel 1986. (in Italian)
- Azzoni, Rambaldo degli (1778). Notizie de' vescovi di Feltre, e di Belluno dopo la unione di que' vescovadi dall'anno 1116. fino al 1320 (in Italian). Treviso.
- Cappelletti, Giuseppe (1854). Le chiese d'Italia dalla loro origine sino ai nostri giorni (in Italian). Vol. decimo (10). Venezia: G. Antonelli. pp. 105–219.
- De Donà, Giovanni (1878). Serie dei decani del capitolo della cattedrale di Belluno (in Italian). Belluno: Tip. Deliberali.
- Doglioni, Lucio (1816). Notizie istoriche e geografiche della città di Belluno e sua provincia (in Italian). Belluno: Per Francesc' Antonio Tissi.
- Kehr, Paul Fridolin (1923). Italia Pontificia Vol. VII:l Venetiae et Histria, Pars I: Provincia Aquileiensis. Berlin: Weidmann, pp. 212–304. (in Latin).
- Lanzoni, Francesco (1927). Le diocesi d'Italia dalle origini al principio del secolo VII (an. 604). Faenza: F. Lega, pp. 905–906. (in Italian)
- Schwartz, Gerhard (1907). Die Besetzung der Bistümer Reichsitaliens unter den sächsischen und salischen Kaisern: mit den Listen der Bischöfe, 951-1122. Leipzig: B.G. Teubner. pp. 43–45; 52–53. (in German)
- Ughelli, Ferdinando (1720). Italia Sacra sive De Episcopis Italiae et insularum adjacentium (in Latin). Vol. Tomus quintus. Venezia: apud Sebastianum Coleti. pp. 142–170, 368–378.
