= Archdiocese of Udine =

Roman Catholic archdiocese in Italy

Coordinates: 46.0667°N 13.2333°E

Archdiocese of Udine Archidioecesis Utinensis

Catholic
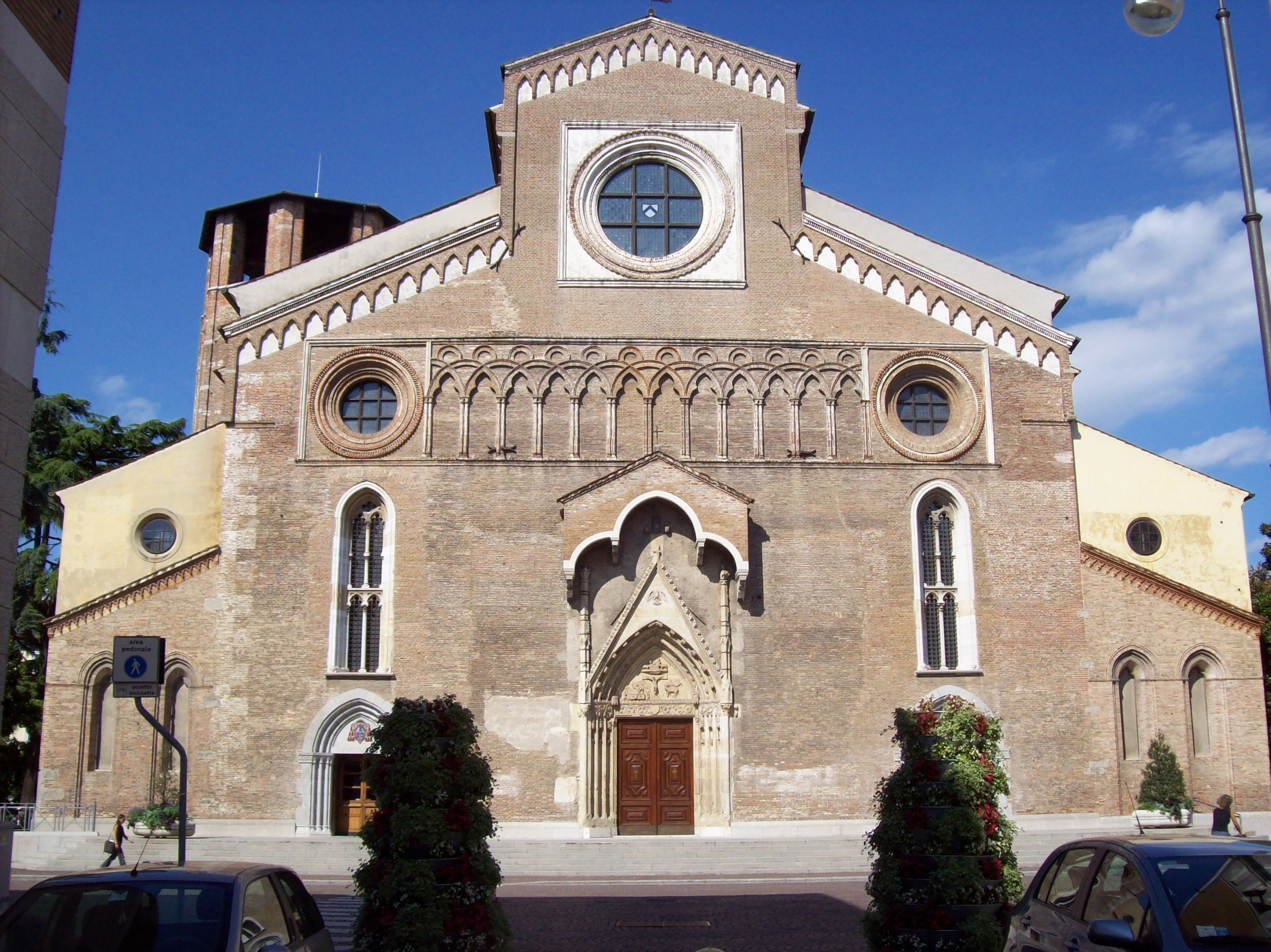
- Udine Cathedral

Location
- Country: Italy
- Ecclesiastical province: Udine

Statistics
- Area: 4,500 km^{2} (1,700 sq mi)
- Population: Total; Catholics: (as of 2023); 485,800 (est.) ▼; 470,600 (guess) ▼
- Parishes: 374

Information
- Denomination: Catholic
- Sui iuris church: Latin Church
- Rite: Roman Rite
- Established: 1752
- Cathedral: Cattedrale Metropolitana di S. Maria Annunziata
- Secular priests: 219 (diocesan) ▼62 (Religious Orders) ▼29 Permanent Deacons

Current leadership
- Pope: Leo XIV
- Metropolitan Archbishop: Riccardo Lamba
- Bishops emeritus: Andrea Bruno Mazzocato

Map

Website
- diocesiudine.it

The Archdiocese of Udine (Latin: Archidioecesis Utinensis) is a Latin Church ecclesiastical territory or archdiocese of the Catholic Church in Italy. The see was established in 1752 when the Patriarchal see of Aquileia was divided. From 1818 to 1846 it was a suffragan diocese of the Patriarch of Venice.

== Bishops and Archbishops of Udine ==
=== Archbishops of Udine, 1752–1818 ===
- Cardinal Daniele Delfino (1752 Appointed – 13 Mar 1762 Died), former Patriarch of Aquileia
- Archbishop Bartolomeo Gradenigo (13 Mar 1762 Succeeded – 2 Nov 1765 Died)
- Archbishop Giovanni Hieronymo Gradenigo, C.R. † (27 Jan 1766 Appointed – 1786 Died)
- Archbishop Niccolò Sagredo ( 1786 Appointed – 1792 Died)
- Cardinal Pietro Antonio Zorzi, C.R.S. † (24 Sep 1792 Appointed – 17 Dec 1803 Died)
- Archbishop Baldassare Rasponti (18 Sep 1807 Appointed – 14 Feb 1814 Died)

=== Bishops of Udine, 1818–1846 ===
- Bishop Emmanuele Lodi, O.P. (28 Aug 1819 Appointed – Feb 1845 Died)
- Archbishop Zaccaria Bricito (21 Dec 1846 Appointed – 6 Feb 1851 Died)

=== Archbishops of Udine, 1846–present ===
- Cardinal Giuseppe Luigi Trevisanato (27 Sep 1852 Appointed – 7 Apr 1862 Appointed, Patriarch of Venice)
- Archbishop Andrea Casasola (28 Sep 1863 Appointed – 1884 Died)
- Archbishop Giovanni Maria Berengo (10 Nov 1884 Appointed – 1896 Died)
- Archbishop Pietro Zamburlini (22 Jun 1896 Appointed – 1909 Died)
- Archbishop Antonio Anastasio Rossi (8 Jan 1910 Appointed – 19 Dec 1927 Appointed, Latin Patriarch of Constantinople)
- Archbishop Giuseppe Nogara (27 Jan 1928 Appointed – 9 Dec 1955 Died)
- Archbishop Giuseppe Zaffonato (31 Jan 1956 Appointed – 29 Sep 1972 Resigned)
- Archbishop Alfredo Battisti (13 Dec 1972 Appointed – 28 Oct 2000 Retired)
- Archbishop Pietro Brollo (28 Oct 2000 Appointed – 20 Aug 2009 Retired)
- Archbishop Andrea Bruno Mazzocato (20 Aug 2009 – 23 February 2024 Retired)
- Archbishop Riccardo Lamba (23 February 2024 – current)

== See also ==
- Archbishop of Gorizia (Görz)
- Patriarch of Aquileia

== Books ==
- Gams, Pius Bonifatius (1873). Series episcoporum Ecclesiae catholicae: quotquot innotuerunt a beato Petro apostolo. Ratisbon: Typis et Sumptibus Georgii Josephi Manz. p. 775.
- Ritzler, Remigius; Sefrin, Pirminus (1958). Hierarchia catholica medii et recentis aevi. Vol. Tomus VI (1730-1799). Patavii: Messagero di S. Antonio. p. 428.
- Ritzler, Remigius; Sefrin, Pirminus (1968). Hierarchia Catholica medii et recentioris aevi (in Latin). Vol. VII (1800–1846). Monasterii: Libreria Regensburgiana.
- Remigius Ritzler; Pirminus Sefrin (1978). Hierarchia catholica Medii et recentioris aevi (in Latin). Vol. VIII (1846–1903). Il Messaggero di S. Antonio.
- Pięta, Zenon (2002). Hierarchia catholica medii et recentioris aevi (in Latin). Vol. IX (1903–1922). Padua: Messagero di San Antonio. ISBN 978-88-250-1000-8.

=== Studies ===
- Cappelletti, Giuseppe (1851). Le chiese d'Italia (in Italian). Vol. ottavo. Venice: Antonelli. pp. 859–875.
- Ciconi, Giandomenico (1862). Udine e sua provincia, illustrazione di Giandomenico Ciconi (in Italian) (seconda ed.). Udine: Tipografia Trombetti-Murero.
- Dichiarazione e ritrattazione del metropolitano capitolo di Udine intorno al suo noto indirizzo de' 31. gennaio 1811 (in Italian). 1814.
