= Gianfrancesco Bembo (bishop) =

Most Reverend Gianfrancesco Bembo
- Bishop of Belluno
- Church: Catholic Church
- Diocese: Diocese of Belluno
- In office: 1694–1720
- Predecessor: Giulio Berlendi
- Successor: Valerio Rota

Orders
- Ordination: 1678
- Consecration: 7 March 1694 by Paluzzo Paluzzi Altieri Degli Albertoni

Personal details
- Born: 30 December 1659 Venice, Italy
- Died: 21 July 1720 (age 60) Belluno, Italy

Gianfrancesco Bembo, C.R.S. or Giovanni Francesco Bembo (30 December 1659 – 21 July 1720) was a Roman Catholic prelate who served as Bishop of Belluno (1694–1720).

== Biography ==
Gianfrancesco Bembo was born in Venice, Italy on 30 December 1659 and ordained a priest in the Clerks Regular of Somasca in 1678. On 1 March 1694, he was appointed during the papacy of Pope Innocent XII as Bishop of Belluno. On 7 March 1694, he was consecrated bishop by Paluzzo Paluzzi Altieri Degli Albertoni, Cardinal-Bishop of Palestrina, with Odoardo Cibo, Titular Patriarch of Constantinople, and Petrus Draghi Bartoli, Titular Patriarch of Alexandria, serving as co-consecrators. He served as Bishop of Belluno until his death on 21 July 1720.

While bishop, he was the principal co-consecrator of Marco Gradenigo, Coadjutor Patriarch of Aquileia and Titular Bishop of Titopolis (1701) .

== External links and additional sources ==
- Cheney, David M. "Diocese of Belluno-Feltre". Catholic-Hierarchy.org. (for Chronology of Bishops) ^{[self-published]}
- Chow, Gabriel. "Diocese of Belluno-Feltre (Italy)". GCatholic.org. (for Chronology of Bishops) ^{[self-published]}

Catholic Church titles
Preceded by Giulio Berlendi	Bishop of Belluno; 1694–1720	Succeeded by Valerio Rota
