= Riccardo Lamba =

Italian Archbishop

His Excellency, The Most Reverend Monsignor Riccardo Lamba
- Metropolitan Archbishop of Udine
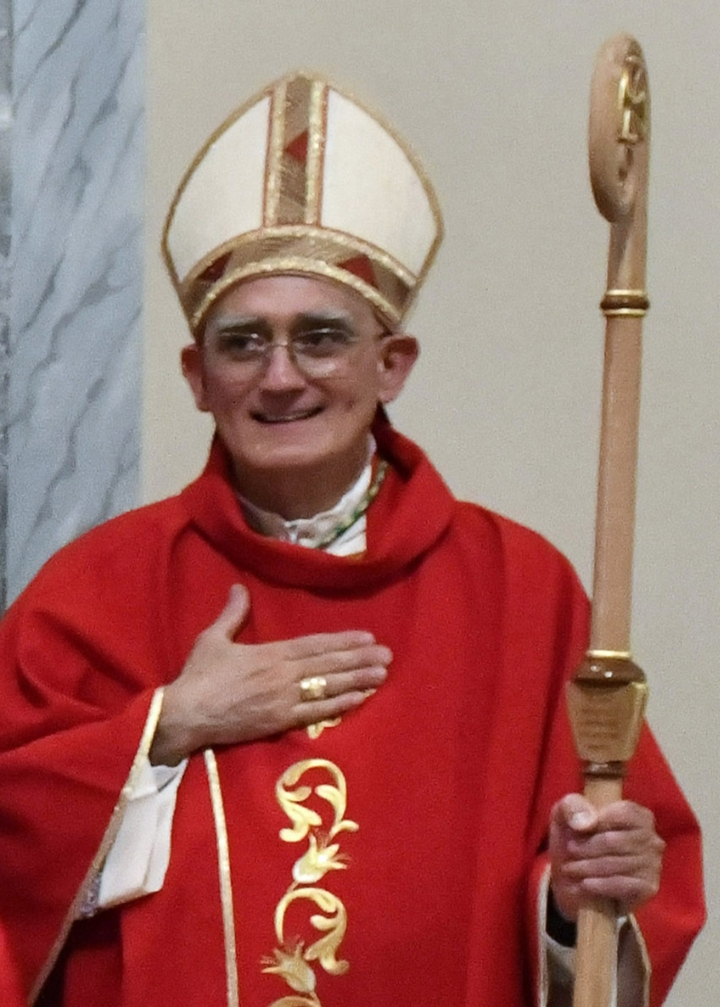
- Mons. Riccardo Lamba
- Church: Catholic Church
- Archdiocese: Udine
- Province: Udine
- Metropolis: Udine
- Appointed: 23 February 2024
- Installed: 5 May 2024
- Predecessor: Andrea Bruno Mazzocato
- Previous post: Auxiliary Bishop of Rome (2022-2024)

Orders
- Ordination: 6 May 1986 by Cardinal Ugo Poletti
- Consecration: 29 June 2022 by Cardinal Angelo De Donatis
- Rank: Metropolitan Archbishop

Personal details
- Born: Riccardo Lamba; November 26, 1956 (age 69) Caracas, Venezuela.
- Denomination: Catholic Church
- Occupation: Archbishop, Prelate
- Education: Pontifical Gregorian University
- Motto: Illum Oportet Crescere Me Autem Minui
- Coat of arms: Riccardo Lamba's coat of arms

Styles of Riccardo Lamba
- Reference style: His Excellency
- Spoken style: Your Excellency
- Religious style: Archbishop

Ordination history of Riccardo Lamba
History
Priestly ordination
- Ordained by: Ugo Poletti
Episcopal consecration
- Principal consecrator: Angelo De Donatis
- Co-consecrators: Francesco Montenegro, Augusto Paolo Lojudice

Riccardo Lamba (born 30 November 1956) is an Italian prelate of the Catholic Church. He was ordained as a priest in 1986. From 2022 to 2024 he was auxiliary bishop of Diocese of Rome. In 2024 he became the Metropolitan Archbishop of Udine.

== Biography ==
He was born on 30 November 1956 in Caracas. After graduated in medicine, he attended the seminary. 6 May 1986 he was ordained as a priest for Diocese of Rome. He became the auxiliary bishop of Rome on 27 May 2022. He was consecrated a bishop on 29 June 2022. On 23 February 2024, he was appointed as Metropolitan Archbishop of Udine and Abbot of Rosazzo.

He was enthroned in the Udine Cathedral on 5 May 2024.
