= Gian Matteo Giberti =

Italian diplomat and bishop

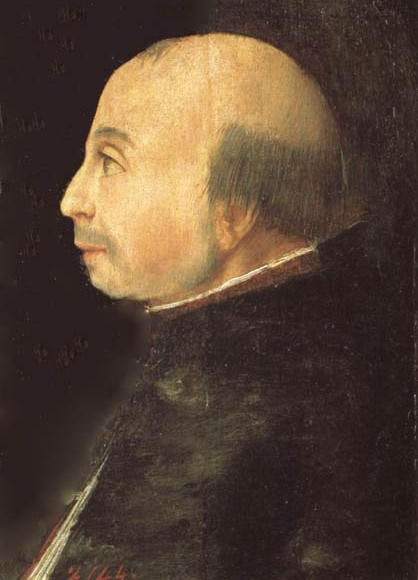
Gian Matteo Giberti (1495–1543)

Gian Matteo Giberti (20 September 1495 – 30 December 1543) was an Italian diplomat, Bishop of Verona.

== Biography ==
Born at Palermo, he was the natural son of Francesco Giberti, a Genoese naval captain. In 1513, he was admitted to the household of Cardinal Giulio de' Medici, and advanced so rapidly in Latin and Greek that he soon became an eminent member of the Academia Romana. Later, he was appointed the cardinal's secretary, and Pope Leo X, with whom he had political dealings, valued his opinions and advice.

In 1521, he was chief intermediary with the envoy of Emperor Charles V. He used his influence over the pope to protect and help struggling men of letters. He led a severely religious life, and was a member of the Oratory of Divine Love (Sodalitium Divini Amoris) of St. Cajetan and Cardinal Carafa (future pope Paul IV). After his ordination to the priesthood and the death of Leo X, he was sent by Cardinal Giulio, his patron, on a mission to Charles V, and returned to Rome with the new pope, Adrian VI.

Pope Clement VII, immediately after his election, made him Datario (1523), and in 1524, at the request of the Doge of Venice, he was appointed Bishop of Verona. Being obliged, against his will, to remain in Rome, he had himself represented at Verona by a vicar-general.

Giberti was chosen a member of the Consilium de Emendanda Ecclesia, the reform committee decreed by Paul III, but political events soon put an end to these labours. At Pavia (1525), he tried to make peace between Francis I of France and Charles V. It was at his prompting that Clement VII espoused the cause of France; the League of Cognac (22 May 1526) was also his work.

After the Sack of Rome (1527), he was put in prison and barely escaped death. He succeeded in making his escape and went to Verona (1528), intending to devote himself to his diocese. He was done with politics, all the more because the pope had gone over to the imperial cause. However, he appeared from time to time in the Curia. Pope Paul III recalled him to Rome for the work of the Reform Committee; among other missions, he was sent to Trent to make preparations for the council.

His efforts to reform his diocese, whose clergy were in a deplorable state, were crowned with success. The Tridentine reforms were put in force long before the council assembled. St. Charles Borromeo, before taking charge of his see at Milan, wished to study Giberti's system at Verona, and chose as his vicar-general a priest from Verona trained in Giberti's school.

His first aim was to improve the standard of ecclesiastical knowledge. In his own palace, he set up a printing press which turned out numerous editions of the Greek Fathers, in whose writings he was very learned. He reformed the choir-school of Verona; for the instruction of the young, he had printed the catechism known as Dialogus, the work of Tullio Crispoldi (1539).

At Verona, moreover, he gathered around him a group of learned men to assist him in his efforts at reform. His complete works were edited by the scholars Girolamo and Pietro Ballerini (Constitutiones Gibertinae, Costituzioni per le Monache, Monitiones generales, Edicta Selecta, Lettere Scelte, 1733, 1740), together with an appendix containing the story of his life, a Dissertatio de restitutâ ante concilium Tridentinum per Jo. Matth. Giberti ecclesiasticâ disciplina, and two panegyrics.

== Sources ==
- Cheney, David M. "Diocese of Verona". Catholic-Hierarchy.org. (for Chronology of Bishops) ^{[self-published]}
- Chow, Gabriel. "Diocese of Verona". GCatholic.org. (for Chronology of Bishops) ^{[self-published]}
- Cheney, David M. "Nunciature to Venice". Catholic-Hierarchy.org. ^{[self-published]}
- Herbermann, Charles, ed. (1913). "Gian Matteo Giberti". Catholic Encyclopedia. New York: Robert Appleton Company.

Catholic Church titles
Preceded by Marco Cornaro (cardinal)	Bishop of Verona; 1524–1543	Succeeded by Pietro Lippomano
Preceded by René du Puy	Bishop of Lodève; 1526–1528	Succeeded by Laurent Toscani
Preceded by Girolamo Aleandro	Apostolic Nuncio to Venice; 1534–1537	Succeeded by Girolamo Verallo
