= Gasparo Contarini =

Italian diplomat, cardinal and Bishop of Belluno (1483-1542)

His Eminence Gasparo Contarini
- Bishop of Belluno
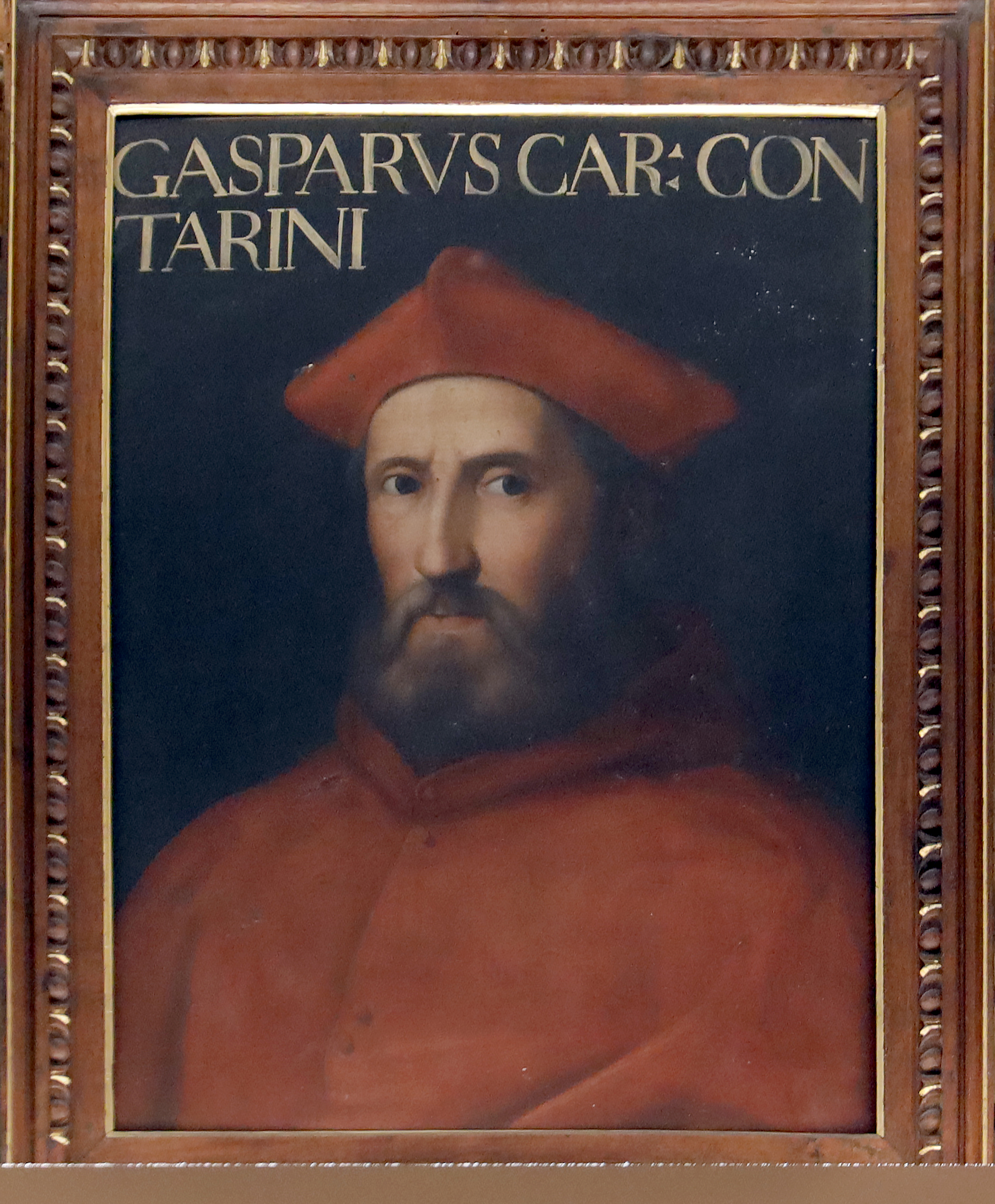
- Church: Catholic Church
- Diocese: Belluno
- Appointed: 23 October 1536
- Term ended: 24 August 1542
- Predecessor: Giovanni Battista Casale
- Successor: Giulio Contarini

Orders
- Consecration: 17 February 1538
- Created cardinal: 21 May 1535 by Pope Paul III

Personal details
- Born: 16 October 1483 Venice
- Died: 24 August 1542 (aged 55) Bologna
- Coat of arms: Gasparo Contarini's coat of arms

Gasparo Contarini (16 October 1483 – 24 August 1542) was an Italian diplomat, cardinal, and Bishop of Belluno. He advocated for dialogue with Protestants during the Reformation. Born in Venice, he served as the Republic's ambassador to Charles V during its war with him. He was the first to explain the time discrepancy in the Magellan–Elcano circumnavigation due to Earth's rotation. He participated in diplomatic efforts and reconciliations, and became a cardinal, even though he was initially a layman. Contarini was a leader in the reform movement within the Roman Catholic Church. He played a role in the papal approval of the Society of Jesus (Jesuits). He was also involved in attempts to restore religious unity in Germany.

Contarini's work, De magistratibus et republica venetorum, praised the Venetian government system for its harmony, fairness, and stability. He described the electoral process, particularly the lottery system for choosing officials, emphasizing fairness and equality. Contarini's depiction of the Doge, Venice's leader, highlighted the balance between symbolic monarchy and the power of civic institutions. He portrayed the Doge as both a regal figure and a representative of the city's republican governance. Contarini's writings aimed to glorify the republican nature of Venice while showcasing its ceremonial and symbolic elements.

== Biography ==
He was born in Venice, the eldest son of Alvise Contarini, of the ancient noble House of Contarini, and his wife Polissena Malpiero. After a thorough scientific and philosophical training at the University of Padua, he began his career in the service of his native city. From September 1520 to August 1525 he was the Republic's ambassador to Charles V, with whom Venice was soon at war, instructed to defend the Republic's alliance with Francis I of France. Though he participated at the Diet of Worms, April 1521, he never saw or spoke with Martin Luther. He accompanied Charles in the Netherlands and Spain.

Contarini was in Spain when the Magellan–Elcano circumnavigation returned in 1522, bringing with them a cargo of spices from the East as well as a scientific curiosity. Although the sailors had carefully recorded every day of the three-year journey since they left Seville, the ship's log was one day earlier than the actual date when they returned to Seville. Contarini was the first European to give a correct explanation of this phenomenon. Since the ship had sailed westward around the world, in the same direction as the apparent motion of the sun in the sky, the sailors had experienced one fewer sunrise than a stationary observer.

He participated at the Congress of Ferrara in 1526 as the Republic's representative; at the Congress the League of Cognac was formed against the Emperor, allying France with Venice and several states of Italy. Later, after the Sack of Rome (1527), he assisted in reconciling the emperor with Clement VII, whose release he had obtained, and with the Republic of Bologna. Upon his return to Venice, he was made a senator and a member of the Great Council.

=== Spirituality ===
According to historian Constance Furey, Contarini "was representative of a European-wide phenomenon associated with names such as Erasmus, Thomas More and Lefèvre d'Étaples, people who combined an Erasmian critique of the established church and ritualism with an interest in biblical scholarship as a means of cultivating internal piety," each with no thought of leaving the Catholic church.

In a letter to encourage a missed friend who had become a hermit, Contarini late recounted an event in 1511 where, following Confession with a wise and holy monk, he had a peace-giving epiphany that reliance on penances and heroic asceticism was not necessary for salvation, instead of simple faith, hope and charity: Christ's passion was "more than sufficient." This has been likened by some historians as a similar event to Luther's "tower experience" and some historians even ascribe Lutheran views to Contarini, however the parallels are disputed by other historians.

=== Cardinalate ===
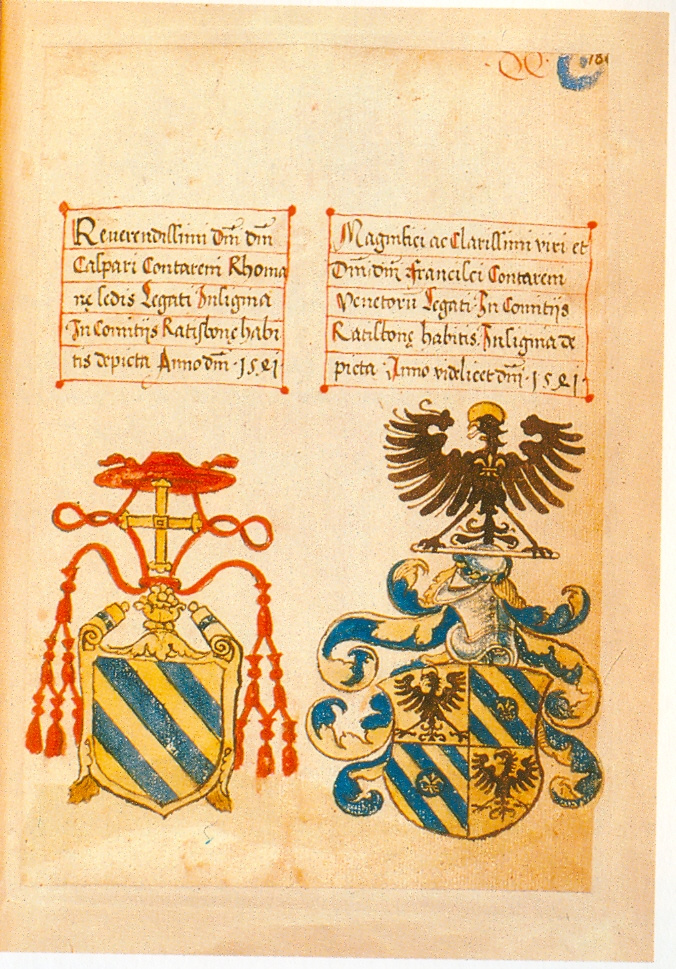
Contarini's coat of arms (left) in the Ingeram Codex

In 1535, Paul III unexpectedly made the secular diplomat a cardinal in order to bind an able man of evangelical disposition to the Roman interests. Contarini accepted, but in his new position did not exhibit his former independence. At the time he was promoted to cardinal, May 21, 1535, he was still a layman. However, already in October 1536 he was appointed Bishop of Belluno. One of the fruits of his diplomatic activity is his De magistratibus et republica Venetorum.

As Cardinal, Contarini figured among the most prominent of the Spirituali, the leaders of the movement for reform within the Roman church. In April 1536 Paul III appointed a commission to devise ways for a reformation, with Contarini presiding. Paul III received favorably Contarini's Consilium de Emendanda Ecclesia, which was circulated among the cardinalate, but it remained a dead letter. Contarini in a letter to his friend Cardinal Reginald Pole (dated 11 November 1538) says that his hopes had been wakened anew by the pope's attitude. He and his friends, who formed the Catholic evangelical movement of the Spirituali, thought that all would have been done when the abuses in church life had been put away. What Contarini had to do with it is shown by his letters to the pope in which he complained of the schism in the church, of simony and flattery in the papal court, and the dangers of a papal fiat monarchy, its least grateful passages. Paul's successor Paul IV, once a member on the same 1536 commission and fellow spirituali, put it on the new Index Librorum Prohibitorum.

In 1541 Cardinal Contarini was papal legate at the Conference of Regensburg, the diet and religious debate marking the culmination of attempts to restore religious unity in Germany by means of conferences. There everything was unfavorable; the Catholic states were bitter, the Evangelicals were distant. Contarini's instructions though apparently free were in fact full of papal reservations. But the papal party had gladly sent him, thinking that through him a union in doctrine could be brought about, while the interest of Rome could be attended to later. Though the princes stood aloof, the theologians and the emperor were for peace, so the main articles were put forth in a formula, Evangelical in thought and Catholic in expression. The papal legate had revised the Catholic proposal and assented to the formula agreed upon. All gave their approval, even Johann Eck, though he later regretted it.

Contarini's theological advisor was Tommaso Badia; his own position is shown in a treatise on justification, composed at Regensburg, which in essential points is Evangelical, differing only in the omission of the negative side and in being interwoven with the teaching of Aquinas. Meanwhile, the papal policy had changed, and Contarini chose to follow this. He advised the emperor, after the conference had broken up, not to renew it, but to submit everything to the pope.

Ignatius Loyola acknowledged that Cardinal Contarini was largely responsible for the papal approbation of the Society of Jesus, on September 27, 1540. Meanwhile, Rome had drifted further into reaction, and Contarini died while legate at Bologna, at a time when the Inquisition had driven many of his friends and fellows in conviction into exile.

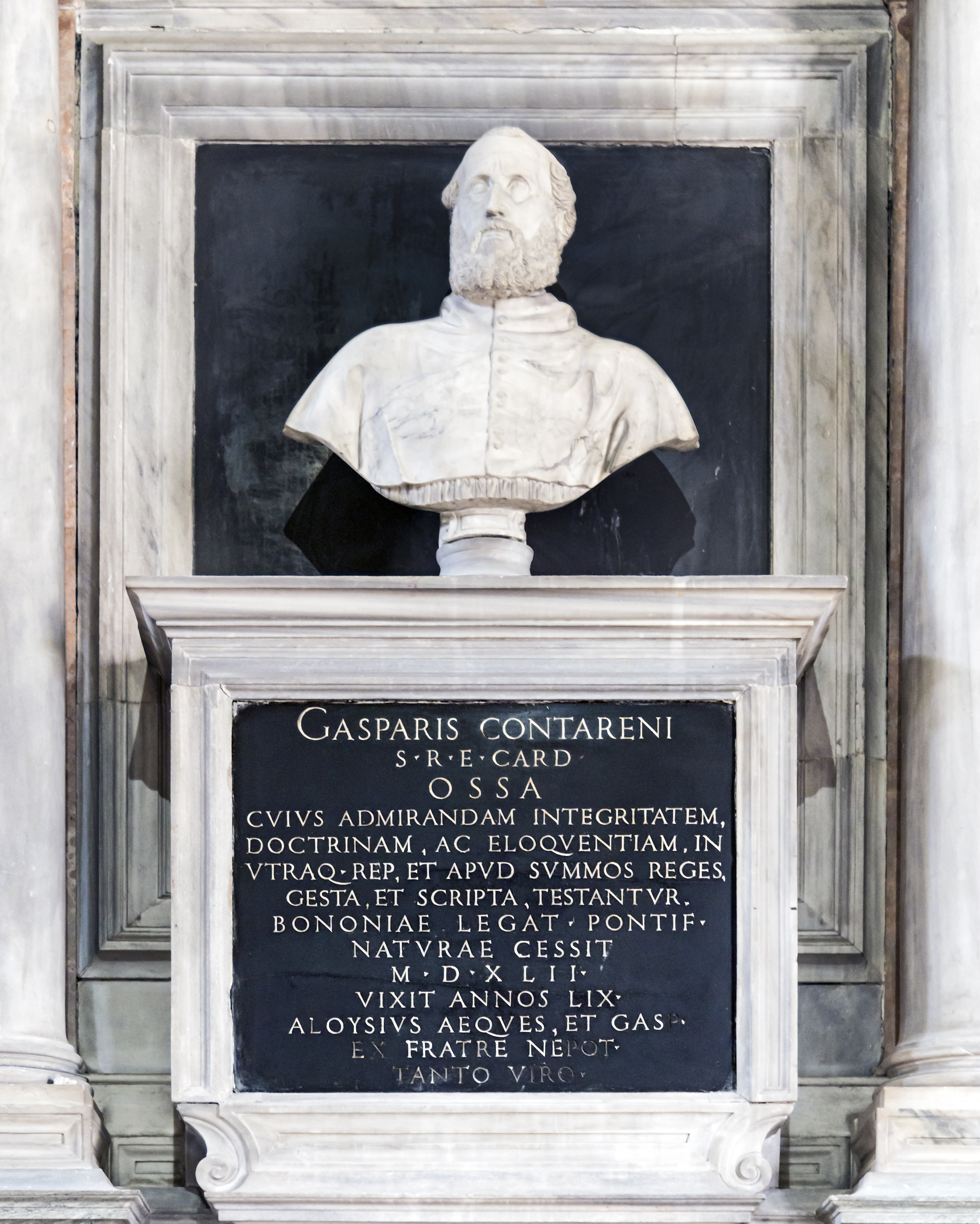
His tomb in the church of the Madonna dell'Orto

== The Commonwealth and Government of Venice ==
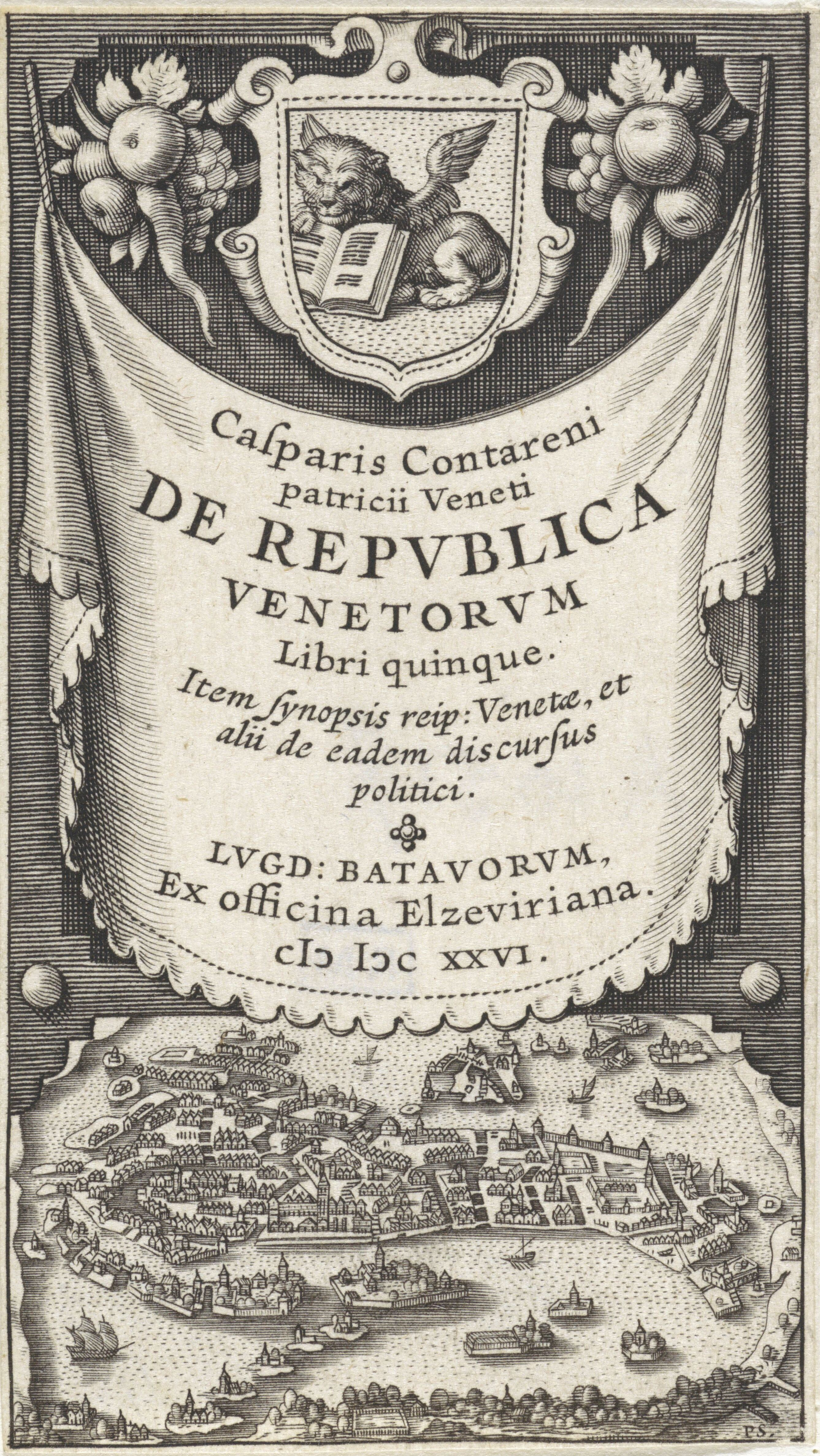
De republica Venetorum, 1626.

Contarini's book De magistratibus et republica venetorum (Paris, 1543) is an important source for the study of sixteenth- and seventeenth-century Venice's unique system of government. It was published in an English translation in 1599. This magisterial work, written during his time as an ambassador to Charles V, extols the various institutions of the Venetian state in a manner designed to emphasize harmony, fairness and serenity. Historians have demonstrated that this text represents Contarini's idealization of Venetian reality. Probably written for a foreign, courtly audience, this work functions as the source for the everlasting propagation of the "myth of Venice" as a stable, unchanging and prosperous society.

His depiction of how members of the council were elected to the senate, for example, aimed to emphasise the way the electoral system prevented factionalism from occurring, instead making sure that “public benefits are largely extended among the citizens” rather than narrowly amongst “one family” . An elaborate lottery is described as giving the maximum amount of chance in appointing patricians to particular offices, and care is taken to point out if two of one family are standing for similar posts. Fairness is further emphasised in Contarini's constant references to the equality the members of the council enjoyed. They “sit down where it pleases them, for there is no place appointed to any”, and they “with oath promise to do their utmost diligence, that the laws may be observed” . He creates an image of disparate individuals, with factions broken up by the guiding hand of the law, working to ensure those in positions of importance are fairly chosen from their number and without the capacity to serve the interests of a smaller group.

Contarini's depiction of the Doge lucidly demonstrates the way in which this figure embodies both the conscious illusion of a resplendent monarchical ruler and an equally conscious demonstration of a regime that wishes to portray itself as ruled by many limiting the powers of one. This calculated duality means that Contarini's doge, which the second book of De magistratibus is almost entirely devoted to discussing, represents the closest point in his text to what actually occurred, because the Doge served as a literal embodiment of the idealisation of the reality of Venetian politics. For Contarini, this duality almost defines the greatness of the Venetian constitution. The Doge is the “heart”, under which “all are comprised” . Contarini places him in the centre of his body metaphor, making him synecdochical for the city and the people that reside within it. This means he is to ensure that the disparate, competing interests of the city beat in time with one another, creating in the process the “perfection of civil agreement”. His job as a conductor, rather than a ruler, means therefore that the role takes on the aspect of representative of the entire city. Contarini's description of his vestments, privileges and rituals can therefore be compared to Marin Sanudo’s description of the physical spaces of Venice in his essay In Praise of Venice. Both are designed to extol the virtues of the entire city by describing representative parts. This is apparent in the way both authors treat the chapel of St. Mark. Patron saints were hugely important in terms of civic self-identification in renaissance Italy . Contarini emphasizes this, saying that he is “with exceeding honour solemnized of the Venetians” . His description of the Doge's close relationship with the saint, through the “solemn pomp” with which he attends mass at the saint's chapel, attaches him to the aforementioned “exceeding honour”, in a similar fashion to the way in which Sanudo glorifies Venice as a whole by constantly referring to the beauty and worth of St. Mark's square and chapel as part of his panoramic praise of the city.

At the same time, however, Contarini's overall purpose is, of course, the glorification of the republican nature of his city. Therefore, he cannot avoid referring to “the other side” of the Doge's figure when discussing his “royal appearing show” . Things like the “kingly ornaments” which were “always purple garments or cloth of gold”, both very ostentatious assertions of wealth and power, were to ensure he was “recompensed” for his “limitation of authority” . Contarini thus openly concludes that the Doge is a combination of myth and reality, saying that “in everything you may see the show of a king, but his authority is nothing” . Indeed, as Edward Muir points out, “by the sixteenth century virtually every word, gesture and act that the doge made in public was subject to legal and ceremonial regulation” . He could not buy expensive jewels, own property outside Venice or the Veneto, display his insignia outside the Ducal Palace, decorate his apartment as he wanted, receive people in his ducal dress, send official letters, or have close ties with guilds, amongst a great many other restrictions. Legally, therefore, power in Venice came from the numerous councils, not the figurehead. The Doge thus becomes a brazen republican statement. Venice drew attention to a princely, magnificently adorned figurehead, only to direct most executive power to councils of her citizens.

== Notes ==
Catholic Church titles
Preceded by Lorenzo Campeggio (administrator)	Administrator of Salisbury (unrecognized by Crown); 1539–1542	Succeeded by William Petow (bishop)
