= Girolamo Bortignon =

Italian prelate

Girolamo Bortignon OFM Cap
- Bishop of Padova
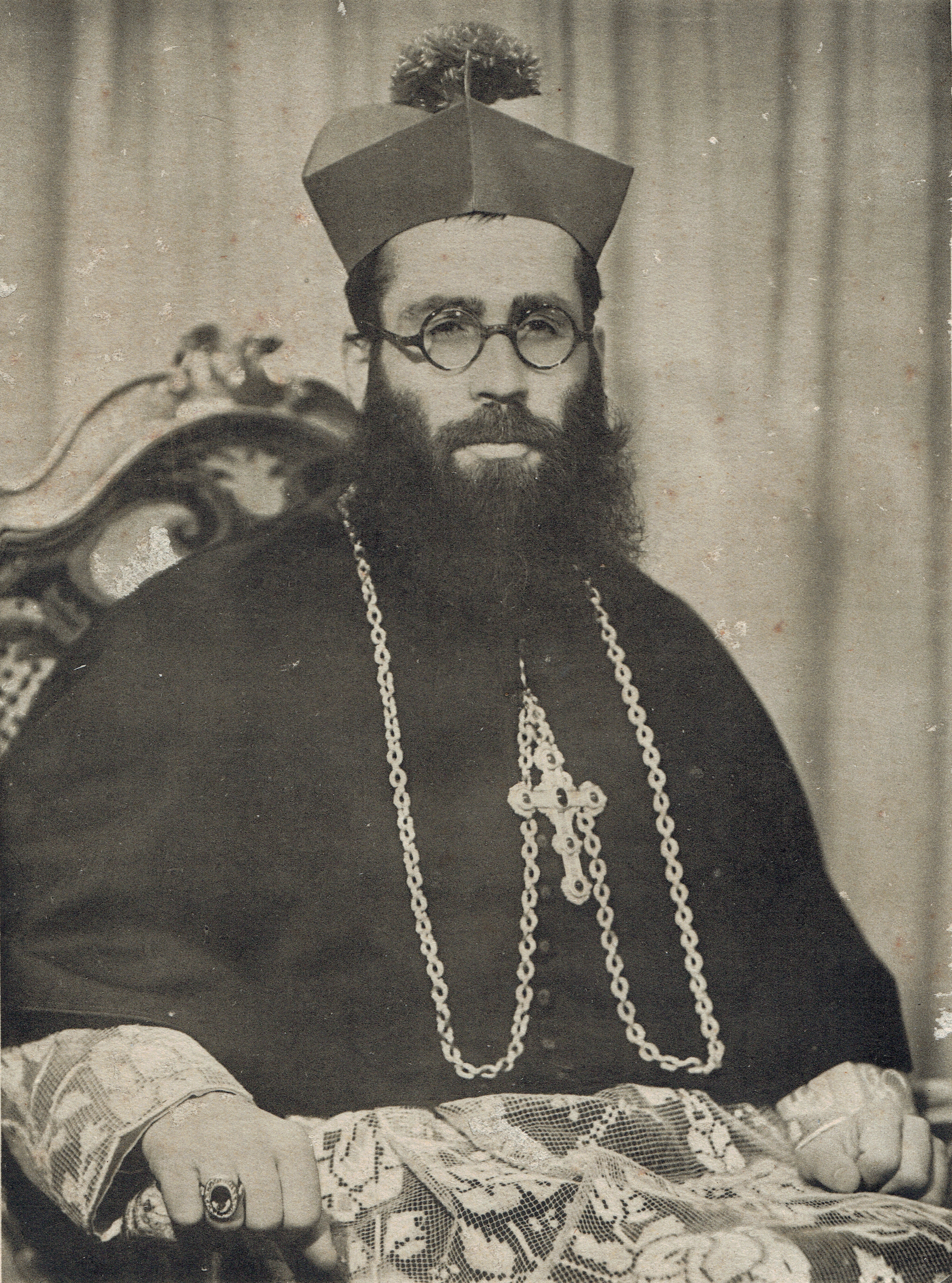
- Portrait of Monsignor Bortignon, c. 1949
- Church: Catholic Church
- Diocese: Diocese of Padua
- In office: 1 April 1949 – 7 January 1982
- Predecessor: Carlo Agostini
- Successor: Filippo Franceschi
- Previous posts: Bishop of Belluno e Feltre (1945-1949); Titular Bishop of Lydda (1944-1945); Apostolic Administrator of Belluno e Feltre (1944-1945)

Orders
- Ordination: 3 March 1928
- Consecration: 14 May 1944 by Adeodato Giovanni Piazza

Personal details
- Born: Girolamo Bartolomeo Bortignon; 31 March 1905 Fellette di Romano d'Ezzelino, Province of Vicenza, Kingdom of Italy
- Died: 12 March 1992 (aged 86)

Styles of Girolamo Bartolomeo Bortignon
- Reference style: The Most Reverend
- Spoken style: Your Excellency
- Religious style: Monsignor
- Posthumous style: none

Girolamo Bartolomeo Bortignon, OFM Cap (31 March 1905 – 12 March 1992) was an Italian friar and prelate of the Roman Catholic Church, serving as Bishop of Padua from 1949 to 1982 and Bishop of Belluno e Feltre from 1945 to 1949.

== Biography ==
Born in Romano d'Ezzelino, he was ordained as a Capuchin priest on 3 March 1928, at the age of 22.

On 4 April 1944 he was appointed apostolic administrator of Belluno e Feltre and Titular Bishop of Lydda by Pope Pius XII. Bortignon received his episcopal consecration from Cardinal Adeodato Giovanni Piazza, OCD, on the following 14 May. He later replaced Giosuè Cattarossi as Bishop of Belluno e Feltre on 9 September 1945. In 1947, he named Fr. Albino Luciani as his pro-vicar general. When Pope John XXIII asked Bortignon for a name for Bishop of Vittorio Veneto years later, the latter offered his old vicar general in Belluno, saying, "I know him ... He will do me fine." After almost five years, Bortignon was translated to Bishop of Padua on 1 April 1949.

In 1960, he told his Vatican connections that the activities surrounding Padre Pio at San Giovanni Rotondo should merit an investigation. Bortignon attended the Second Vatican Council from 1962 to 1965.

He once served as the Vatican's preacher of spiritual exercises and as vice-president of the Triveneto regional Episcopal Conference.

The Capuchin bishop resigned his post in Padua on 7 January 1982, after thirty-two years of service. He later died at age 86.

Catholic Church titles
Preceded by Giosuè Cattarossi	Bishop of Belluno-Feltre; 1945–1949	Succeeded by Gioacchino Muccin
Preceded by Carlo Agostini	Bishop of Padua; 1949–1982	Succeeded by Filippo Franceschi
