= Palazzo Crepadona =

The Palazzo Crepadona is a medieval palace, presently used as a cultural center including a civic library (Biblioteca Civica di Belluno) and display halls in the historic center of Belluno, region of Veneto, Italy.

== Description ==
The abandoned palace was acquired by the comune in 1973. In 1981, in project designed and directed by Mario Dal Mas, was converted into a cultural center. The building is derived from a set of adjacent medieval buildings, united to form an urban fortress. The houses surrounding the courtyard were joined together in 1558, as documented in the central fountain. The interiors contain a number of frescoes, dating from the 14th through the 16th-century.

The civic collections include the decorated third century Roman Sarcophagus of Gaio Flavio Ostilio Sertoriano and his wife Domizia discovered under the church of San Stefano in 1480. The reading room of the library displays 13 works by Masi Simonetti (Zoppé di Cadore 1903 – Paris 1967). The palace's chapel has a fresco mural by the Franciscan Ugolino da Belluno (Belluno 1919- Roma 2002).

Among the library collections are works by the musician Antonio Miari (Belluno 1777- Landris di Sedico 1854) and the soprano Giovanni Battista Velluti (Corridonia 1780 – Sambruson di Dolo 1861); the humanists Andrea Alpago (Belluno 1450 – Padua 1522), Urbano Bolzanio (Belluno 1442 – Venice 1524), and Giovanni Pierio Valeriano (Belluno 1477 – Padua 1558). The collection also acquired the library of the Piloni family which had works by Cesare Vecellio, cousin of Titian.

Among recent exhibitions are:

- Marco Ricci e il paesaggio veneto del Settecento (1993)
- Capolavori della pittura veneta dal Castello di Prague (1994)
- Da Van Gogh a Picasso. Capolavori del disegno francese del XIX e XX secolo. Da Corot a Monet. Opere impressioniste e post-impressioniste dalla Johannesburg Art Gallery (2003)
- A nord di Venezia. Scultura e pittura delle vallate dolomitiche tra Gotico e Rinascimento (2004)
- Caffi (Ippolito Caffi). Luci del Mediterraneo (2005)
- Titian. Belluno L’ultimo atto (2007)
- Andrea Brustolon (2009)
- Sebastiano Ricci tra le sue Dolomiti (2010)
- Pop art e oggetto: artisti italiani degli anni Sessanta (1996)
- Arte povera e dintorni nel 1997)
- La citazione: arte in Italia negli anni ’70 e ‘80 (1998)
- Alle soglie del 2000: arte in Italia negli anni ‘90 (1999)
- Buzzati 1969: il laboratorio di Poema a fumetti (2002)
- Premio artista dell’anno (2000-2006) with works by Luigi Ontani, Carla Accardi, Botto e Bruno, Mimmo Rotella, Sissi, Enzo Cucchi, and Agostino Bonalumi,
