= Silvia Zenari =

Italian botanist

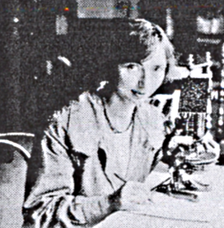

Silvia Zenari (31 March 1895 – 30 June 1956) was an Italian geologist and botanist. Zenari was born in Udine, Italy and studied at the University of Padua, graduating in 1918. Zenari studied the Dolomites in Belluno, Cadore, and Comelico between 1930 and 1950, eventually turning her focus to botany as well as geology. She was the first person to complete a study on the ecology of plant life at high elevations, primarily in the Sexten Dolomites range. She later moved on to studying the Schiara range, including Monte Serva. Zenari published a monograph entitled Contributo alla conoscenza della flora del Comelico (alto Cadore): note di critica sistematica, which described various groups of organisms in the Comelico region. Zenari's work on vegetation in the Dolomites was the last significant phytosociological research completed in the Dolomites for thirty years. Zenari later went on to become a Professor of Systemic Botany at University of Padua in Padua.

== Life ==
Silvia Zenari was born on 31 March 1895. Zenari was born in Udine, Italy. Her father was an engineer, and was involved in the construction of hydroelectric power generators at Valcelina. Zensri attended the Vittorio Veneto, and the gymnasium and lyceum in Padova, before entering the University of Padua. She graduated from the university in 1918, having studied geology and mineralogy.

Zenari was a geologist and botanist. While working for the Istituto di Geologia, Zenari studied the Dolomites in Belluno, Cadore, and Comelico between 1930 and 1950, eventually turning her focus on botany as well as geology. She was the first to complete a study on the ecology of plant life at high elevations, primarily in the Sexten Dolomites range. She later moved on to studying the Schiara range, including Monte Serva. Her research included a statistical analysis of plants at various elevations, which explained the distribution of various species. In 1942 Zenari published a monograph entitled Contributo alla conoscenza della flora del Comelico (alto Cadore): note di critica sistematica, which described various groups of organisms in the Comelico region. Zenari's work on vegetation in the Dolomites was the last significant phytosociological research completed in the Dolomites for thirty years. Zenari later went on to become a Professor of Systemic Botany at University of Padua in Padua.

Zenari died on 30 June 1956 in a car accident.

The standard author abbreviation Zenari is used to indicate this person as the author when citing a botanical name.
