= Belluno Cathedral =

Cathedral in Belluno, Veneto, Italy

Coordinates: 46.1377°N 12.2170°E

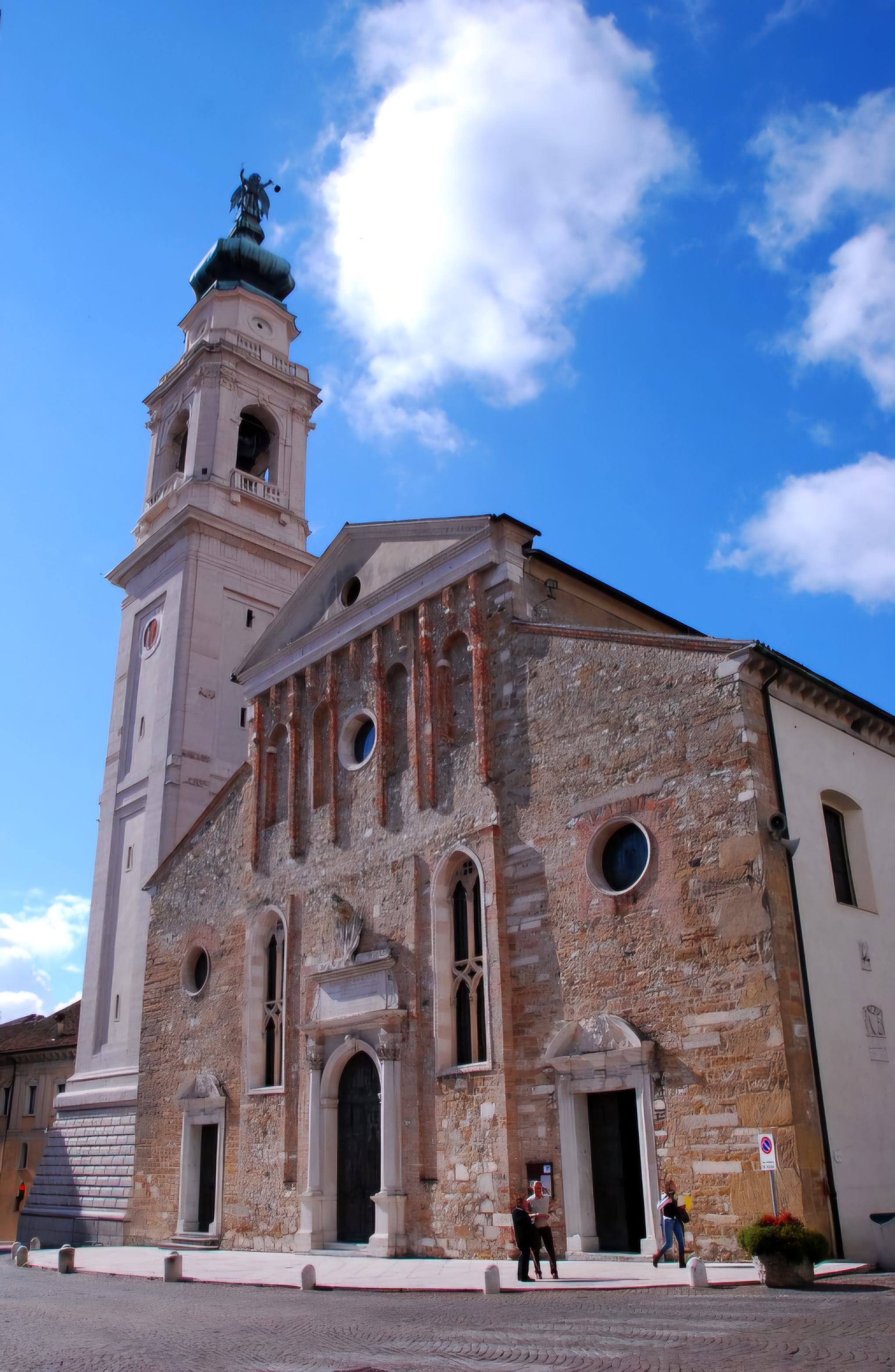
Belluno Cathedral: west front and campanile

Belluno Cathedral (Italian: Duomo di Belluno, Basilica cattedrale di San Martino) is a Roman Catholic cathedral in the historic centre of the city of Belluno, Veneto, Italy, dedicated to Saint Martin. It is the episcopal seat of the diocese of Belluno-Feltre. It was elevated to the status of a minor basilica on 18 June 1980 by Pope John Paul II.

== Construction ==
The present cathedral stands on the site of a palaeo-Christian church. A subsequent church dedicated to Saint Martin and built in around in 850 is documented. The present building was built between 1517 and 1624, to plans by the architect Tullio Lombardo, in the style of the Renaissance. The cupola was completed only in 1756. The campanile dates from the 18th century and is by Filippo Juvarra.

== Description ==
=== Exterior ===
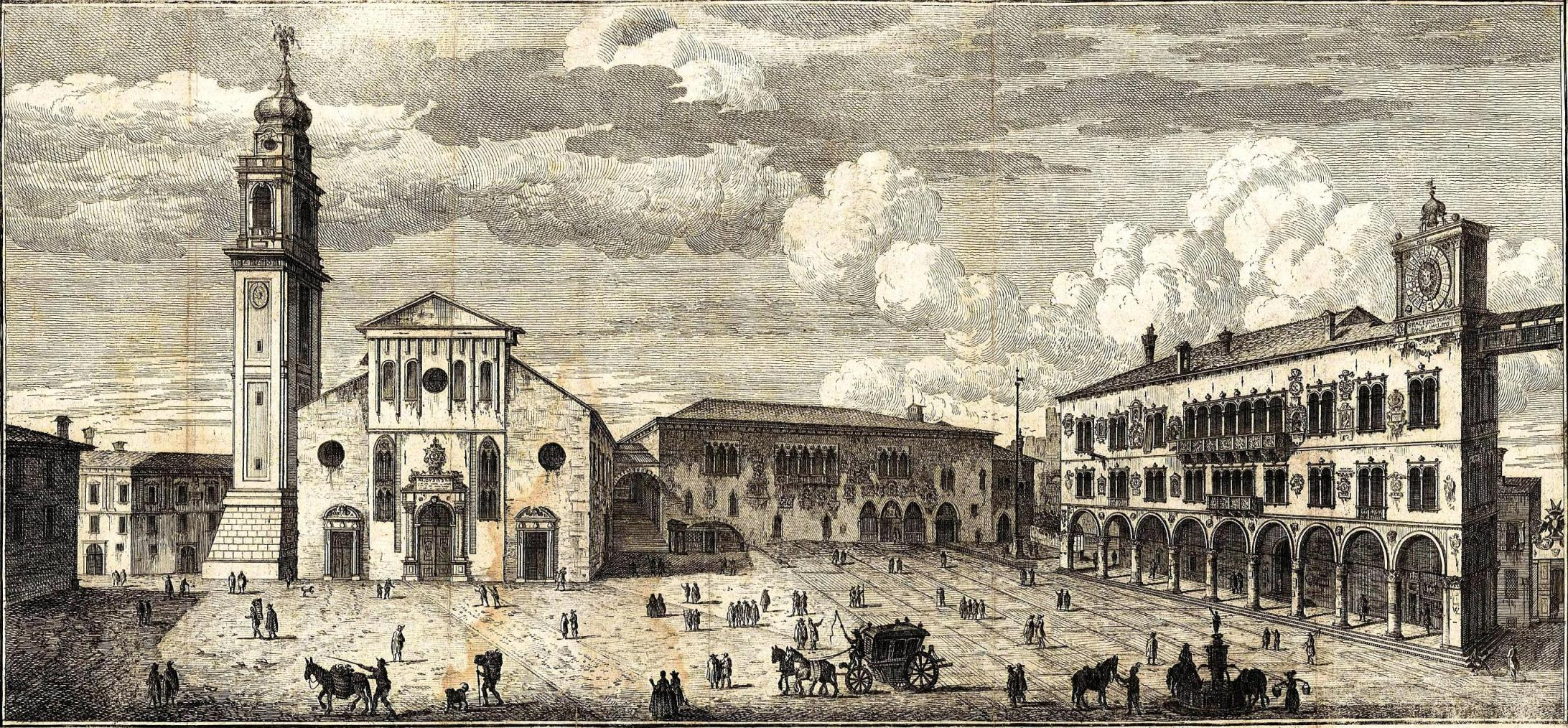
Engraving of the cathedral and the Piazza del duomo in 1750, by Tommaso Salmon

The unfinished west front is of stone, divided vertically into three, between two lower wings. The lower part contains a rich Baroque portal and two Gothic windows, while the upper part, terminating in a tympanum which rests on an entablature delineated by lesene, contains a central rose window, the glass of which depicts figures of Saint Gioatà, Saint Lucanus and Saint Martin.

=== Interior ===
The interior of the cathedral, majestic in appearance, has Renaissance lines even if the height of the pilasters tends more to the Gothic. There are three naves of six spans. The presbytery has triple rows of stalls. The cupola is airy and light. The semi-circular apse contains a fresco by Antonio Ermolao Paoletti of a triumphal Assumption. Among the works by distinguished artists kept in the cathedral, two paintings by Gaspare Diziani stand out for the complexity of their composition: Saints Charles Borromeo, Francis de Sales, Cajetan and Andrew Avellino and the Conversion of St Paul. An altar in the northern nave is decorated by a painting by Egidio Dall'Oglio depicting the Holy Family. The organ, dating from 1946, is by Mascioni.

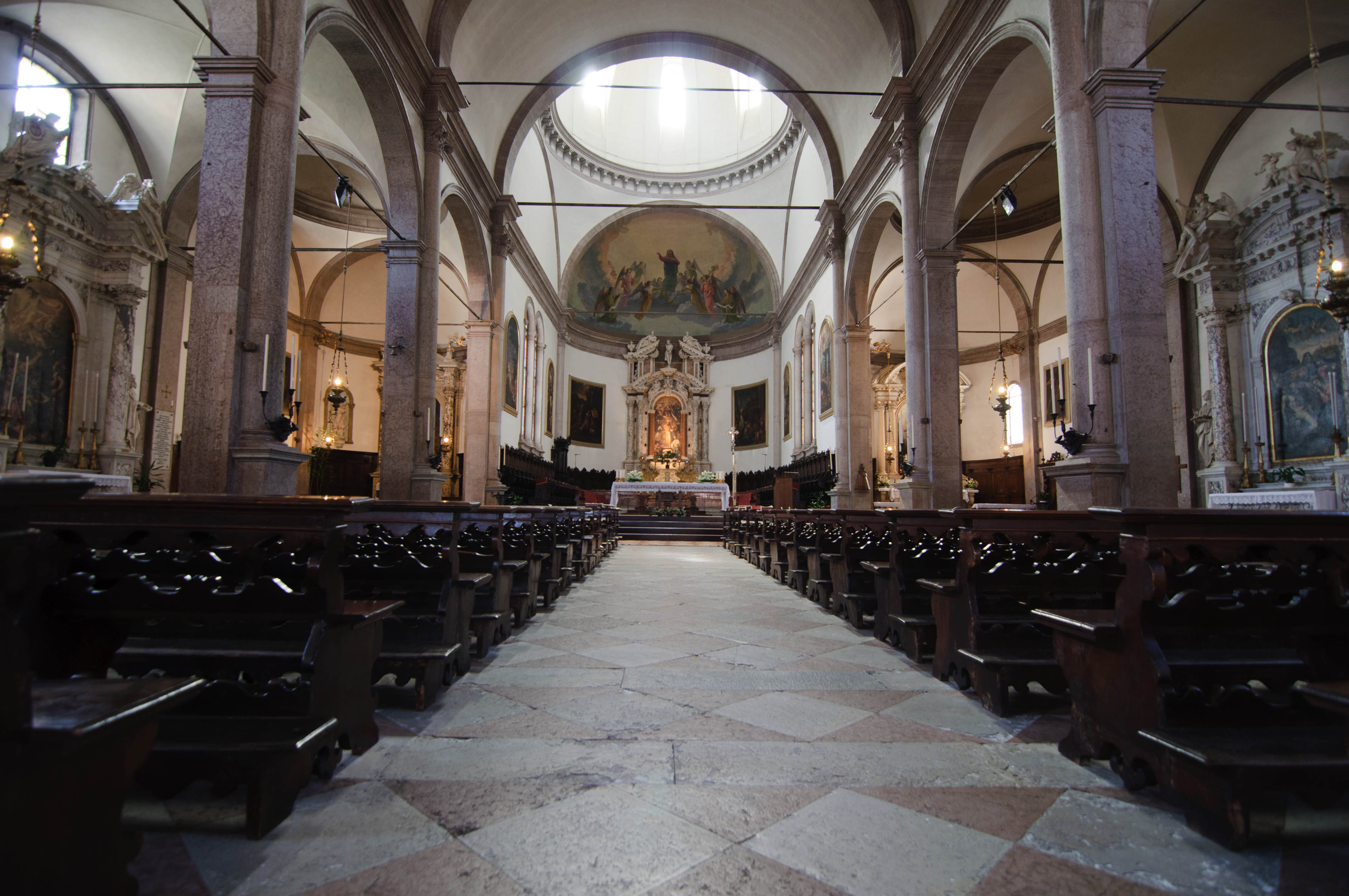
Interior

=== Campanile ===
The Baroque campanile, built between 1732 and 1743, stands at the exit from the sacristy. It was designed by the Messinese architect Filippo Juvarra. Including the angel on the top it is 71.98 metres high. The angel, of wood covered in copper, by Andrea Brustolon, is 4.63 metres high.

== Sources and external links ==
- Diocesan website: Belluno Cathedral (in Italian)
- Basilica cattedrale (in Italian)
