= Santo Stefano, Belluno =

Church building in Belluno, Italy

Santo Stefano is a Roman Catholic, Gothic-style parish church in Belluno, region of Veneto, Italy.

== History ==
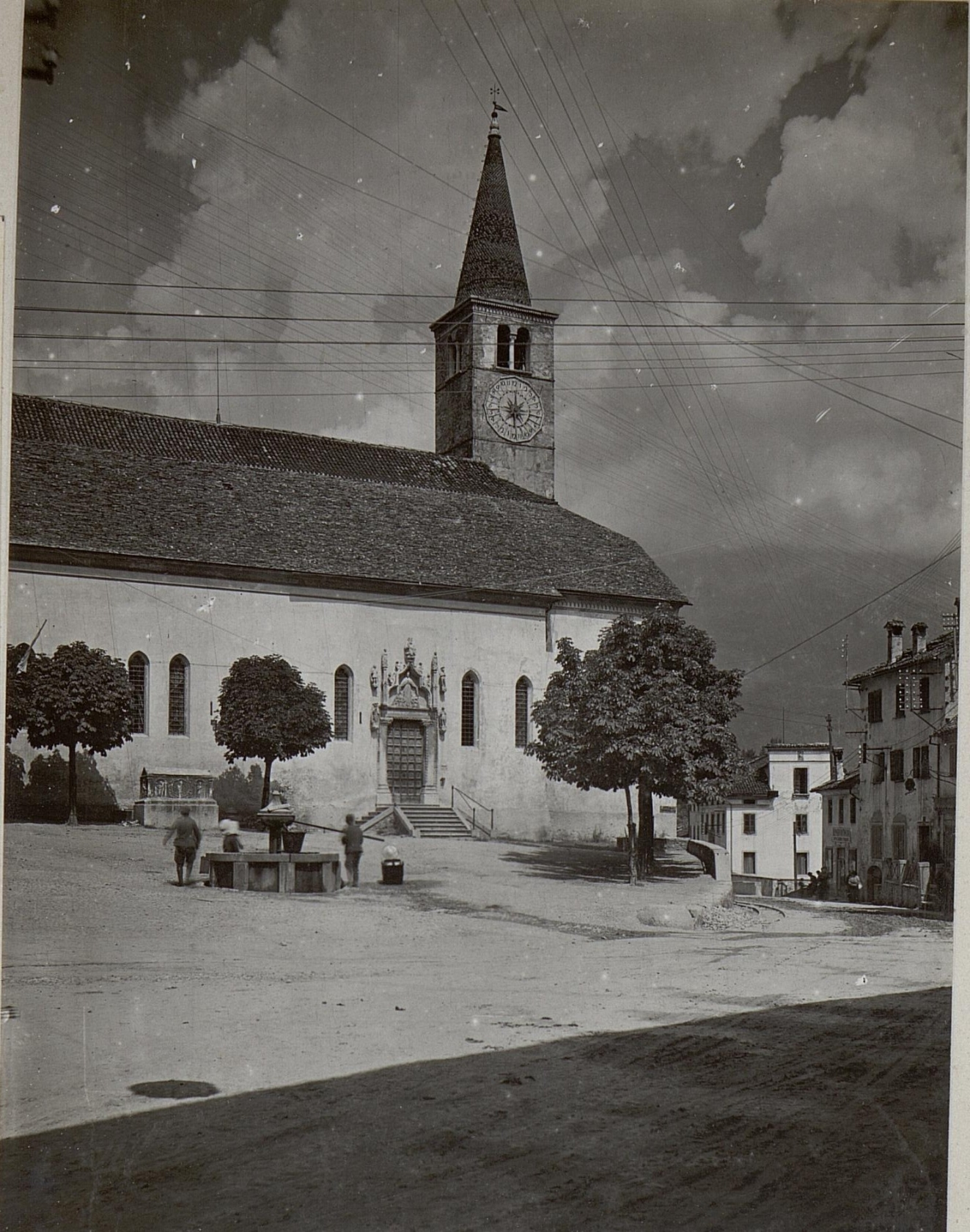
View of the church

The first church at the site was dedicated to Santa Maria della Gracie, but rededicated and built in 1486. The main altarpiece depicting a Baptism of Jesus is by followers of Titian. Along the nave are canvases by Cesare Vecellio depicting Abraham, Melchisedec and the Venetian Podesta Marcantonio Cornaro; attributed to Leonardo Corona is a Mannah in the Desert with Podesta Marco Giustiniano; and the presbytery has two life-size angels sculpted in wood by Andrea Brustolon. Some of the works were moved here from other suppressed churches. The altarpiece dedicated to St Anthony Abbot was painted by Nicolò de Stefani. The altar of the Virgin of the Rosary has a crucifix by Brustoloni and paintings by Francesco Frigimelica. Other works include: Carrying the Cross and a Deposition from the Cross by Antonio Lazzarini.

The piazza in front, once displayed a sarcophagus of a Roman cavalry officer, Caius Flavius Hostilius found under the choir of the present church. The sarcophagus is now on display in the civic museum of Palazzo Crepadona.
