= Bolzano (disambiguation) =

Bolzano is the capital city of South Tyrol, Italy.

Bolzano may also refer to:

- Bernard Bolzano (1781–1848), German-speaking mathematician
- Bolzano Bellunese, a hamlet of Belluno, in Veneto, Italy
- Bolzano Novarese, a commune in the Province of Novara, Italy
- Bolzano Vicentino, a commune in the Province of Vicenza, Italy
- Italian cruiser Bolzano, World War II-era Trento-class heavy cruiser

== See also ==
- Urbano Bolzanio, (1442–1524), Italian humanist
