= Cesa (surname) =

Cesa is an Italian surname. Notable people with the surname include:

- Lorenzo Cesa (born 1951), Italian politician
- Maurizio Vitale Cesa (1945–1987), Italian entrepreneur and sportswear inventor
- Matteo Cesa (c. 1425 – after 1491), Italian late-gothic style artist
- Mirella Cesa (born 1984), Ecuadorian singer
- Nicolò Cesa-Bianchi (born 1963), Italian computer scientist and professor of computer science

== See also ==
- Cesa (disambiguation)
