= Matteo Cesa =

Italian painter

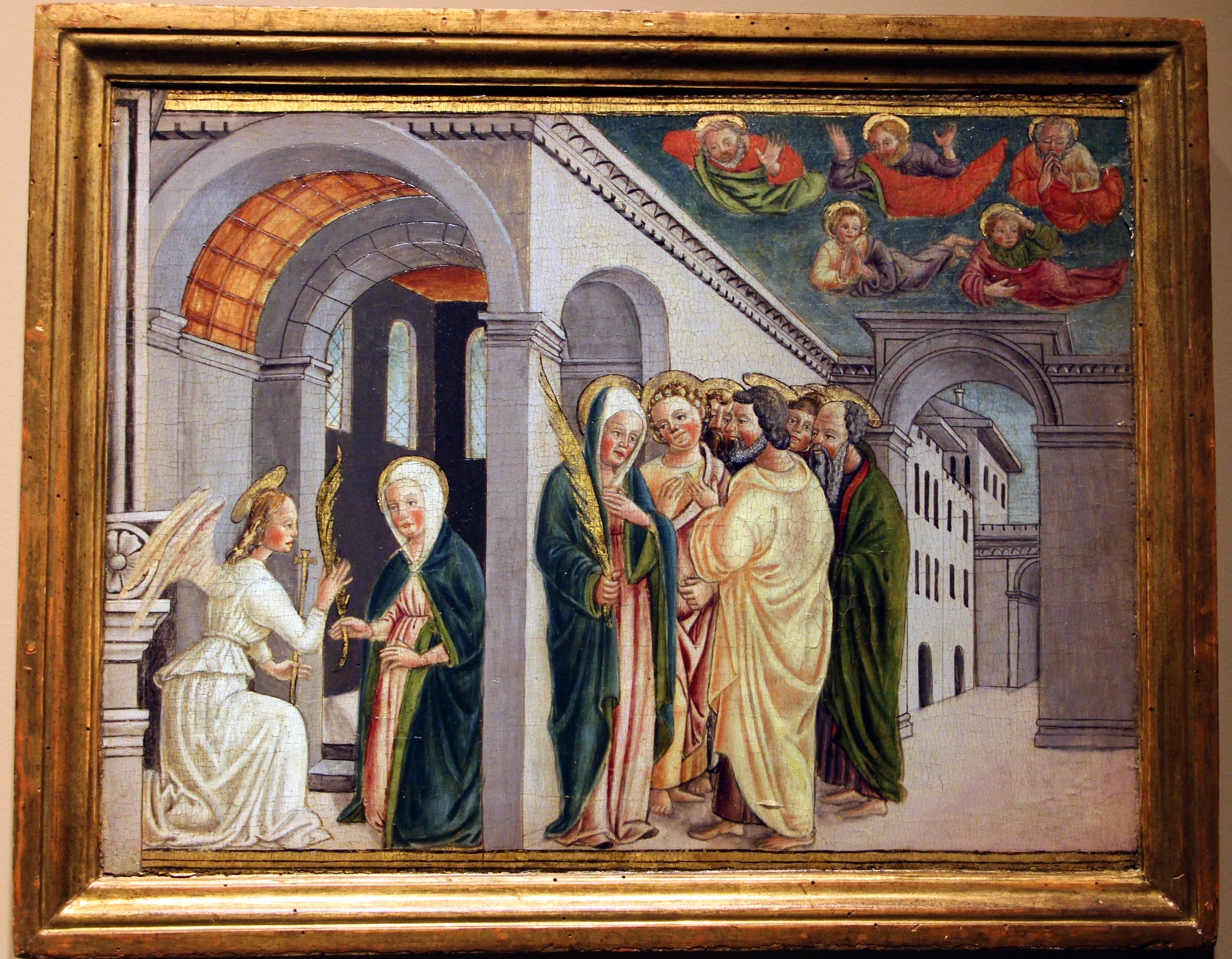
- Journey to Bethlehem and birth of Christ, 1480-85 ca
- Born: Matteo Cesa; 1425 c. Belluno
- Died: 1495 c. Belluno
- Known for: Painting

Matteo Cesa or de Cesa (c. 1425 – c. 1495) was a late-gothic style artist living in Belluno, Italy. He shows the influence of painters of the Vivarini clan. His son, Antonio, was also a painter.

Among his works:

- Virgin and Child, with Saints and Angels (carved work), Santo Stefano, Belluno
- Virgin and Child between SS. Matthew and Jerome, San Matteo, Belluno
