= Lucanus of Sabiona =

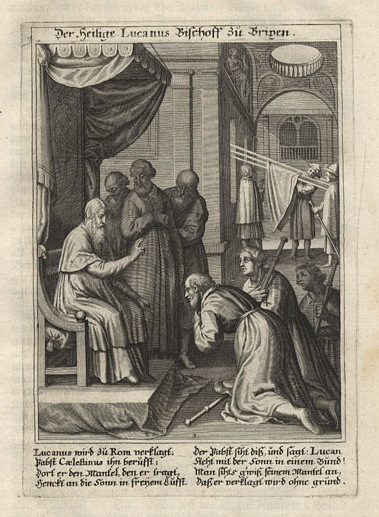
Lucanus kneeling before Pope Celestine I to receive his blessing. In the background his cloak hangs up to dry from a sunbeam (copper engraving, 1714)

Saint Lucanus of Sabiona or Lucanus of Säben (Italian: San Lucano or Lugano; German: Lukan von Säben; fl. 5th century; died 20 July), is a Roman Catholic saint of the fifth century, associated with the Dolomites and the Tyrol.

He is often described as bishop of Säben, and later—erroneously—as bishop of Brixen in the South Tyrol.

== Legend ==
Lucanus is scarcely known outside the immediate area of his labours and much that is said of him is legendary.

He is said to have been a bishop of Säben, earlier Sabiona, above Klausen, in the first half of the 5th century (the bishops moved to Brixen in the 10th century).

During a famine he allowed the consumption in his bishopric during the forty days' fast of Lent of milk, butter and cheese if they could be obtained. For this his enemies denounced him in the year 424 before Pope Celestine I, who ordered him to Rome. Lucanus set out, despite his advanced age, accompanied by a single servant. On the way his horse was killed and eaten by a bear: Lucanus commanded the bear in the name of God to take the horse's place, and then saddled and bridled it and rode it to Rome.

Stopping overnight at an inn in Spoleto, Lucanus discovered that the landlord's wife was bedridden with dropsy, and cured her by praying at her bedside.

He continued to Rome, and ordered a flock of partridges to fly ahead of him to the Pope as a gift, since he had nothing suitable to give him. When he arrived in Rome for his audience he wanted to take off his cloak, which was wet from the rain, but found nowhere to hang it, so threw it over a ray of sunshine, which supported it. When the Pope saw that Lucanus was in grace he declared him innocent and allowed him to return home with his blessing and rich presents.

On his return, however, Lucanus was driven from Säben by his enemies and took refuge in the valley of Agordo in the modern Italian province of Belluno. There he was given food by a woman called Avatia (who was also venerated as a saint by the church in the valley). He became famous on account of his many miracles, and died there on a 20 July. His head was kept in Agordo, while his body was kept in a marble coffin in Belluno Cathedral.

At the beginning of the 16th century an account of his life was compiled by the public notary of Belluno, Peter Paul von Diolaitis, although he did not give his sources.

== Cult ==
Carl Pfaundler wrote in his book (published in 1843) Heiliger Tyroler-Ehrenglanz oder Lebensgeschichten — heiliger, seliger, gottseliger, frommer und ausgezeichneter Tyroler concerning the veneration of Lucanus to the following effect:

In Brixen up to the early 17th century little or nothing was known of Lucanus: the old lists of bishops and other liturgical books of the region made no mention of him.

Only after 1621, and after Bishop Hieronymus Otto Agricola had repeatedly re-published the breviary of Brixen of 1604, was Lucanus counted among the patron saints of Brixen Cathedral and officially venerated there. He had however for some considerable time previously been venerated in the church of Belluno as bishop of Säben.

His cult grew after 1658, when Anton von Crosini, bishop of Brixen, sent Canon Johann Andreas von Rossi to Belluno in order to acquire some relics from Lucanus's grave for Brixen. With the agreement of the Doge and High Council of Venice as well as of the administrator and members of the council of Belluno, von Rossi took a shoulder-blade and a rib, with which he returned to Brixen on 3 October 1658. The relics were kept initially in the church of the Capuchins in Brixen until the following Sunday, 6 October, when they were solemnly translated to their resting-place in Brixen Cathedral. The feast day was established on 20 July, but only for the town of Brixen, not for the whole diocese. The relics were publicly venerated every year on this day, and sometimes also carried in processions with the relics of the other saints of the cathedral.

In 1814 the relics of Lucanus were given new containers in the same form as the containers of the relics of patron saints of the diocese, Saints Ingenuin, Albuin and Hartmann.

The bones of Lucanus remain today in Belluno Cathedral and in Brixen.

== Patronage ==
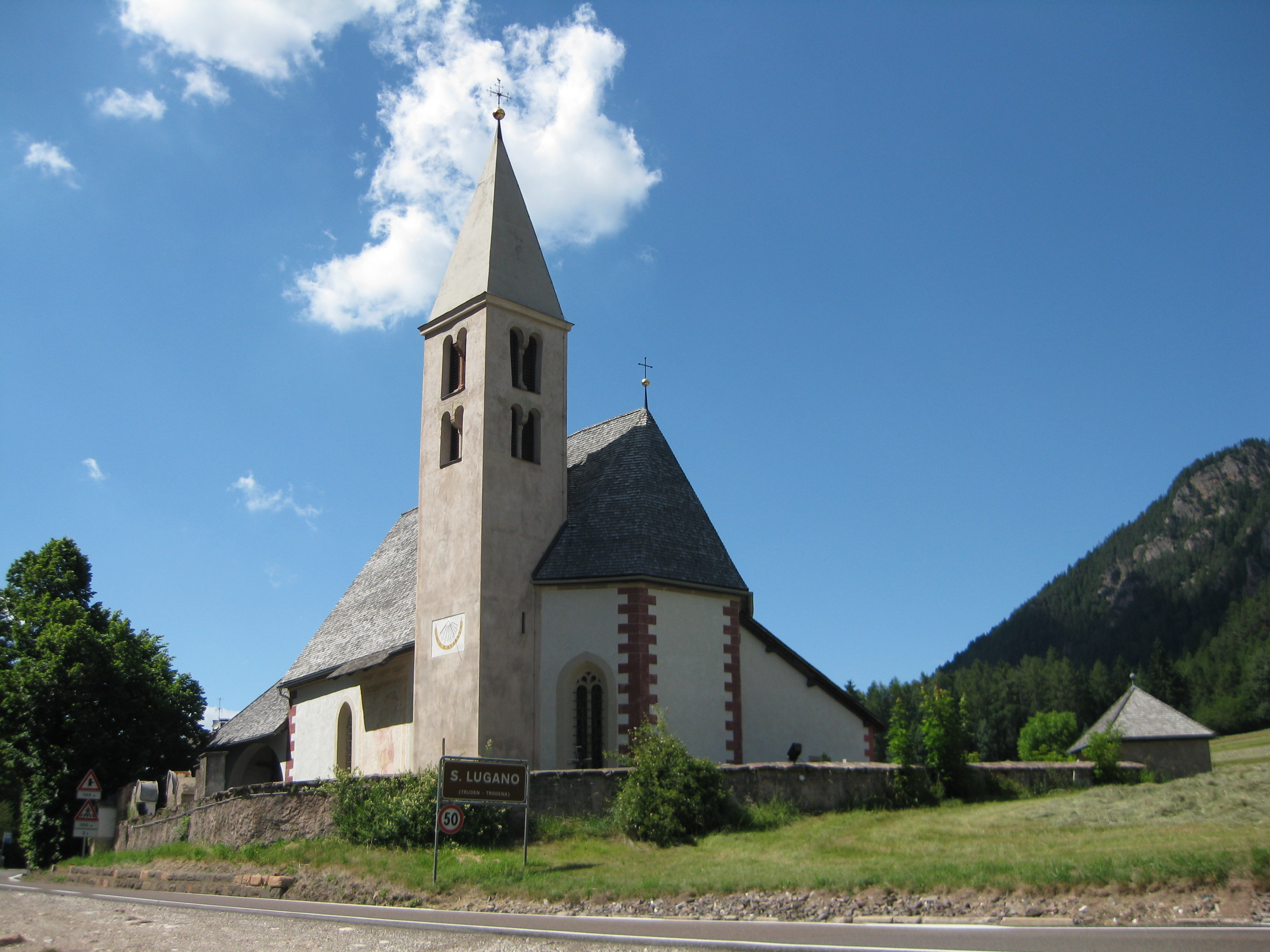
Parish church of St. Lycanus in San Lugano (Truden) in the South Tyrol

Lucanus is invoked as a protector against dropsy.

San Lugano (in Truden) in the South Tyrol is named after him, and the parish church of Sankt Lukan is dedicated to him. In the diocese of Belluno-Feltre there at least two churches dedicated to him (San Lucano or San Lugano).

The San Lugano Pass, the Alpine pass from the Etschtal into the Fleimstal and a valley near Agordo bear his name, as he is supposed to have stopped there both before and after his flight.

== Iconography ==
The saint is represented with a mitre and with a cloak hanging to dry on a sunbeam.

He is also shown riding a bear. This motif also occurs in the legends of Saints Romedius and Corbinian, who were active in geographical areas very close by,

His feast days are 20 July and 27 July.

== Other ==
He is not the same as the French Saint Lucanus of Loigny (also Lucian, Lucain, Lucien), of Loigny in Beauce. The French saint similarly lived in the 5th century but died a martyr by being beheaded; his feast day is 30 October. His relics are now in the cathedral of Notre-Dame, Paris.

The name of the well-known place Lugano in Ticino, Switzerland, is not derived from this saint.

== Sources ==
- Philipp Ferrarius, Verzeichnis der Heiligen von Italien (Resch, Annal. Sab. I. Pag. 269) (in German)
- Carl Pfaundler (1843), Heiliger Tyroler-Ehrenglanz oder Lebensgeschichten — heiliger, seliger, gottseliger, frommer und ausgezeichneter Tyroler (etc.) (in German), vol. 1, Innsbruck: Carl Pfaundler
