= Pierio Valeriano Bolzani =

Italian humanist

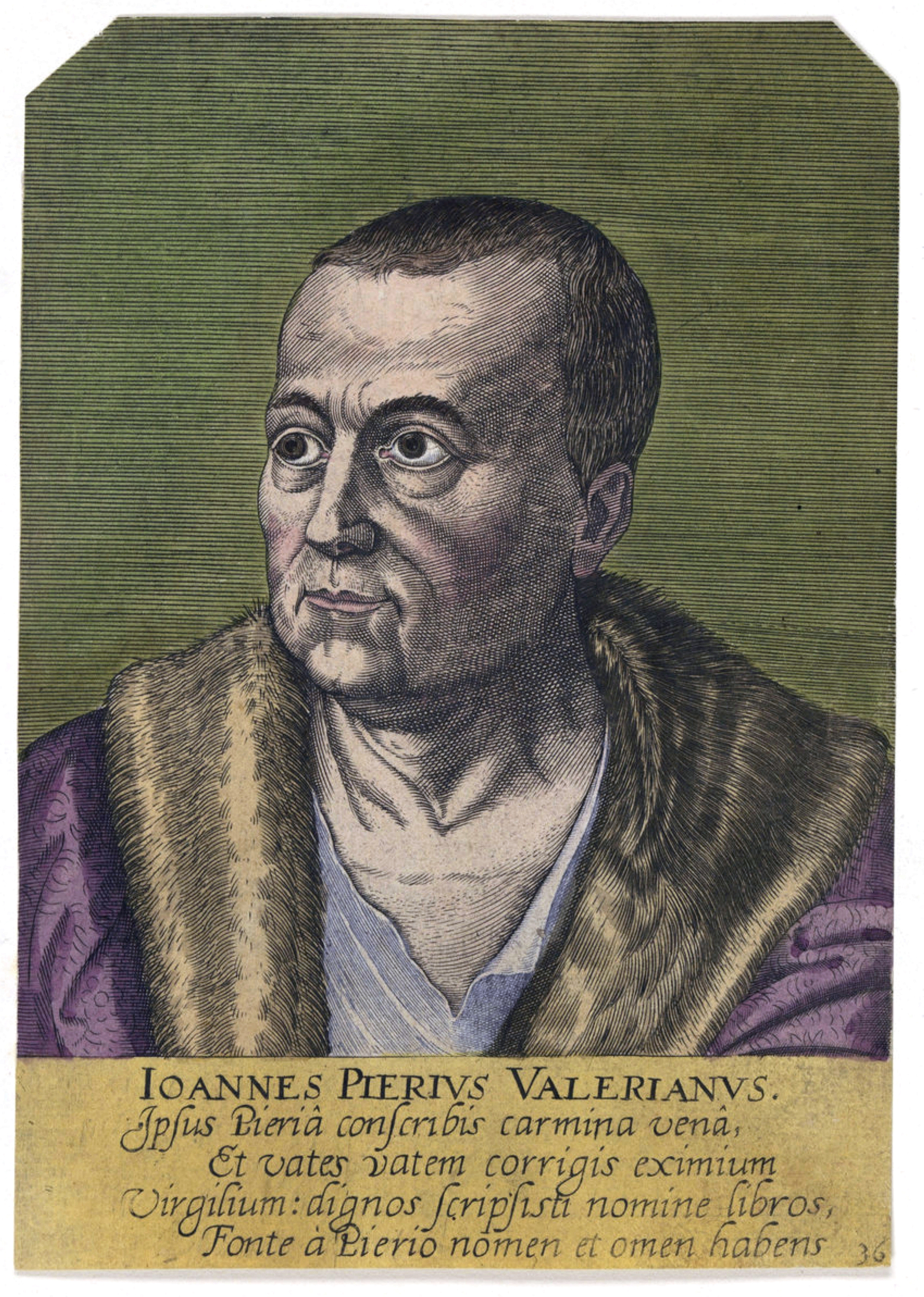
Pierio Valeriano Bolzani

Pierio Valeriano (3 February 1477 – 18 June 1558), born Giovanni Pietro dalle Fosse, was an Italian Renaissance humanist, specializing in the early study of Egyptian hieroglyphs. His most famous works were On the Ill Fortune of Learned Men (De litteratorum infelicitate) and Hieroglyphica, sive, De sacris Aegyptiorvm literis commentarii, a study on hieroglyphics and their use in allegory.

== Early life (1477–1509) ==
Valeriano was born in Belluno, Italy, on 2 February 1477 to a poor family. His father, Lorenzo, was a craftsman who died around 1492, leaving a widow and four children in poverty with a young Valeriano as head of the household.

He began his schooling in Belluno at the public school of Giosippo Faustino, a man who Valeriano would later describe as a gifted and talented teacher. Valeriano remembered his schooling fondly, but constantly felt the burden of supporting his family. Around 1493, Valeriano was brought to Venice by his uncle Fra Urbano Bolzanio, a well-connected Franciscan friar and authority on the Greek language. Bolzanio taught the young Valeriano Greek, and made it possible for him to study under some of Venice's finest teachers at the time including Giorgio Valla and Marcantinio Sabellico. It was Sabellico that changed Valeriano's name in honor of the Pierian Muses. Around 1500 he moved to Padua to study under Leonico Tomeo. Here, through the connections of his uncle, Valeriano met and tutored the son of the future Doge of Venice, Andrea Gritti. From 1500 to 1506, Valeriano divided his time between Padua and Venice, making important contacts such as the Ambassador of France, Ianus Lascaris and becoming firmly entrenched in Venice's scholarly circles. This time allowed him to start tuition from his uncle on his travels through the Near East. It is known that he became particularly interested by his uncle's discussions of Egyptian hieroglyphics. It was here that Valeriano also became friends with and employed by Aldo Manuzio.

== Time in Rome (1509–1531) ==
In 1506 he moved to Olivé near Verona staying there until 1509 when the War of the League of Cambrai made Valeriano a refugee, forcing him to relocate to Rome. Soon after arriving in Rome, Valeriano made friends with Egidio di Viterbo, who would support his work on hieroglyphics and introduce him to powerful intellectual circles.

In October 1509 Pope Julius II named Valeriano parish priest of Limana, a position held by Valeriano's maternal uncle, gaining him a small income. From 1509 to 1513, Valeriano struggled to gain a foothold in Rome after failing to impress both Pope Julius and Emperor Maximilian. Despite this failure, his efforts to gain patronage of the Emperor allowed his work to attain interest from Trans-Alpine humanists.

Valeriano's fortunes changed following the election of Giovanni de Medici, a former pupil of his uncle Urbano, as Pope Leo X in 1513. Because of his connection to the new pope, Valeriano was soon invited to tutor his nephews including the young Ippolito de' Medici, raising him to the inner circles of the papal court. Leo X's pontificate (1513–1521) was a time of great popularity and patronage for humanists. Valeriano, with his vast knowledge of hieroglyphics was very popular in scholarly circles, gaining many powerful positions through both his knowledge and connections. One such position that Valeriano held was secretary to the Cardinal Giulio de' Medici, the future Pope Clement VII. During Leo's pontificate, given his new status within the Papal Court, Valeriano was given almost unlimited access to hieroglyphics and antiquities in both public and private collections. This led to notable encounters with some of Italy's greatest painters of the time including Raphael, Michelangelo, and Titian.

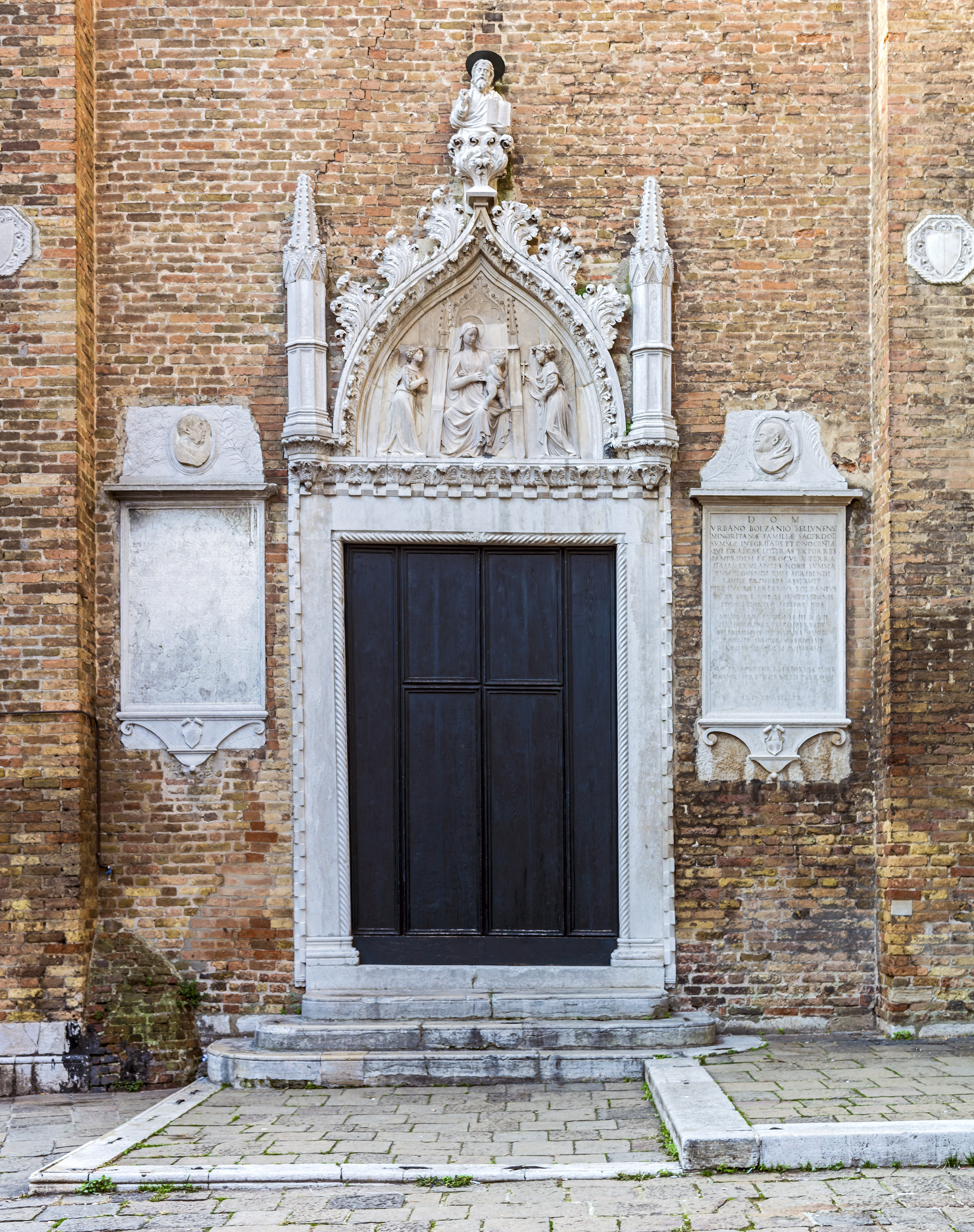
The tombs of Pierio Valeriano (right) and his uncle Fra Urban Bolzanio (left) at the Basilica di Santa Maria dei Frari in Venice

After Leo X's death in 1521, Valeriano lost his papal patronage with the accession of Pope Adrian VI. The papacy of Adrian VI brought far less patronage of humanists than under Leo X and Julius II before him, causing a mass exodus of humanists from Rome in the winter and spring of 1523 including Valeriano. This did not last, and Valeriano returned to Rome and prosperity upon the accession of his former employer Giulio de' Medici, who in 1523 became Pope Clement VII. Under the Medici popes Valeriano attained a number of positions and titles, including, protonotary apostolic, secret chamberlain, and given a canonry in his home of Belluno. Throughout this period from 1523 to 1527, Valeriano made the most of this relative prosperity and security of income to continue his research of hieroglyphics dividing his time between Florence and Rome. Despite these movements, he continued to teach, his students during this period including Giorgio Vasari, Alessandro Farnese, and Ippolito de' Medici.

The Sack of Rome in 1527 again forced him to move, travelling with a party including the Medici princes and others high in the papal court. Following news of the Sack, an uprising in Florence sought to overthrow the Medici rulers of that city, which caused a loss of almost all of Valeriano's possessions in both cities.

When Pope Clement VII fell ill and was expected to die in January 1529, he named his nephew (and Valeriano's pupil) Ippolito de' Medici as cardinal. Rewarded for his loyalty, Valeriano was named secretary to the cardinal, a position that offered him relative stability. His stay in Rome did not last, with records of him being based in Padua in 1531 and settling back to Belluno in 1532.

== Retirement and legacy ==
In 1538 Valeriano was ordained as a priest and moved back to Belluno where he spent the last twenty years of his life on his scholarly projects. These included editing Hieroglyphica, which despite being largely finished in the late 1520s, was only published in 1556, and several books on Greek grammar. Aside from a trip to Rome in 1536–1537, Valeriano would live out the rest of his days between Padua and Belluno, dying in the latter in 1558. Valeriano's work as a teacher inspired many, including the famous writer and painter Giorgio Vasari. His largely under-appreciated Hieroglyphica acts as a precursor to books such as Cesare Ripa's Iconologia, and is a guide to much Renaissance iconography.

== Notable works ==
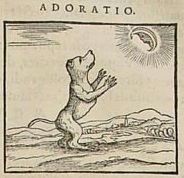
Image from Valeriano's Hieroglyphica of Adoratio

Among his books, De litteratorum infelicitate (or On the Ill Fortune of Learned Men) and Hieroglyphica sive de sacris Aegyptiorum litteris commentarii or Hieroglyphics, or Commentaries on the Sacred Letters of the Egyptians are those with the greatest legacy. De litteratorum infelicitate is a treatise on the misfortunes of learned men, containing anecdotes of their poverty, lives, and deaths. Though some of the stories are of dubious authenticity, the book provides an insight into the lives of Italian humanists in the first half of the sixteenth century.

Valeriano's Hieroglyphica was written following a frenzy of popularity surrounding the rediscovery of the Hieroglyphics of Horapollo, but was not published until after the initial excitement had subsided. For its day, the Hieroglyphica was the most concise Renaissance dictionary of symbols, an area of increasing interest at the time. The book was influenced largely by the Hieroglyphics of Horapollo, Valeriano's lifetime of studying Egyptian antiquities throughout Italy, and by first-hand knowledge passed down by his uncle Fra Urbano. Each entry contains a dedication to various people who supported, or influenced Valeriano in his epic compendium of imagery. The Hieroglyphica was published in Basel in 1556, reprinted seven times over the next 120 years in Latin, translated into French in 1576 and 1615, and Italian in 1602.

Valeriano was also a prolific writer of Latin poetry; in particular, a 1549 poem, "Pierus", written in the shape of a pear, is an early example of concrete poetry; it was famous enough to be known in England, where it was attacked by Gabriel Harvey. Little of this has survived and few copies remain outside of library and museum archives.
