= Bernardino Vitulini =

Italian painter

Bernardino Vitulini was an Italian painter. He was born in Serravalle, and lived at Belluno. He is known to have painted frescoes in the church of Ampezzo and Cadore, in 1350.
