= Urbano Bolzanio =

Italian humanist

Urbano Dalle Fosse, better known as Urbano Bolzanio (Belluno, 1442 – Venice, April 1524), was an Italian humanist and Hellenist.

== Life ==
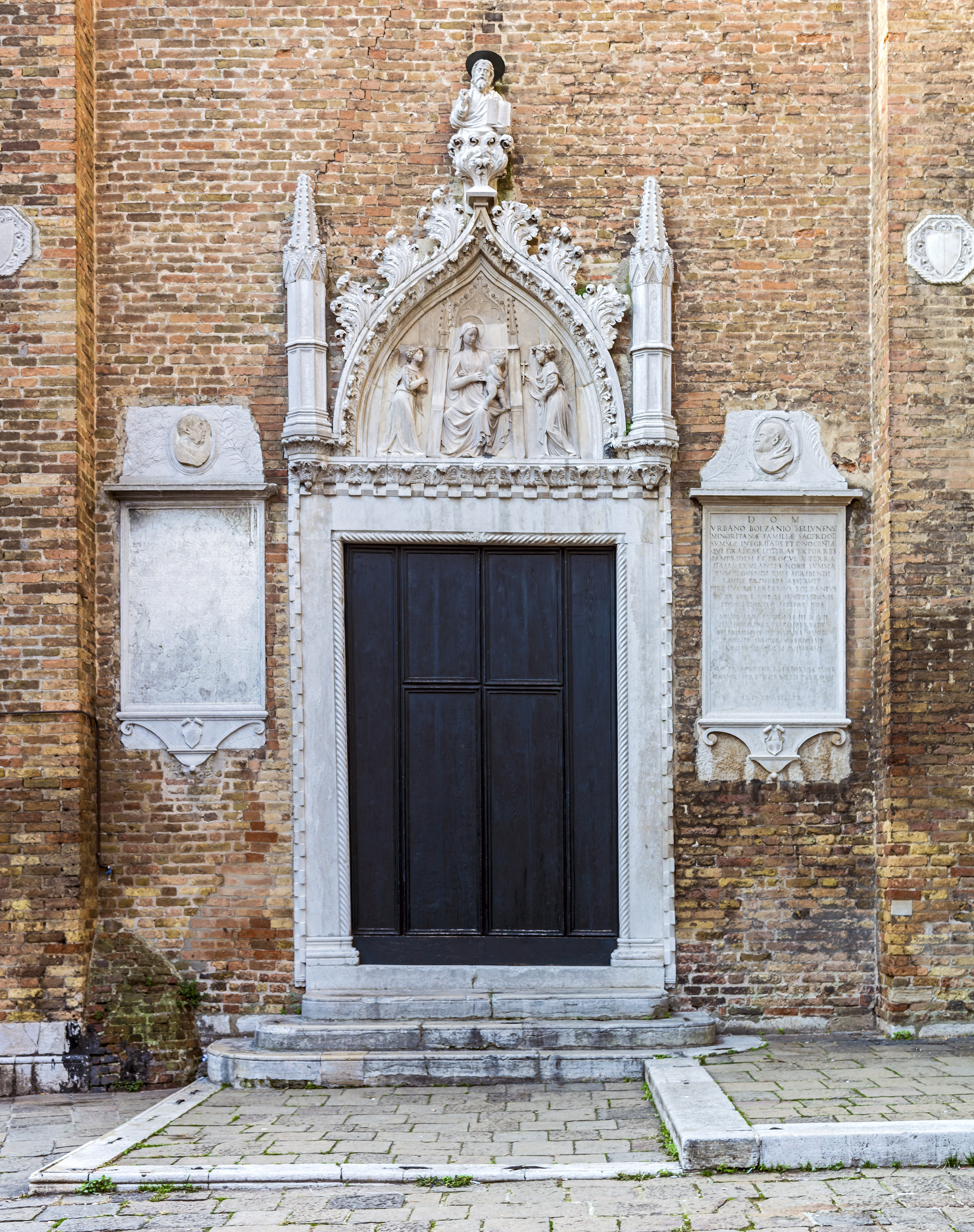
On the right side the tombstone of Pierio Valeriano and on the left that of his uncle Urban Bolzanio

The epithet "Bolzanio", by which he is universally known, was never used by Urbano, but was an invention of his nephew Pierio Valeriano which was subsequently extended to his whole family (Urbano is referred to by the sobriquet in his grammatical work's posthumous edition of 1545). It is not inappropriate, however, since the Delle Fosse family was originally from Bolzano, a village near Belluno.

Despite the claims of Pierio Valeriano, the Dalle Fosse family was not noble and Urbano himself was the son of a craftsman (a "mastro Pietro"). In 1450, when he was eight years old, Urbano appears as a novice at the Conventual Franciscan convent of San Pietro di Belluno. In 1465 he was still a student at the monastery, but in 1466 he was in Treviso, perhaps to study theology. In 1472 he spent time in the convent of San Nicolò della Lattuga in Venice, probably in order to further his studies in philosophy and dialectic.

Wishing to study eastern languages and learn about eastern civilizations, he travelled by foot to Thrace, Greece, Syria, Arabia, Palestine and Egypt between 1473 and 1489. His account of these travels is lost, but is referenced by many surviving works. Returning to Italy, he climbed Mount Etna twice to study the crater, which Pietro Bembo references in his dialogue De Aetna. He was follower of Constantine Lascaris at Messina, friend of Pietro Bembo, and collaborator of Aldo Manuzio, for whose circle he published a grammar of Ancient Greek in 1498. Urbano was well integrated into the cultural life of Venice, where he was soon joined by his nephew Pietro Valeriano. In 1484 Urbano moved to Florence at the invitation of Lorenzo de' Medici who appointed him tutor of his son Giovanni, the future Pope Leo X. When Giovanni became a cardinal and was transferred to Pisa, Urbano returned to Venice, where he taught Greek from 1489 to 1497. In 1502, in the company of Andrea Gritti, Urbano travelled to Constantinople. The last journey of which we have record is a trip to Rome in 1515 to visit his former pupil, Pope Leo X. He died in 1525 aged 81 years, as recorded by Pierio Valeriano on his tombstone in the wall of the Basilica Santa Maria Gloriosa dei Frari in Venice.

== Works ==
Bolzanio's most important work is Institutiones Graecae Grammatices, a grammar of Ancient Greek published for the ciricle of Aldo Manuzio and dedicated to Giovanni Francesco Pico della Mirandola. In this work, originally written entirely in Latin, he describes the nouns, verbs, and other parts of speech. It was extraordinarily successful, enjoying 23 editions in only a few years.

== Bibliography ==
- Lucia Gualdo Rosa, «DALLE FOSSE (Bolzanio), Urbano», in Dizionario Biografico degli Italiani, Volume 32, Roma, Istituto dell'Enciclopedia Italiana, 1986.
- Ticozzi Stefano, Storia dei letterati ed artisti del dipartimento della Piave, Belluno, presso Francesc'Antonio Tissi, 1813, Lib. II, cap. I.
- Schiavi Alessandro, Urbano Valeriano nei suoi viaggi in Grecia, Egitto, Turchia, Belluno, Delibarali, 1842.
- Doglioni Lucio,Vita di Urbano Valeriano, Belluno, Tipografia Tissi, 1874.
- Bustico Giovanni, Due umanisti veneti, Urbano Bolzanio e Pierio Valeriano in Civiltà moderna, IV, 1-2, 1932.
- Rollo Antonio, La grammatica greca di Urbano Bolzanio in Umanisti bellunesi fra Quattro e Cinquecento Atti del convegno (Belluno, 5 novembre 1999), a cura di Paolo Pellegrini, Firenze, Leo S. Olschki Editore, 2001.
