= Cesa (disambiguation) =

Cesa is a town in Italy.

Cesa or CESA may also refer to:

- Cesa (butterfly), a butterfly genus of the family Lycaenidae
- Cesa (surname), an Italian surname

== CESA ==
- California Endangered Species Act
- Coverdell Education Savings Account
- Church of England in South Africa
- Computer Entertainment Supplier's Association
- Continental Europe Synchronous Area
- Cryptographic Engine and Security Accelerator like for example TrustZone (Security Extensions) as part of the ARM architecture
- Controlled emergency swimming ascent, an emergency ascent technique for scuba divers
- Cyberspace Electronic Security Act
- CESA Awards
- CesA, cellulose synthase
