= Dolomitibus =

Italian short-distance regional coach company

Dolomiti Bus
- Logo DolomitiBus
- Founded: 1914 (112 years ago)
- Headquarters: Belluno, Veneto Italy
- Service area: Italy; Veneto
- Service type: regional coach service
- Website: dolomitibus.it

Dolomiti Bus S.p.A., sometimes also referred to as Dolomitibus, is an Italian company, controlled by Autoguidovie, which operates local public transport services in the province of Belluno.

== History ==
The company was founded around 1914 with the founding of the Buzzatti company, renamed Buzzatti Giovanni e F.lli S.p.A. in 1956, to manage bus services in the province of Belluno. In 1982, it changed its name to Dolomiti Bus, and in the following years it began to incorporate numerous public transport companies, including: Zasio S.r.l. (municipalities on the left bank of the Piave River), SAAB F.lli Da Rolt S.r.l. (Alpago), and Automobilistica Cadore S.r.l. (Cadore, Comelico, Valle d'Ampezzo, and Longaronese) in 1984, Belluno Bus S.p.A. (manager of urban transport in Belluno) in 1987, Conz S.r.l. (Seren del Grappa) in 1989, and a branch of Andreella S.n.c. (Ponte nelle Alpi) in 1995.

On 15 April 1999, the company increased its share capital to 7,568,760,000 lire, consisting of the province (83.47%) and the municipality (16.53%) of Belluno. At the same time, the company held a 49% stake in Mobel S.r.l. (operator of the paid parking lots in Belluno and of the escalator between the Lambioi parking lot and the historic centre) as well as smaller stakes in Società Turismo Belluno and Nuovi Impianti Sportivi (NIS).

In 2000, the share capital was increased again, to 6,266,173.50 euros, and a partial privatization of the company began with a public tender which rewarded the operators Autoguidovie (26.07%) and Autolinee dell'Emilia (13.43%). Subsequently, in 2005, Autoguidovie purchased the share of Autolinee dell'Emilia, reaching 39.5%, and in 2008, Transdev Italia (a company of the French group Transdev) purchased the share of Autoguidovie; in 2011, Transdev Italia was transferred entirely to RATP Dev (of the French group RATP) while in 2013 the province of Belluno acquired the share held by the municipality.

Between 2013 and 2014 RATP Dev sold its shares in Dolomiti Bus to the entrepreneur Federico Mattioli for 6.2 million euros, who also distributed them through two of his companies (Veneta Bus and La Linea, both with a 5% share each). Subsequently, Mattioli put 24.5% of the company's shares up for sale, which, after an initial interest from ATV, were purchased again by Autoguidovie. In 2021, a further increase in share capital to 8,935,962.50 euros was approved, which brought Autoguidovie to the majority (50.65%).

== Company data ==
The company is controlled by Autoguidovie (50.65%), a private local public transport company of the Ranza group, and also includes the province of Belluno (42.35%) and Federico Mattioli (7%) as shareholders.

The headquarters are in Belluno, at Via Col da Ren, 18, where the main workshop and depot are also located. There are also four agencies in Belluno, Feltre, Agordo, and Calalzo di Cadore. Historically, the company also owned a depot in Pedavena, which has now been sold to private individuals.

The fleet consists of approximately 204 buses and is among the most modern and environmentally friendly in the country, with an average age of 10 years. The company is investing in the future of public transport with the arrival of 23 new buses, entering service in September 2025. This strategic operation, worth nearly €7 million, is co-financed with public funds as part of the National Strategic Plan for Sustainable Mobility.

On the occasion of the Milan Cortina 2026 Olympic and Paralympic Winter Games, Dolomiti Bus is introducing a special fare for the Calalzo – Cortina line 30, following the expansion of the service, which will be organized in two phases, with different timetables and frequencies based on the season.

== See also ==
- Transport in Italy
- Intercity bus service
