= Antonio Ermolao Paoletti =

Italian painter (1834–1912)

Antonio Ermolao Paoletti (May 8, 1834, in Venice – December 13, 1912, in Venice) was an Italian painter, mainly of Venetian genre scenes, recalling Bamboccianti life of children and women, as well as sacred fresco work for churches in the Veneto.

Antonio's father, Ermolao Paoletti, was a well known scholar and writer of Venice. He wrote a much cited expansive guide to its architecture, monuments, artistic works, and customs. He also wrote a dictionary of Venetian dialect. He was an engraver and painter, and was a professor at the Accademia di Belle Arti in Venice.

Antonio attended course in the Accademia as a pupil of Pompeo Marino Molmenti, and as a colleague of the sculptor Antonio Dal Zotto and the Armenian painter and engraver Edgar Chahine.

He displayed in various exhibitions, including Milan in 1872, where he displayed Ecco come va il vino nelle messe; at the 1884 Exhibition of Turin: Flowers for the Holy Virgin and Fa' caro al nonno!; at the 1884 Promotrice Popolana Venicena; il pesce addenti; and in 1885, Il venditore di pesce.

Among his many frescoes is the main altarpiece depicting the Madonna of the Rosary with St Anthony and St Materno (1863) for the parish church of Melara. Like his father, Antonio also became a professor at the Accademia.

== Gallery ==
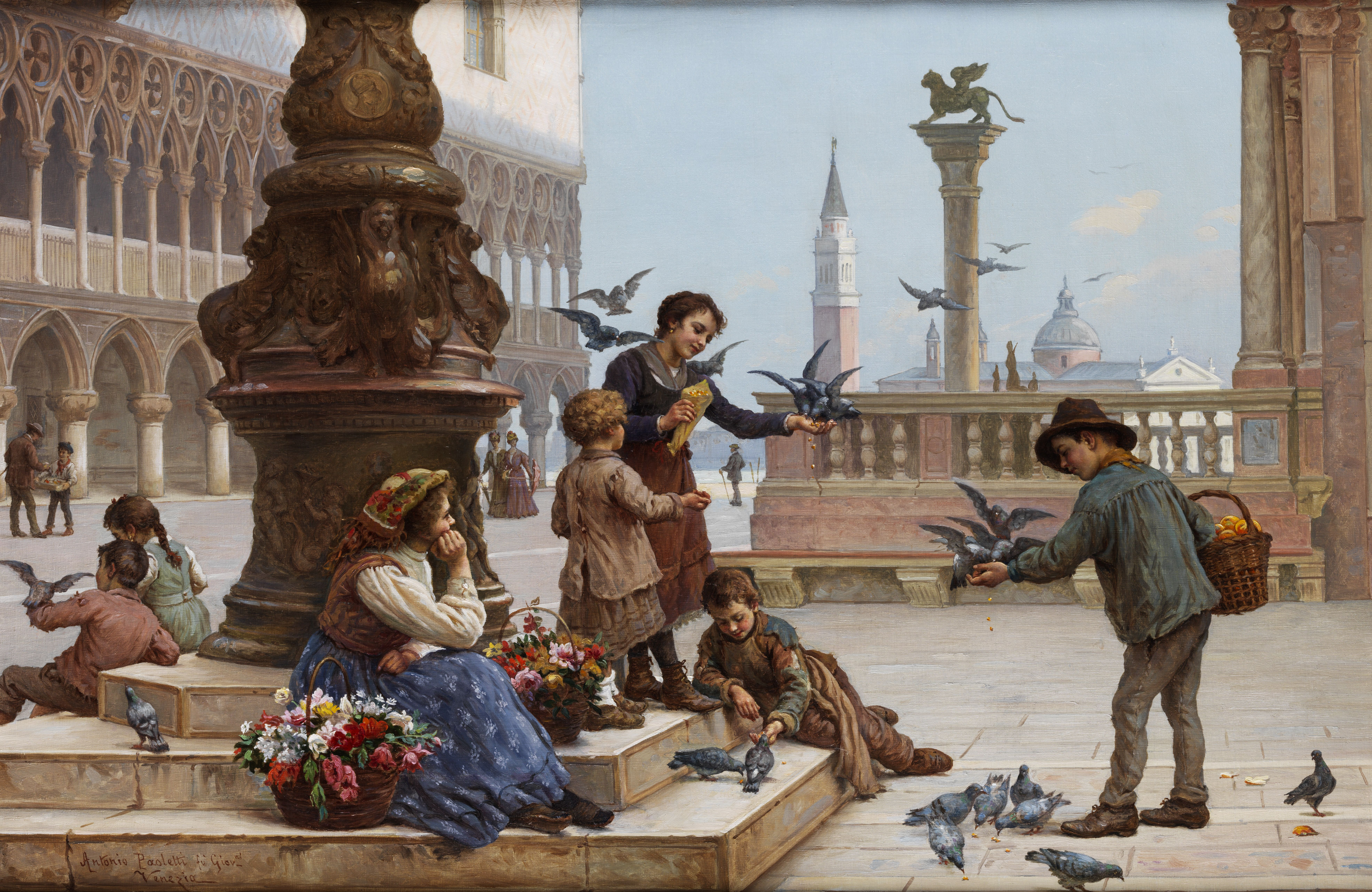
Children Feeding Pigeons

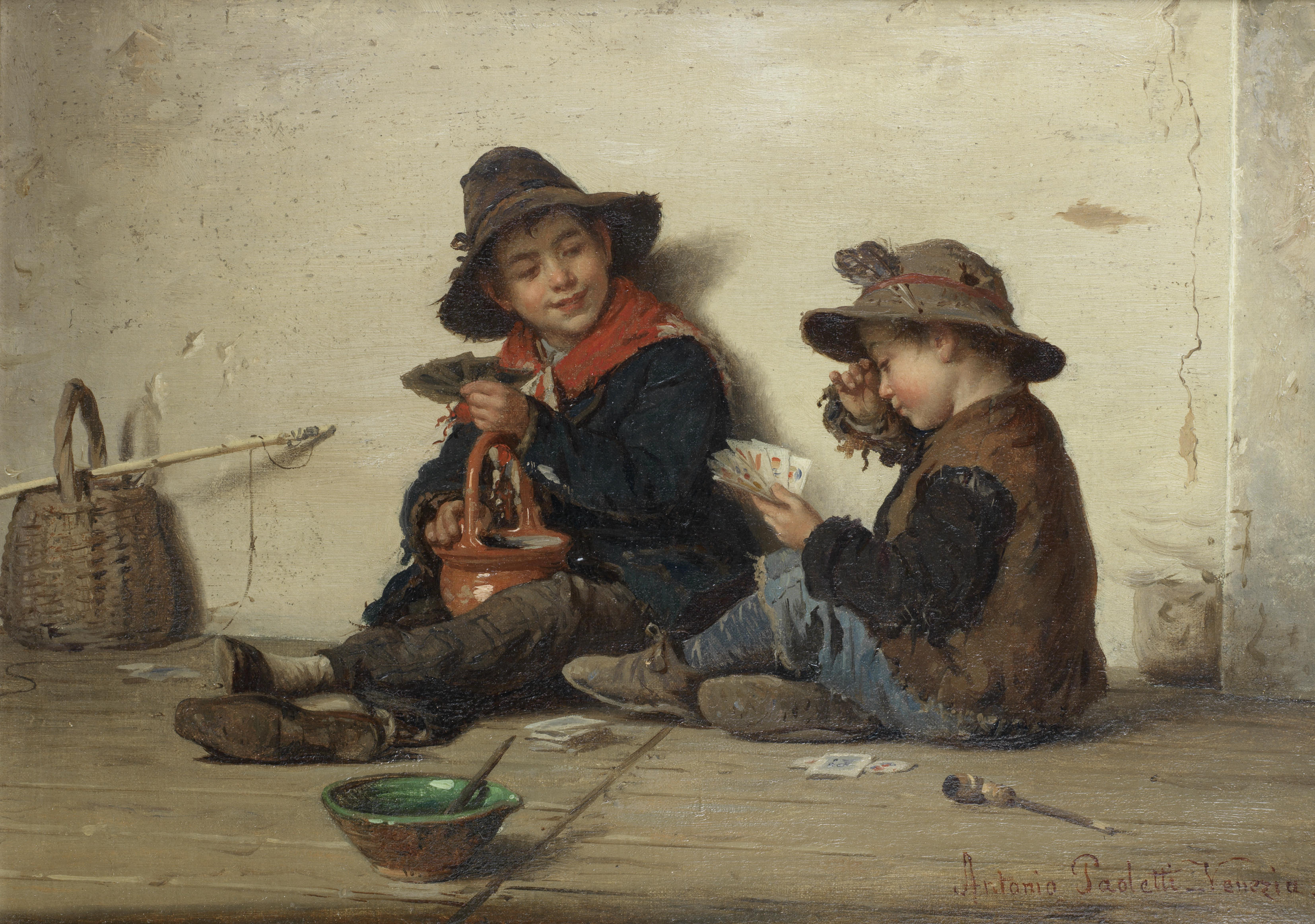
The Bluff

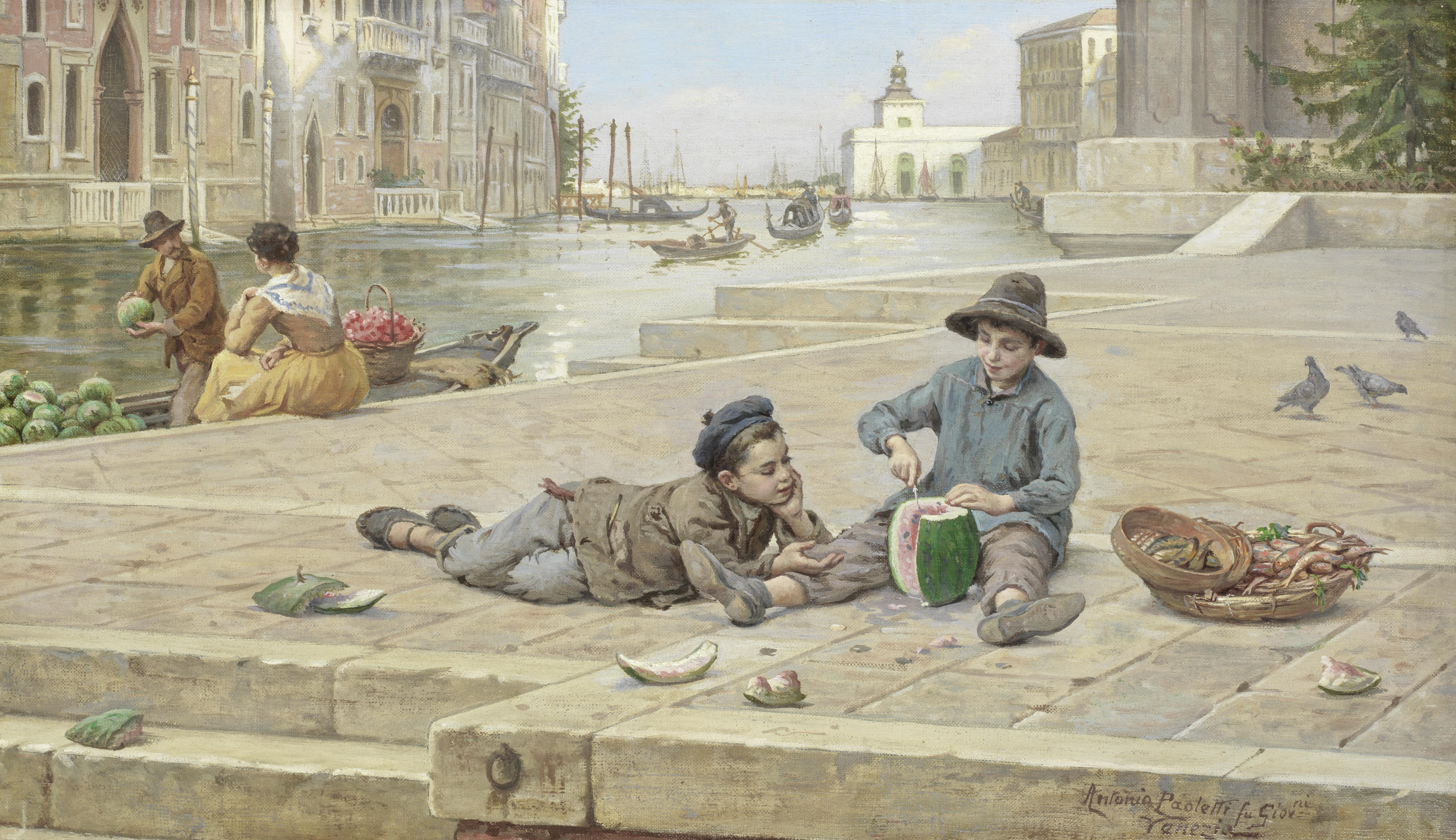
The Melon Sellers

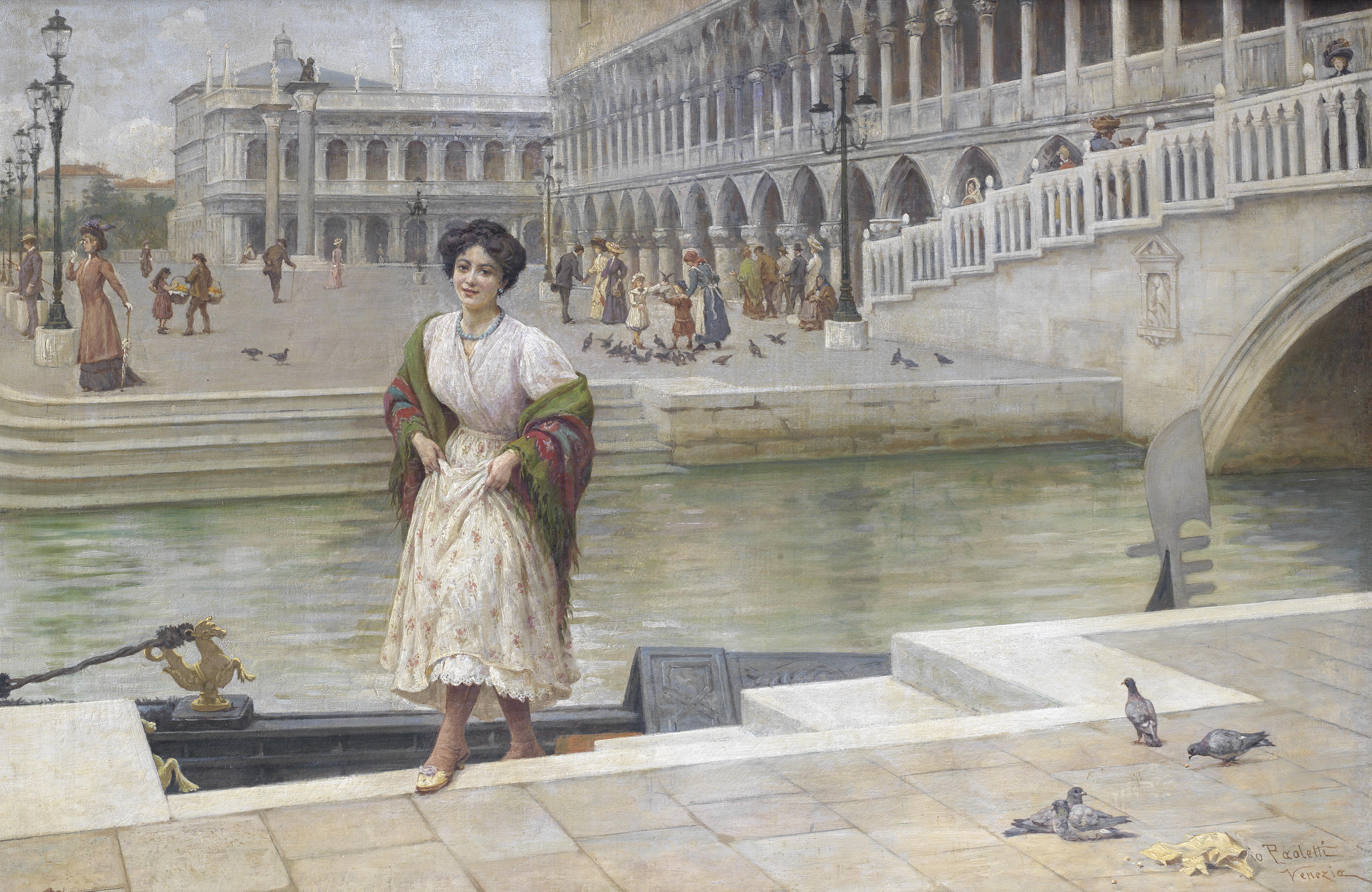
A Venetian Beauty

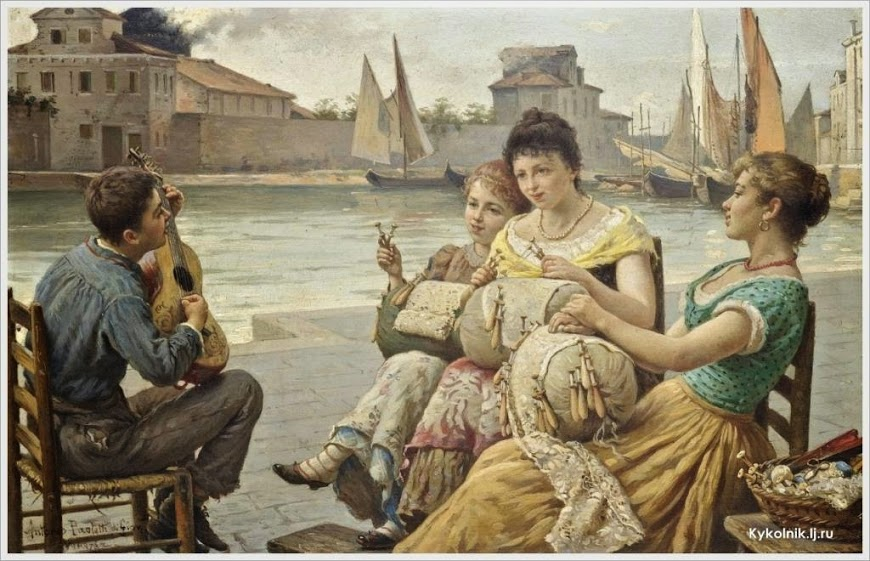
A serenade for the lacemakers
