= Maurizio Vitale Cesa =

Italian sportswear entrepreneur (1945–1987)

Maurizio Vitale Cesa (1945–1987) was an Italian entrepreneur and sportswear inventor of brands Robe di Kappa and Jesus Jeans.

== Early life and career ==
Maurizio was born in 1945, to David Vitale and Paola Cesa. In 1968, at 23 years of age, he became CEO of the family business, the Maglificio Calzificio Torinese. He turned the Robe di Kappa after seeing a John Lennon interview on US television wearing the military-green shirt of a fallen US soldier in Vietnam. As thousands of T-shirts left unsold in its company's warehouses, he got the products dyed in military green and had them decorated with army patches and put them on the market. It was a resounding success.

=== Blue Jesus ===
In 1971, sensing the company's prospective future in youth casual fashion, he introduced a new jeans brand, Blue Jesus. Launched with the advertising campaign 'He who loves me follows me', it stirred controversy with the Roman Catholic Church, which was resisting social change spurred by Western youth. It hit record retail sales for an Italian jeans brand. In 1979, Jesus was the first jeans brand to be made available in the Soviet Union, through a joint venture Maurizio signed, licensing the brand and production techniques to a state-owned garment producer.

=== Sportswear ===
In the early '80s, Maurizio once more showed his nature of setter of fashion and garments trends when he re-positioned Robe di Kappa as an active sportswear brand and, in the process, created a new sector in the Italian market. The brand was launched with professional football player and teenage girls icon Marco Tardelli, pre-empting the trend of using professional athletes as brand testimonials, which later has become the pillar of global growth of sportswear brands such as Nike and Adidas. In 1981, he signed what it turned out to be the 1st technical sponsorship deal with a Football Club, which granted Robe di Kappa the right to brand playing kits of professional club FC Juventus, an agreement which lasted a record 23 years. In 1984 the brand Kappa sponsored the US Track & Field Olympic team at the Los Angeles 1984 Games.

== Personal life ==
Maurizio Vitale was married twice and had four offspring: Maurizio Junior and Tancredi with Maddalena Marrone; Maria (who didn't survive birth) and Oliviero with Carolina Blaaw. Maurizio Vitale died of AIDS in Turin, on June 4, 1987, at 42 years of age.
