= Bolzano Bellunese =

- Frazione
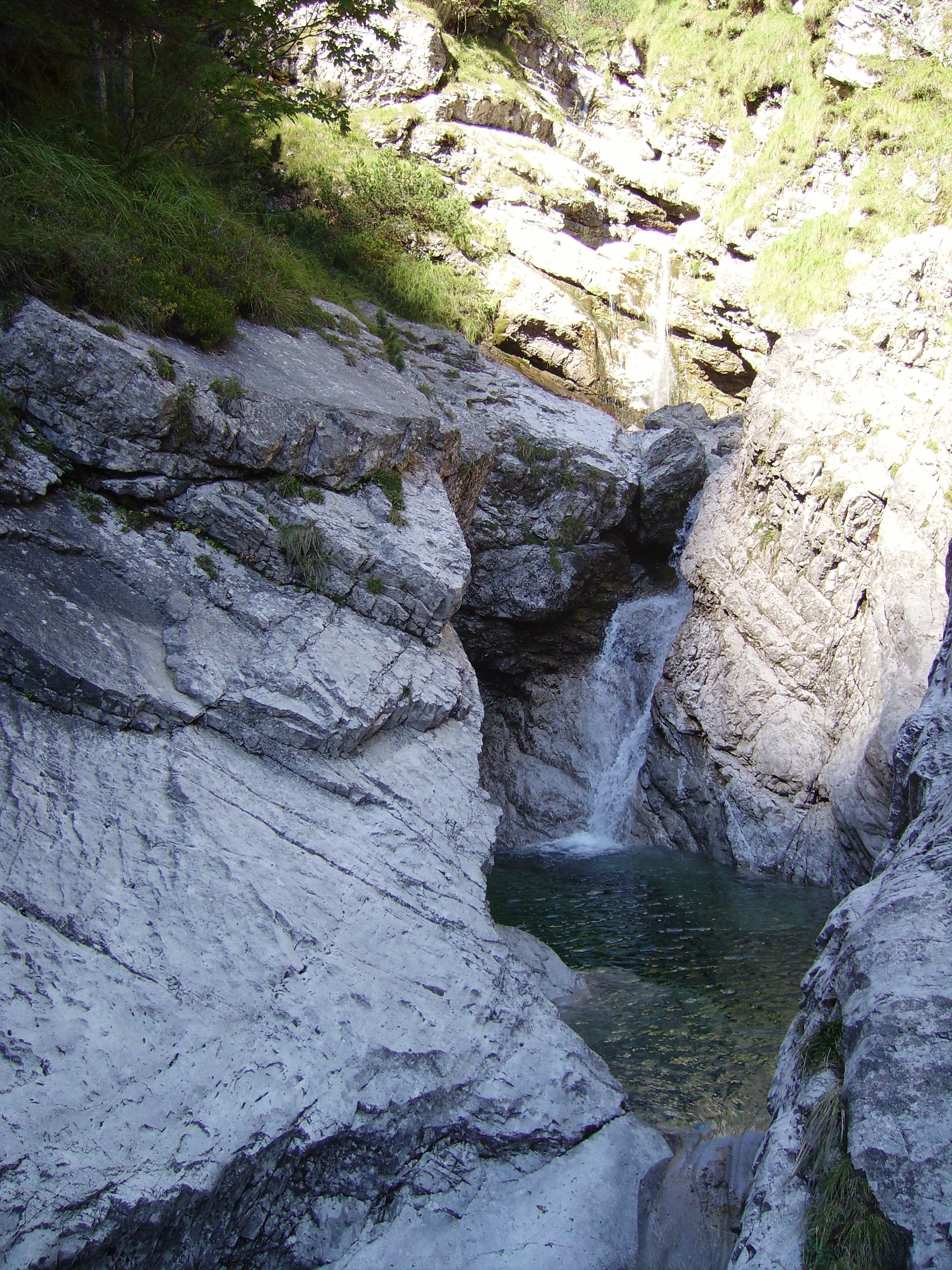
- The gorges of the Ardo between the Rifugio 7º Alpini and Bolzano Bellunese

- Location of Bolzano Bellunese in Italy
- Coordinates: 46°09′43″N 12°11′16″E
- Country: Italy
- Region: Veneto
- Province: Belluno (BL)
- Comune: Belluno
- Elevation: 532 m (1,745 ft)

Population
  - Total: 700
- Demonym: Bolzanini
- Time zone: UTC+1 (CET)
  - Summer (DST): UTC+2 (CEST)
- Postal code: 32020
- Dialing code: (+39) 0437
- Website: Official website

Bolzano Bellunese is an Italian village, hamlet (frazione) of Belluno, in the Veneto.

== Geography ==
The village is located in north of Belluno, about 5 km from the centre, to the right of the Piave. It is a small town in the midst of the forest, of around 700 inhabitants. There is a sub-frazione, called Gioz. Both villages are found high on the right bank of the river Ardo, where the river passes through a deep valley.

== History ==
Bolzano Bellunese is ancient in origin. The parish church dates back to the fourteenth century and is named for the apostles Saint Peter and Saint Paul. It retains an important cycle of frescoes dedicated to Saint Peter, of uncertain origin. The road below the church leads to Rifugio 7º Alpini, on the slopes of Mount Schiara, considered a World Heritage Site by UNESCO.

== Bibliography ==
- Touring club italiano, Belluno e provincia: Feltre, Cortina d'Ampezzo e le Dolomiti bellunesi, Guide verdi d'Italia, Milano: Touring Editore, 2004, p. 45, ISBN 88-365-3135-0, ISBN 9788836531356 (Google Books)
