= Schiara =

Mountain in Italy

Coordinates: 46°13′56″N 12°11′1″E

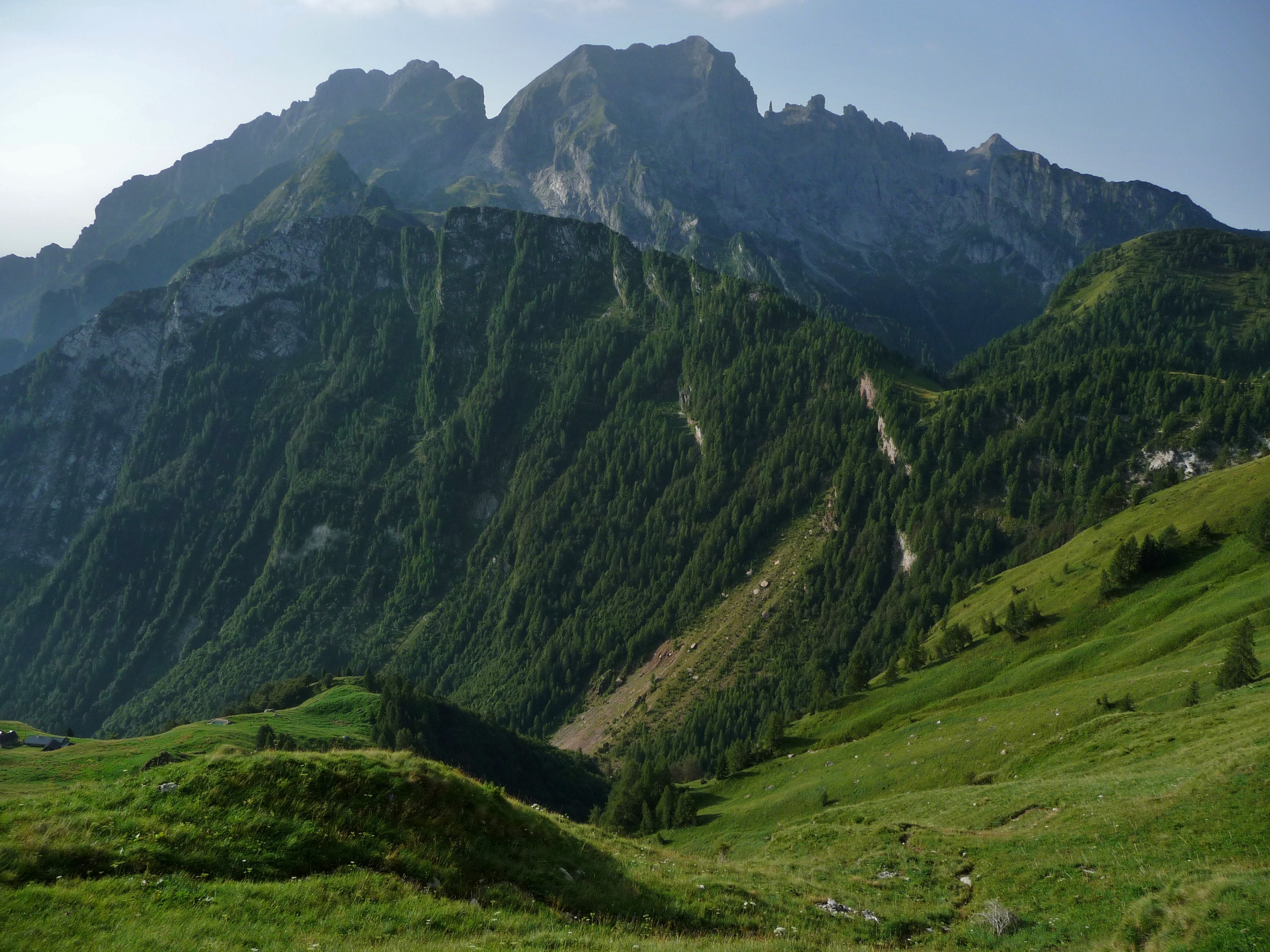
- Monte Schiara

Highest point
- Elevation: 2,565 m (8,415 ft)
- Prominence: 964 m (3,163 ft)
- Listing: Alpine mountains 2500-2999 m

Geography
- Location: Veneto Italy
- Parent range: Dolomites

Climbing
- First ascent: Gottfried Merzbacher in 1878
- Easiest route: via ferrata

The Schiara (Italian: Monte Schiara) is a mountain in the southern Dolomites of Veneto in northern Italy. It is located just north of the town of Belluno, approximately 50 miles north of Venice. Monte Schiara has an elevation of 2,565 metres.

== The best trails ==
- Ferrata Luigi Zacchi (difficulty D)
- Ferrata Berti (difficulty C)
- Ferrata Marmol (difficulty C)
- Ferrata Sperti (difficulty C)

== Huts and bivouacs ==
- Rifugio 7° Alpini (1491 m)
  Mountain hut located below the southern face (900 metres) of Monte Schiara, in the valley of Val d'Ardo. Its capacity is 50 beds and it is open from mid-June to the end of September. It is owned by the Italian Alpine Club. The hut was built by the 7th (Alpini) Mountain Infantry Regiment, hence the name of the hut.

Bivouacs:

- Bivacco I. e G. Sperti (2,000 m) (Sperti trail)
- Bivacco U della Bernardina (2,320 m) (Zacchi trail)
- Bivacco del Marmol (2,266 m) (Marmol trail)
