= Cesare Vecellio =

Italian engraver and painter

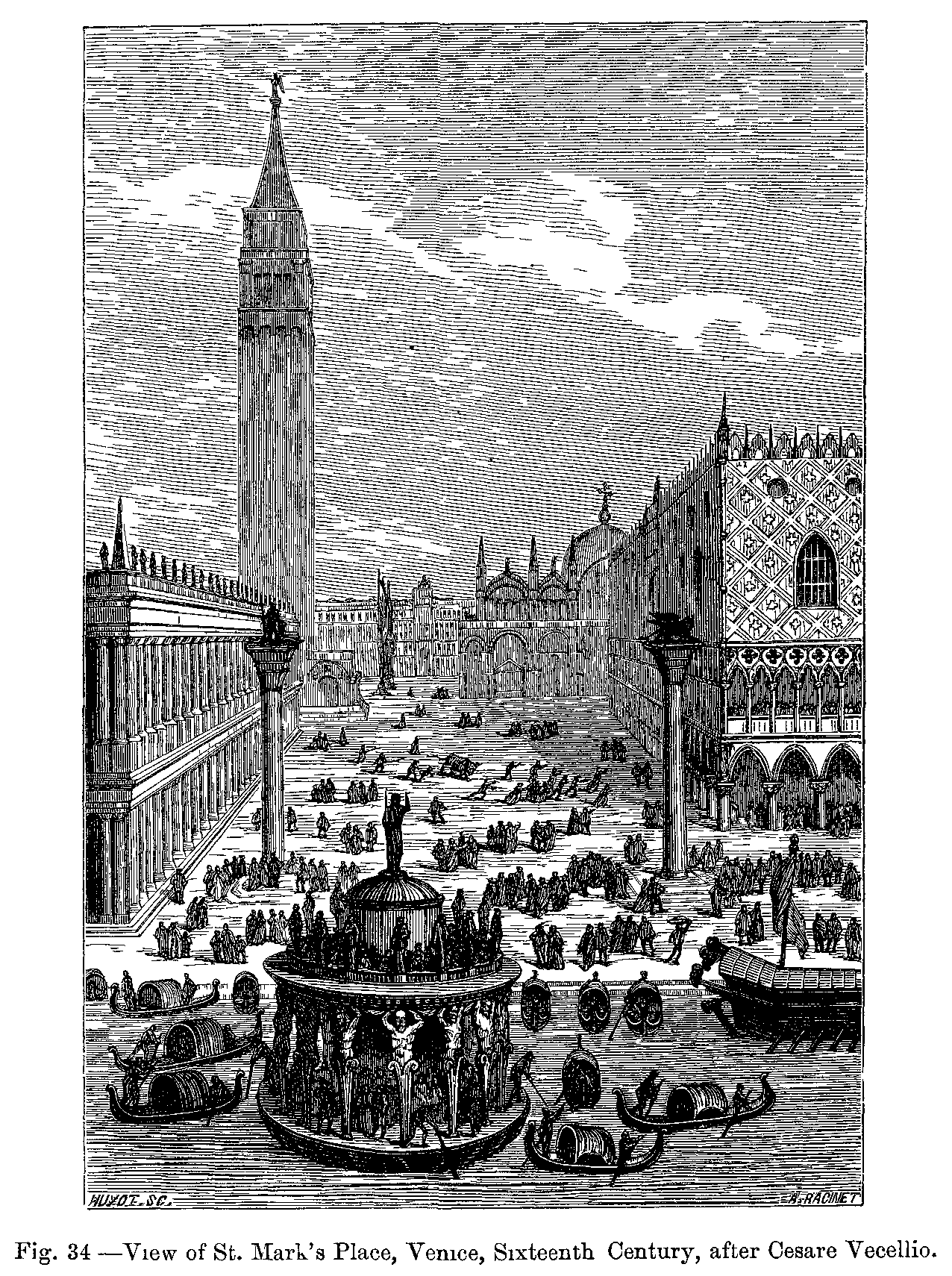
View of the Piazzetta in the 16th century, after Cesare Vecellio

Cesare Vecellio (c. 1521 – c. 1601) was an Italian draftsman and painter of the Renaissance, active in Venice.

He was the cousin of the painter Titian. Like Titian, he was born in Cadore in the Veneto. He accompanied Titian to Augsburg in 1548, and seems to have worked as his assistant. Many of Cesare's pictures were ascribed, perhaps knowingly, to Titian. In the Milan Pinacoteca there is a small Trinity by Cesare. In addition to his work as a painter, he published several books during his lifetime, including Habiti Antichi, et Moderni di Diverse Parti del Mondo. First published in Venice in 1590, it contains nearly 600 images depicting the garb of men and women of varied status from many parts of the then-known world.

Cesare's brother, Fabrizio di Cadore was little known beyond his native place, for the Council-hall of which he is said to have painted a fine picture. He died in 1580.

== See also ==
For more details of on contemporary fashion see 1550-1600 in Western European fashion.
