= Andrea Brustolon =

Italian sculptor

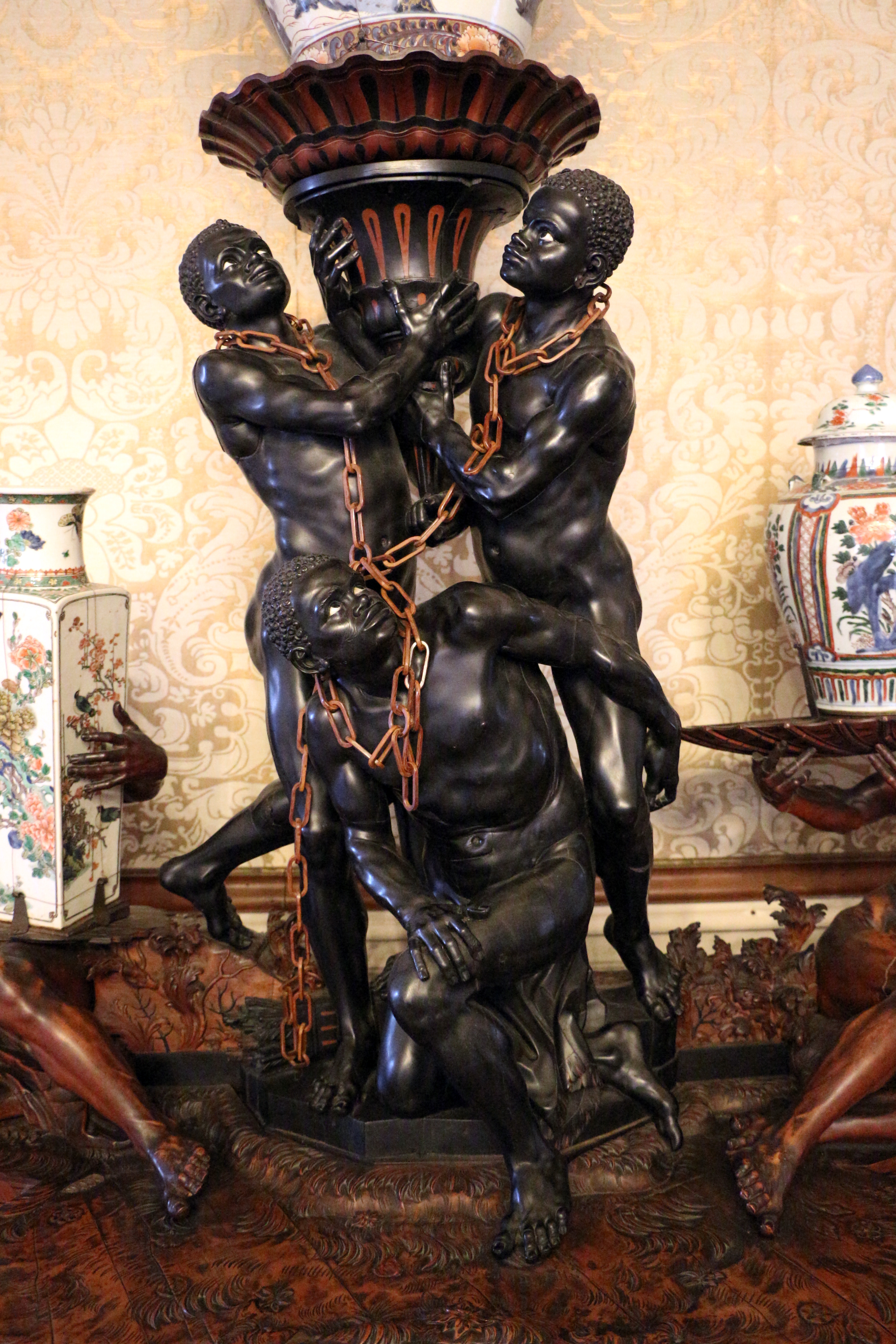
Brustolon's carved concolle for vases (Ca' Rezzonico, Venice)

Andrea Brustolon (20 July 1662 – 25 October 1732) was an Italian sculptor in wood. He is known for his furnishings in the Baroque style and devotional sculptures.

== Biography ==
He was trained in a vigorous local tradition of sculpture in his native Belluno, in the Venetian terraferma, and in the studio of the Genoese sculptor Filippo Parodi, who was carrying out commissions in Padua and in Venice (1677). He spent the years 1678–80 in Rome, where the High Baroque sculpture of Bernini and his contemporaries polished his style. Apart from that, the first phase of Brustolon's working career was spent in Venice, 1680–1685. Brustolon is documented at several Venetian churches where he executed decorative carving in such profusion that he must have quickly assembled a large studio of assistants. Similar to his contemporary in London, Grinling Gibbons, almost all the high-quality robust Baroque carving in Venice has been attributed to Brustolon at one time or another. In the Venetian Ghetto, at the Scola Levantina, Brustolon provided the woodwork for the synagogue on the piano nobile, where the carved, canopied bimah is supported on Solomonic columns, which Brustolon had seen in Bernini's baldacchino in the Basilica of St Peter's.

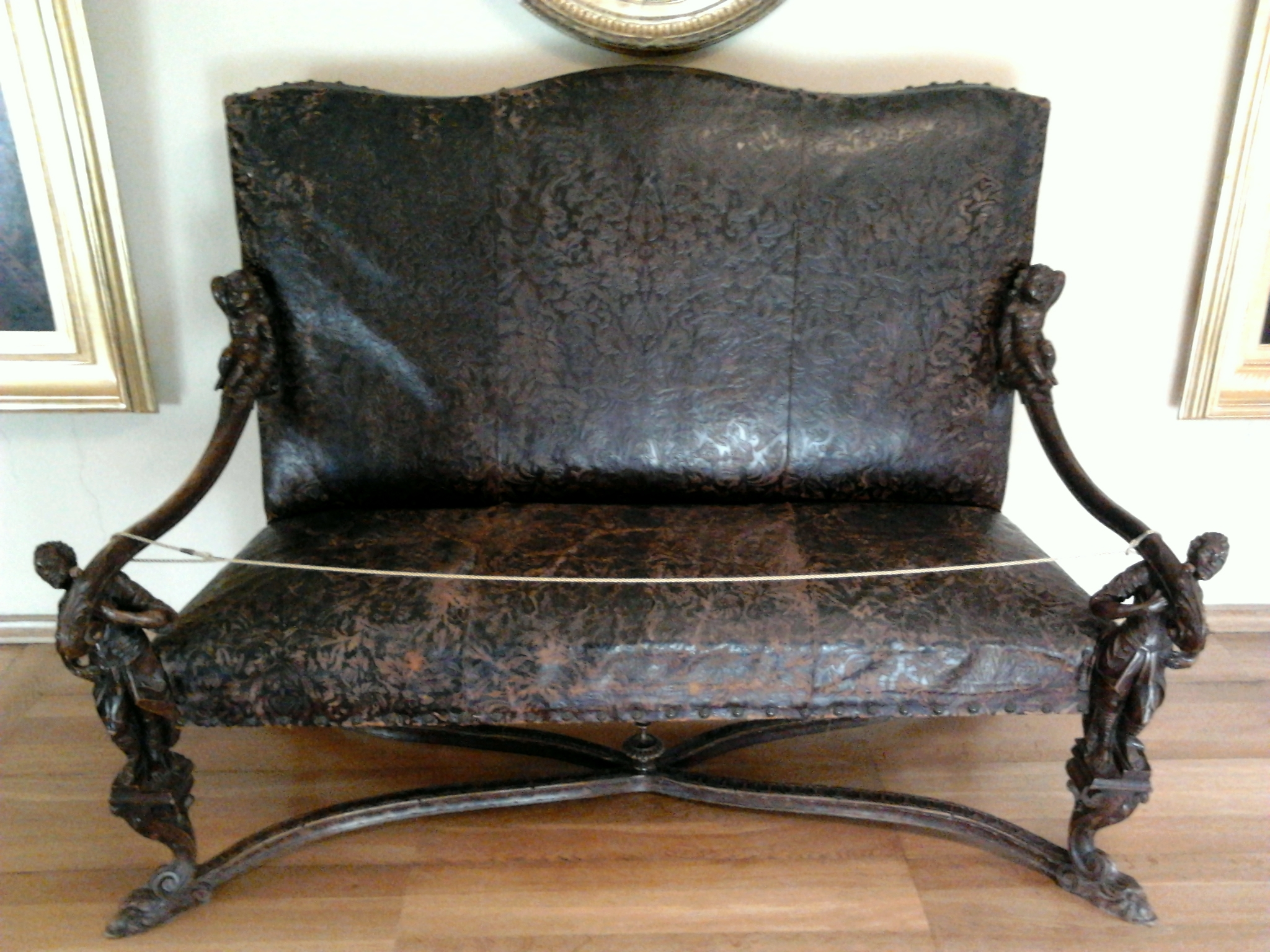
Brustolon's sofa with black slaves covered with embossed leather (cordovan), National Museum in Warsaw.

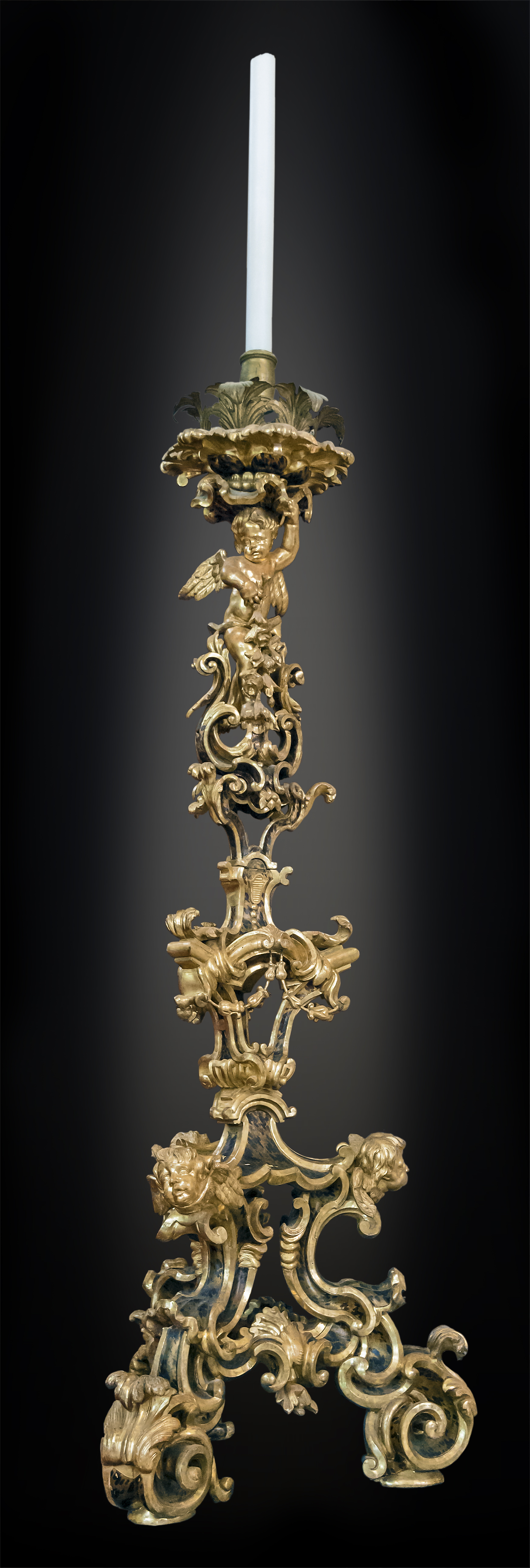
Candelabra in San Trovaso Venice

His furniture included armchairs with figural sculptures that take the place of front legs and armrest supports, inspired by his experience of Bernini's Cathedra Petri. The gueridon, a tall stand for a candelabrum, offered Brustolon unhampered possibilities for variations of the idea of a caryatid or atlas: the familiar Baroque painted and ebonized blackamoor gueridons, endlessly reproduced since the eighteenth century, found their models in Brustolon's work.

His secular commissions from Pietro Venier, of the Venier di San Vio family (a suite of forty sculptural pieces that can be seen in the Sala di Brustolon of the Ca' Rezzonico, Venice), from the Pisani of Strà, and from the Correr di San Simeone families encourage the attribution to him of some extravagantly rich undocumented moveable furniture. Andrea Brustolon's elaborate carved furniture aspired towards the condition of sculpture, such as the Dutch bases for console tables which look like enlargements of the work of the two Van Vianens, Paulus and Adam, perhaps the greatest Dutch silversmiths of the period. These carved pieces display the baroque tendency to develop a form three-dimensionally in space.

Brustolon's walnut, boxwood and ebony pieces transcend ordinary functional limitations of furniture; they are constructed of elaborately carved figures. The framework of Brustolon's chairs, side tables and gueridons were carved as gnarled tree branches, with further supports of putti and moors carved in ebony. Backrests of the chairs, which were never touched in the rigidly upright posture that contemporary etiquette demanded, were carved with allegories of vanity, fire and music, etc.

The most extravagant piece delivered for Pietro Venier was a large side table and vase-stand of box and ebony, designed as a single ensemble to display rare imported Japanese porcelain vases. The eclectic allegories include Hercules with the Hydra and Cerberus, moors and reclining river-gods (see ref.).

For the Correr, less extrovert chairs bear female nudes extended along the armrests. For the Pisani, he carved a suite of twelve chairs (now at the Palazzo Quirinale) with flowers, fruit, leaves and branches to symbolize the twelve months of the year. Work by Brustolon is at the Villa Pisani at Stra.

In 1685 Brustolon returned to the house where he was born in Belluno, and from that time devoted himself mainly to tabernacles and devotional sculptures in walnut, boxwood or ivory. His polychromed ivory Corpus from a crucifix is in the Museo Civico di Belluno, which preserves some of Brustolon's preparatory drawings for frames to be carved with putti displaying emblems. A pair of boxwood sculptures, The Sacrifice of Abraham and Jacob Wrestling with the Angel, integral with scrolling barocchetto stands, were in the collection of Justus Liebig (Liebigshaus, Frankfort). An altarpiece, c. 1720, is at the Victoria and Albert Museum, London.

He died in Belluno in 1732.

Brustolon had many imitators working in his style, both contemporary, and later. The Venetian sculptor Valentino Panciera Besarel (1829–1902) made upholstered armchairs in the Brustolon manner from the 1860s.
