= Belluno =

Belluno Belum (Ladin) Belùn (Venetian)
- Comune
- Città di Belluno
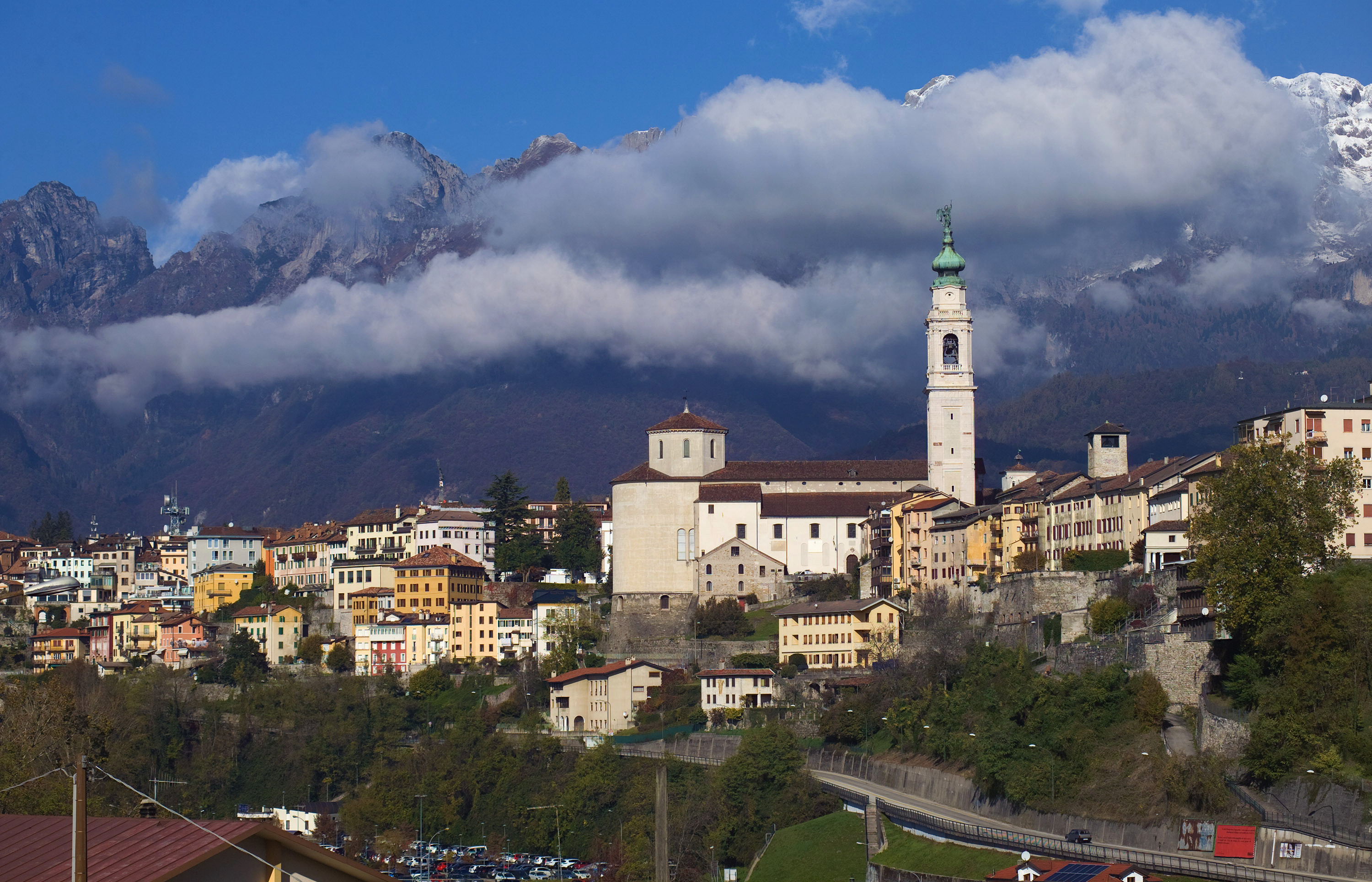
- View of Belluno with the cathedral in the centre

- Flag Coat of arms

- Location within Italy Location within Veneto
- Coordinates: 46°08′25″N 12°13′00″E
- Country: Italy
- Region: Veneto
- Province: Belluno (BL)
- Frazioni: see list

Government
  - Mayor: Oscar de Pellegrin

Area
  - Total: 147.22 km^{2} (56.84 sq mi)
- Elevation: 390 m (1,280 ft)

Population (2025)
  - Total: 35,543
  - Density: 241.43/km^{2} (625.30/sq mi)
- Demonym: Bellunesi
- Time zone: UTC+1 (CET)
  - Summer (DST): UTC+2 (CEST)
- Postal code: 32100
- Dialing code: 0437
- Patron saint: Saint Martin
- Saint day: 11 November
- Website: Official website

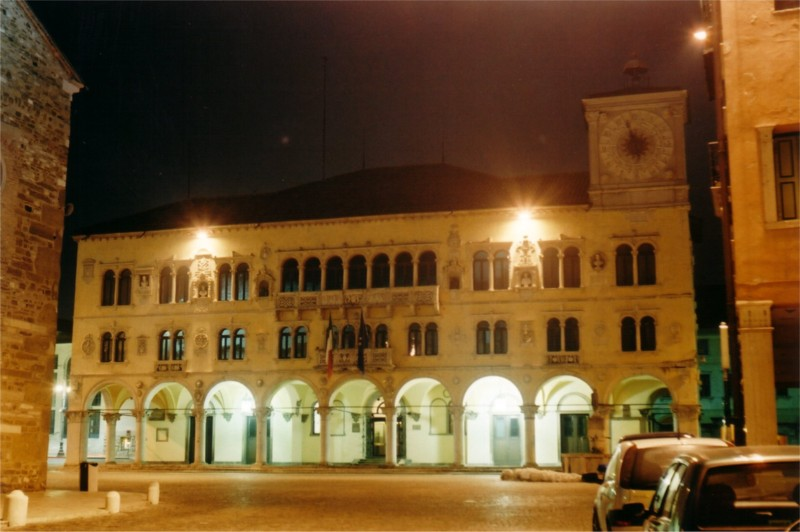
Palazzo dei Rettori by night

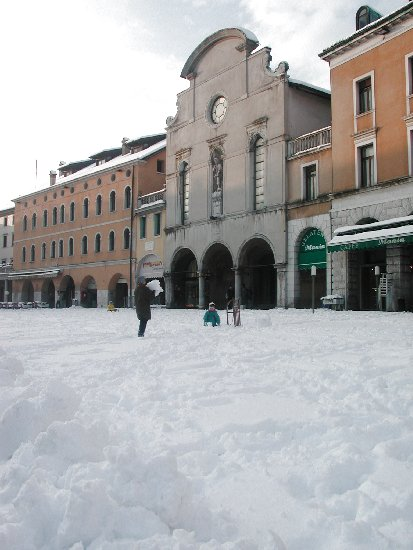
Façade of the church of San Rocco

Belluno (Italian pronunciation: [belˈluːno]; Ladin: Belum; Venetian: Belùn) is a town and province in the Veneto region of northern Italy. Located about 100 kilometres (62 miles) north of Venice, Belluno is the capital of the province of Belluno and the most important city in the Eastern Dolomites region. With a population of 35,543, it is the largest populated area of Valbelluna, and the 12th-largest municipality of Veneto.

It is one of the 15 municipalities of the Dolomiti Bellunesi National Park.

== History ==
The name of the city is derived from Celtic belo-dunum which means "shining hill."

It is conjectured that the population of the area that became Belluno was largely Venetic with a strong Celtic minority. However, as the Romans expanded northward into the Alps, the Celtic either emigrated or were absorbed. The people of the area swore friendship to Rome in the 225 BC conflict with the Gauls and again during the invasion by Hannibal in the Second Punic War.

Founded perhaps around 220-200 BC the initial influence of Rome was military and commercial. Strategically located, the town protected cities to the south. Belluno also became a supplier of iron and copper. Already within the Roman sphere of influence, the town was juridically and politically incorporated into the Roman Republic by the second century BC.

Sometime between the death of Julius Caesar and the ascent of Augustus, Bellunum became a Roman municipium and its people were ascribed to the Roman tribe Papiria. The town was ruled by quattorviri juri dicendo, by quattorviri aedilicia potestate, and by a Council of Elders. Under Augustus, it became part of Regio X Venetia et Histria. Among its citizens were Caius Flavius Hostilius and his wife Domitia, whose 3rd century sarcophagus lies next to the church of San Stefano.

After the fall of the Western Roman Empire, it was ruled by the Lombards (6th century) and the Carolingians (8th century); the famous Belluno Treasure in the British Museum dates from this period. From the late 9th century it was ruled by a count-bishop and it received a castle and a line of walls. Later it was a possession of the Ghibelline family of the Ezzelino. After having long contended the nearby territory with Treviso, in the end Belluno gave itself to the Republic of Venice during the War of Padua (1404). The city was thenceforth an important hub for the transport of lumber from the Cadore through the Piave river. It remained Venetian until 1797.

After the fall of the Venetian Republic, Belluno was an Austrian possession, until it was annexed to the Kingdom of Italy in 1866.

The cathedral was severely damaged by the earthquake of 1873, which destroyed a considerable portion of the town, though the campanile stood firm.

== Geography ==
The ancient city of Belluno rises above a cliff spur near the confluence of the Torrente Ardo and the Piave River. To the north is the imposing Schiara range of the Dolomites, with the famous Gusela del Vescovà (Bishopric's needle), and mountains Serva and Talvena rising above the city. To the south, the Venetian Prealps separate Belluno from the Venetian plain. Also to the south is the Nevegal, in the Castionese area, a skiing resort.

=== Climate ===
Belluno has a warm-summer humid continental climate (Köppen climate classification: Dfb). The average annual temperature is 10.8 °C (51 °F), and the average annual precipitation is 1,128 mm (44 in).

Climate data for Belluno, Veneto (IT)
Month	Jan	Feb	Mar	Apr	May	Jun	Jul	Aug	Sep	Oct	Nov	Dec	Year
Mean daily maximum °C (°F)	3.3 (37.9)	6.2 (43.2)	11.1 (52.0)	15.5 (59.9)	19.9 (67.8)	24.0 (75.2)	26.5 (79.7)	26.0 (78.8)	22.4 (72.3)	16.3 (61.3)	9.6 (49.3)	4.5 (40.1)	15.4 (59.8)
Daily mean °C (°F)	−0.4 (31.3)	1.9 (35.4)	6.5 (43.7)	10.7 (51.3)	14.9 (58.8)	18.7 (65.7)	20.9 (69.6)	20.5 (68.9)	17.3 (63.1)	11.8 (53.2)	5.9 (42.6)	1.2 (34.2)	10.8 (51.5)
Mean daily minimum °C (°F)	−4.1 (24.6)	−2.4 (27.7)	1.8 (35.2)	5.9 (42.6)	9.9 (49.8)	13.4 (56.1)	15.3 (59.5)	14.9 (58.8)	12.2 (54.0)	7.3 (45.1)	2.1 (35.8)	−2.2 (28.0)	6.2 (43.1)
Average precipitation mm (inches)	45 (1.8)	52 (2.0)	77 (3.0)	97 (3.8)	130 (5.1)	120 (4.7)	115 (4.5)	102 (4.0)	98 (3.9)	116 (4.6)	105 (4.1)	71 (2.8)	1,128 (44.3)
Average precipitation days	5	5	7	11	13	13	11	10	8	9	8	6	106
Source: Enea

== Hamlets ==
Antole, Bes, Bolzano Bellunese, Caleipo-Sossai, Castion, Castoi, Cavessago, Cavarzano, Cet, Chiesurazza, Cirvoi, Col di Piana, Col di Salce, Collungo, Cusighe, Faverga, Fiammoi, Giamosa, Giazzoi, Levego, Madeago, Miér, Nevegal, Orzes, Pedeserva, Pra de Luni, Rivamaor, Safforze, Sala, Salce, San Pietro in Campo, Sargnano, Sois, Sopracroda, Sossai, Tassei, Tisoi, Vezzano, Vignole, Visome.

== Quarters ==
Baldenich, Borgo Garibaldi (or Via Garibaldi), Borgo Piave, Borgo Prà, Cavarzano, Lambioi, Mussoi, Quartier Cadore, San Lorenzo, San Pellegrino, San Francesco, Via Cairoli, Via Feltre-Maraga, Via Montegrappa.

== Monuments and places of interest ==
- The Duomo (Cathedral, 16th century), with the 18th-century bell tower designed by Filippo Juvarra. The church's plan is attributed to the Venetian architect Tullio Lombardo
- Palazzo dei Rettori (1491)
- The red edifice of the Communal Palace
- The Bishop's Palace, erected in 1190 by the count-bishop Gerardo de' Taccoli
- The Fountain of Piazza del Duomo
- Baroque church of San Pietro (1326), originally in Gothic style. It includes five paintings by Andrea Schiavone, three by Sebastiano Ricci.
- Palazzo del Capitano
- The 16th-century church of San Rocco
- Santo Stefano church, housing several 15th-century paintings by local masters. It also includes an Adoration of the Magi, from Tiziano's workshop.
- The Romanesque church of San Biagio
- Porta Dojona and Porta Rugo: gates in the ancient walls
- Santa Maria dei Battuti: 16th-century church
- Piazza dei Martiri: is the commercial heart of the city and the living room of the Belluno people, with a Renaissance style.

== Society ==
=== Demographic evolution ===
Historical population

Year	Pop.	±%
1861	?	—
1871	15,971	—
1881	15,935	−0.2%
1901	19,050	+19.5%
1911	22,342	+17.3%
1921	27,119	+21.4%

Year	Pop.	±%
1931	26,739	−1.4%
1936	25,547	−4.5%
1951	29,160	+14.1%
1961	31,403	+7.7%
1971	34,484	+9.8%
1981	36,634	+6.2%

Year	Pop.	±%
1991	35,572	−2.9%
2001	35,050	−1.5%
2011	35,591	+1.5%
2021	35,395	−0.6%

Source: Data from ISTAT

As of 2025, Belluno has a population of 35,543, of which 48.1% are male and 51.9% are female, compared to the national average of 49.0% and 51.0% respectively. Minors make up 13.2% of the population, and seniors make up 28.1%, compared to the national average of 14.9% and 24.7% respectively.

=== Foreign ethnic groups and minorities ===
On 1 January 2025, foreigners resident in the municipality were 3,135, i.e. 8.8% of the population.: Below are the largest groups consistent

1. Ukraine, 561
2. Romania, 493
3. Morocco, 229
4. Albania, 213
5. China, 183
6. Brazil, 135
7. Moldova, 131
8. Nigeria, 74

== Infrastructure and transport ==
State roads lead from Belluno to Feltre, Treviso, Ponte nelle Alpi and Vittorio Veneto.

Belluno railway station, at Piazzale Vittime delle Foibe (formerly Piazzale Stazione),. forms part of the Calalzo–Padua railway. It was opened in 1912, replacing an earlier station opened in 1886. Its passenger building, designed by the architect Roberto Narducci, was constructed in 1928 and is served by regional trains operated by Trenitalia as part of the service contract stipulated with the Veneto Region.

The bus station is also at the Piazzale Vittime delle Foibe (formerly Piazzale Stazione), next to the railway station. Mobility within the municipality of Belluno and province is guaranteed by Dolomiti Bus.

== Sport ==
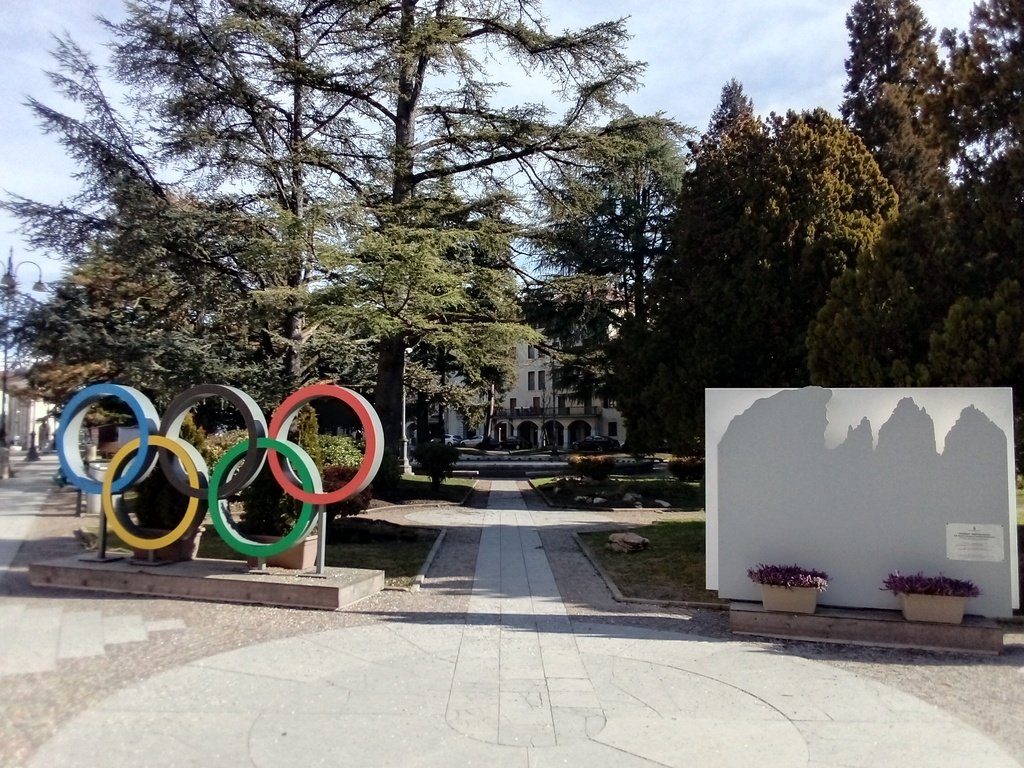
Piazza dei Martiri 2026 Winter Olympics and Paralympics logo

=== Cycling ===
Five times Belluno was the stage arrival site of the Giro d'Italia, the first in 1938, the last in 1966. To these must be added three stages with arrival in Nevegal. On 24 May 2011 the Belluno-Nevegal time trial, the 16th stage of the Giro d'Italia, took place entirely in the municipal area.

=== Milan Cortina 2026 Winter Olympics and Paralympics ===
A large screen has been installed in Piazza dei Martiri which will allow citizens and visitors to follow the Games competitions for free..

== Notable people ==
- Marco Paolini (b. 1956), stage actor
- Dino Buzzati (1906–1972), novelist and journalist, born in Belluno
- Pope Gregory XVI (1765–1846), born in Belluno
- Andrea Brustolon (1662–1732), sculptor
- Ippolito Caffi (1809–1866), painter
- Sebastiano Ricci (1659–1734), painter
- Marco Ricci (1676–1730), painter
- Luigi Luca Cavalli-Sforza (1922–2018), human geneticist and pioneer of the Human Genome Diversity Project, resided and died in Belluno
- Pope John Paul I (1912–1978)
- Bernardino Vitulini, painter
- Charles DeRudio, Italian aristocrat and later American soldier who fought in the 7th U.S. Cavalry at the Battle of the Little Bighorn.
- Andrea Bristot (b. 2001), racing driver

== Twin towns and sister cities ==
Belluno is twinned with:

- Cervia, Italy
- Bend, United States

== See also ==
- Province of Belluno
- Dolomiti Bellunesi National Park
- Roman Catholic Diocese of Belluno-Feltre
- Col Visentin
