= Catholic Marian movements and societies =

Organizations within Roman Catholicism

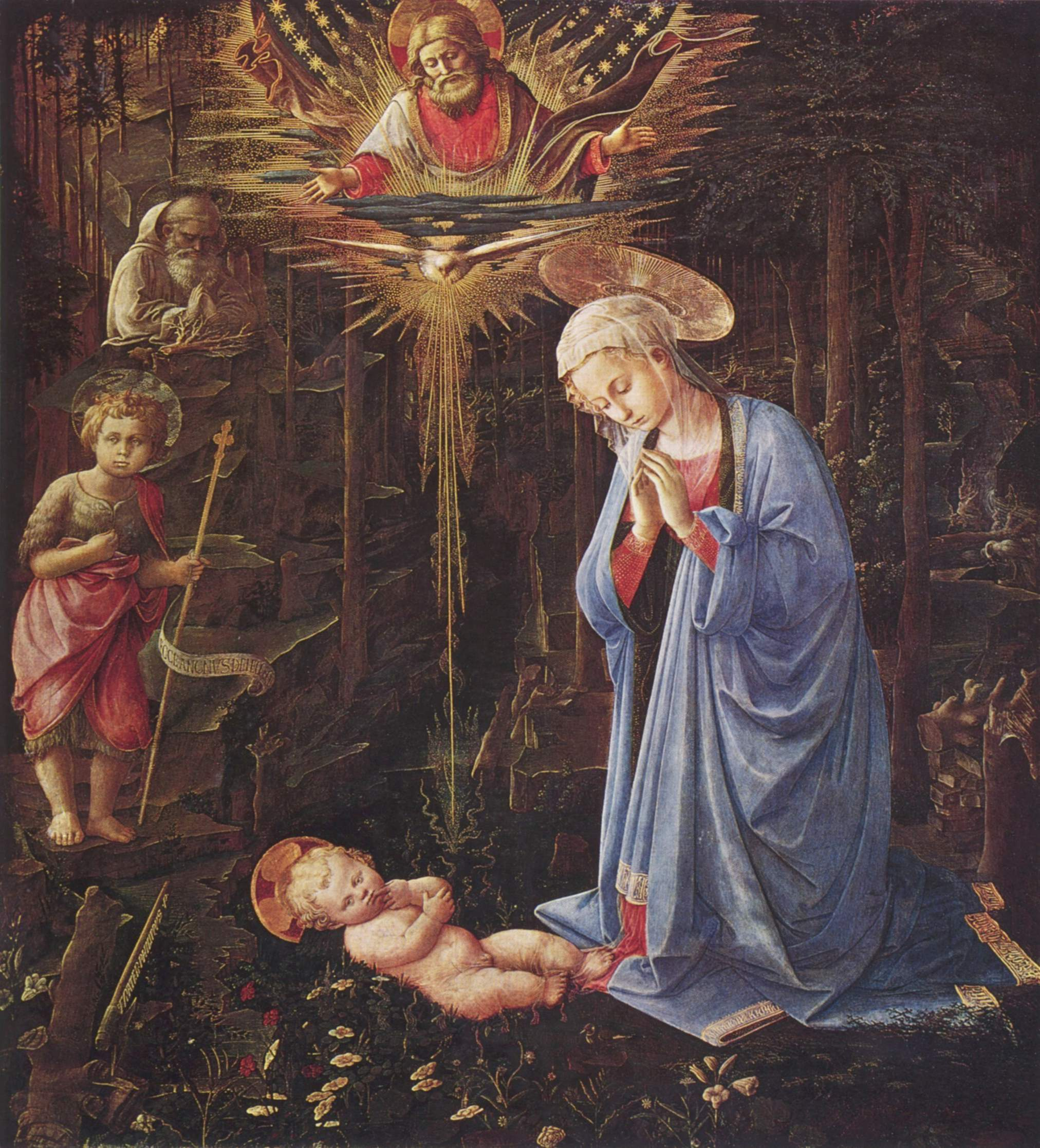
Madonna, Filippo Lippi, 1459

Catholic Marian movements and societies have developed from the veneration of the Blessed Virgin Mary by members of the Catholic Church. These societies form part of the fabric of Mariology in the Catholic Church. Popular membership in Marian organizations grew significantly in the 20th century, as apparitions such as Our Lady of Fátima gave rise to societies with millions of members, and today many Marian societies exist around the world. This article reviews the major Marian movements and organizations.

== Sodality of Our Lady ==
The Sodality of Our Lady was formed in 1563 in Rome by members of the Society of Jesus and has remained the official Marian society of the Holy See for centuries. In 1584, Pope Gregory XIII issued a papal bull commending this Sodality, granting it indulgences and establishing it as the mother Sodality. The Bull Gloriosae Dominae of Pope Benedict XIV increased the privileges of the sodality and the 1948 Apostolic Constitution Bis Saeculari of Pope Pius XII summarized the historical and contemporary relevance of the sodality.

Over several centuries the organization listed many saints, several popes and various royal figures as members. Until the Second Vatican Council in 1965, the Sodality of Our Lady or the Children of Mary as it was known, was a well-known part of the life of Catholic Communities worldwide. After the Second Vatican Council, many sodalities were transformed by the Jesuits, who redirected their policies towards social concern. Since then, the number of active sodalities has dwindled, as other Marian organizations have grown.

== Religious institutes ==
=== Marians of the Immaculate Conception ===
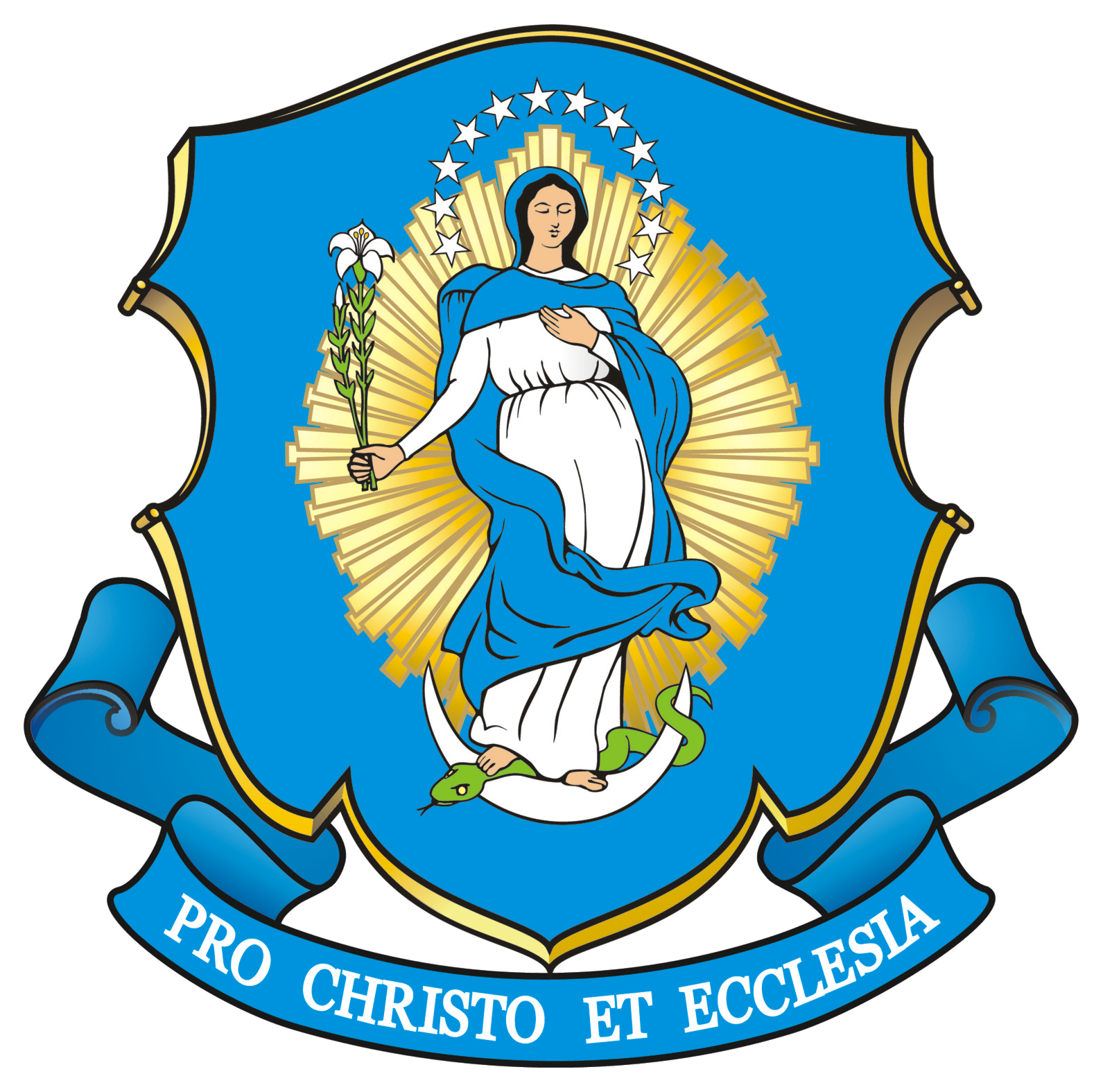
Coat of arms of the Marian Fathers

Also known as the Congregation of Marian Fathers of the Immaculate Conception of the Most Blessed Virgin Mary, this is a community of more than 500 Roman Catholic priests and brothers in 19 countries on 6 continents. They are a religious institute and pledge support to the Pope. Their aim is to spread devotion to the Blessed Virgin Mary as the Immaculate Conception, pray for the souls in purgatory and undertake a variety of apostolic work. Marians were the first Catholic men's religious institute dedicated to the honor of Mary's Immaculate Conception.

The organization was formed in 1673 by Saint Stanislaus Papczyński (beatified in 2007, canonized in 2016). Pope Innocent XII granted his approval for the institute in 1699 with solemn vows under the French Rule of the Ten Virtues of the Blessed Virgin Mary.

Over the next 200 years, the institute was caught up in the wars and turmoil in Europe and was saved in 1909 by Blessed George Matulaitis-Matulewicz who as a youth had been brought up in a village where Marians staffed the local parish. The experience had left him with a lifelong respect and admiration for the Marian Fathers. The new Constitutions for the institute were approved by Pope Pius X in 1910, and it grew thereafter.

Although it is now an international organization, the Marians still have strong roots in Poland, (e.g. the Sanctuary of Our Lady of Licheń) and place a great deal of emphasis on spreading the messages of Divine Mercy of Saint Faustina Kowalska.

=== Company of Mary ===
The Company of Mary, also called the Montfort Missionaries is the earliest Marian society based on the influence of Saint Louis de Montfort. The organization was formed in 1705 by Saint Louis himself with just one missionary disciple, Mathurin Rangeard.

Five months after his ordination, in November 1700, St Louis wrote: "I am continually asking in my prayers for a poor and small company of good priests to preach missions and retreats under the standard and protection of the Blessed Virgin".

During the intervals between his missions Montfort wrote the Rule of the Company of Mary (1713). After he died in 1716, two young priests and sometime collaborators, Father Adrien Vatel and Father Rene Mulot continued his mission. From 1718 till 1781 the "Mulotins", although few in number, gave over 430 missions throughout western France, most of which lasted a month.

After the French Revolution Montfort's community was reorganized by Father Gabriel Deshayes, elected superior general in 1821. He received from Pope Leo XII a brief of praise for the Company of Mary and for the Daughters of Wisdom, which had also been formed by de Montfort with the help of Blessed Marie Louise Trichet. The company has since grown to an international congregation of missionary priests and brothers serving in nearly 30 countries and numbering near 1,000 men.

=== Marianists ===
The Marianists, also called the Society of Mary was founded in 1817 by Blessed William Joseph Chaminade, a priest who survived the persecutions of Catholics during the French Revolution. There are currently 500 priests and over 1,500 religious in the organization.

The Society is one of the four branches of the Marianist Family. Along with the other branches, the Marianist Brothers and Priests look to Mary as a model for faith and spirituality, and they feel that the best ways to live a spiritual life are to share their faith with others, work with the poor, and educate and nourish the mind, the body, and the soul.

Marianists can be classified as priests, teaching brothers, or working brothers, but, regardless of classification, most members of the institute work in schools or programs for young people. In all of their educational institutions, the Characteristics of Marianist Education guide the curriculum.

The society has many affiliated organizations, such as: the Daughters of Mary Immaculate and the Marian Alliance. The society has branches on every continent.

=== Marists ===
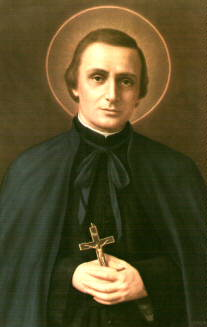
Saint Peter Chanel, martyr

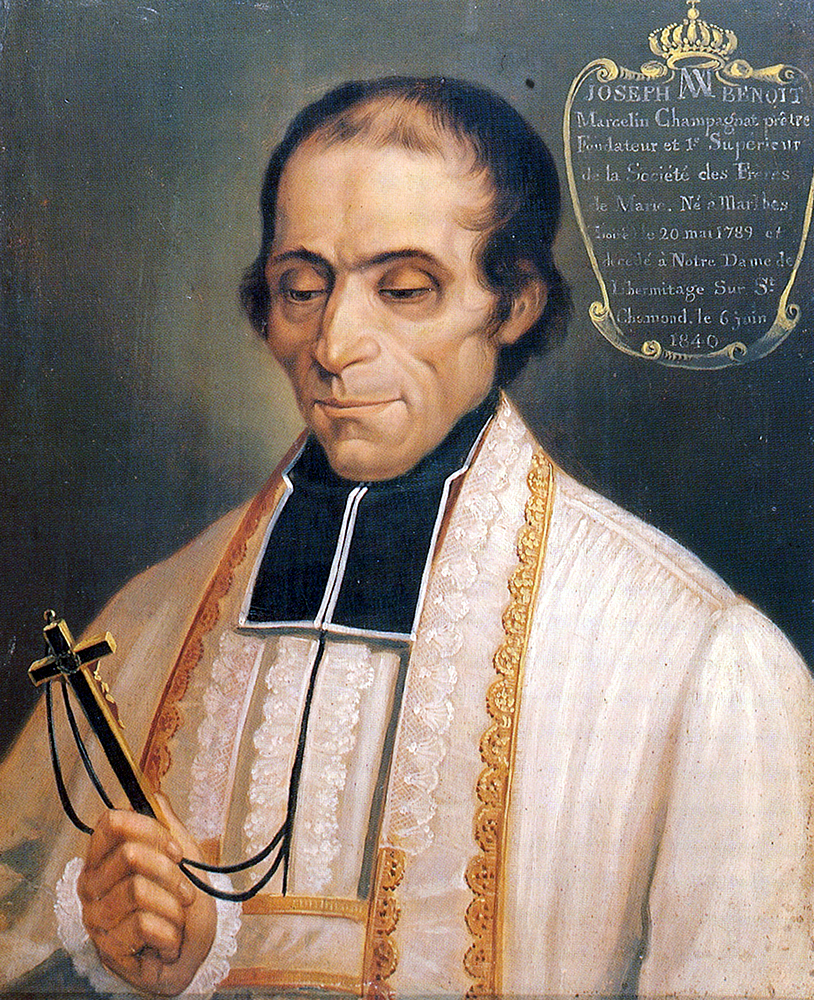
St. Marcellin Champagnat, Founder of the Marist Brothers

The Marists were founded by Father Jean-Claude Colin in France in 1816.

Pope Gregory XVI, approved the religious institute in 1836. The Little Brothers of Mary and the Sisters of the Holy Name of Mary, commonly called Marist Brothers and Marist Sisters, were reserved for separate institutes. Father Colin was elected Superior General in 1836, and on that same day the first Marist professions took place, Saint Peter Chanel, Colin, and Saint Marcellin Champagnat being among those professed. Saint Peter Chanel, was later martyred on the island of Futuna.

The society's name derives from the Blessed Virgin Mary whom the members attempt to imitate in their spirituality and daily work. The post-nominal initials of the Society are S.M., which sometimes leads to confusion with another religious institute of the same name (Society of Mary), but known as the Marianists.

Outside France, their first field of labour was the Vicariate Apostolic of Western Oceania, comprising New Zealand, Tonga, Samoa, the Gilbert (now known as Kiribati) and Marshall Islands, Fiji, New Caledonia, New Guinea, the Solomon and the Caroline Islands. The society has since grown to an international organization. and there are around 1000 Marists worldwide.

=== Marist Brothers ===
The Marist Brothers are a religious institute of brothers and affiliated lay people founded near Lyon in France in 1817 by Saint Marcellin Champagnat, a young French priest of the Marist Fathers.

The Marist Brothers are not clerics, but are devoted to educational work throughout the world and now conduct primary and secondary schools, academies, industrial schools, orphanages and retreat houses in 77 countries on five continents: Europe, Africa, America, Asia, and Oceania.

The Marist Brothers have had ministries in over 100 different nations. Presently there are approximately 4300 brothers in 76 countries on 5 continents, working directly and sharing their mission and spirituality with more than 40,000 lay Marists, and together educating close to 500,000 children and young people.

In 2007, the Holy See beatified 47 Marist Brothers from the dioceses of Burgos, Cartagena, Girona, Lleida, Palencia, Pamplona and Tudela, San Sebastian, Solsona, Terrassa, Teruel and Albarracin, Urgell and Vic who died in the Spanish Civil War.

== Early 20th century ==
=== Schoenstatt Movement ===
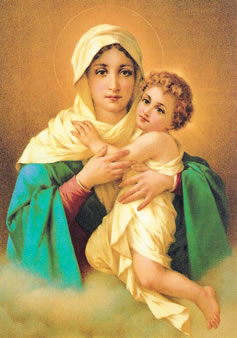
Madonna, Luigi Crosio, 1898

The Schoenstatt Movement was founded in Germany in 1914 by Father Joseph Kentenich as a means of bringing spiritual renewal to the Catholic Church. It is named after a small village near Koblenz, Germany. Schoenstatt emphasizes a strong devotion to the Blessed Virgin Mary, upholding her as a perfect example of love and purity. Schoenstatt seeks to invite the Blessed Virgin (and, hence, her divine Son, Jesus Christ), into the home by establishing a spiritual Covenant of Love with her. It encourages its members to have the faith and purity of children, and to think of Mary as their mother.

A central point in the movement dynamics and faith is the devotion to the Shrine, based on the first shrine in Schoenstatt where the movement started with a special devotion to Mary and of which there are dozens of replicas around the world. The movement is now active in several countries besides Germany, especially in South America and India and it is involved in various apostolic actions, including missionary work, charity, and education.

Many groups have been formed within the movement where people can join anything from loose groups with sparse meetings to religious institutes. The organization reports that there are hundreds of Schoenstatt youth groups throughout the world and that overall it has close to one million followers.

=== Militia Immaculata ===
The Militia Immaculata was founded in 1917 by St. Maximilian Maria Kolbe OFM Conv. while a Franciscan seminarian in Rome. There he witnessing an anti-clerical demonstration by Freemasons celebrating their second centenary. Besides protest with by handing out pamphlets the streets, the protest overtook St. Peter's Square with signs and banners that read of Satan's reign over St. Michael and the Pope. Maximilian went to his superior to ask permission to go and speak to the head Mason. His superior told the bold young friar that he should instead go to the chapel and pray.

Turning to the Immaculata as Queen and Mother, he desired to become her "Knight" ready for whatever she asked of him. He presenting the idea of forming the "Militia of the Immaculata" (or M.I.) to his Jesuit spiritual director, as well as his Franciscan Superior at the house of studies in Rome, and was encouraged to proceed. The purpose of the M.I. is to draw souls back to the knowledge and importance of the Immaculate Conception of the Blessed Virgin Mary, and to how every soul can easily enter into this consoling mystery through their own personal Act of Consecration to the Immaculata.

On Oct. 16th 1917, the eve of the Feast of St. Margaret Mary Alacoque, Maximilian Kolbe, along with six like-minded friars gathered in prayer around a statue of Our Lady of Full of Grace and began to write up the Charter of the "Knights of the Immaculata," which is deeply rooted in the 800-year-old teachings/spirituality of the Franciscan Order. They took as their emblem the "Medal of the Immaculate Conception" or the "Miraculous Medal" as it later become known.

In 1919 the M.I. was blessed by Pope Benedict XV, and in 1922 the Vicar of Rome, Cardinal Pomilii, approved the M.I. as a "pious union". In 1926 Pope Pius XI granted indulgences to the M.I. in Rome, where the international college of the Order was established as a Primary Center, and in 1997 on the 80th anniversary of the founding of the M.I. the Holy See erected the M.I. as an International Public Association of the Faithful. The M.I. is open to all Catholics, religious and laity, young and old. Its purpose is to bring about renewal in individuals and throughout society through the mediation of the Mother of God, Mary Immaculate.

To become an M.I. member one has to simply make an Act of Total Consecration to the Immaculata, enroll at a M.I. center, wear or carry a Miraculous Medal, and renew one's Consecration daily.

=== Legion of Mary ===
Formed in 1921 in Dublin, Ireland by Frank Duff, The Legion of Mary was first only open to women, but men joined as of 1929. The legionaries first started out by visiting hospitals, and in 1928 Duff formulated its basic rules.

The organization spread out of Ireland and started to grow after Pope Pius XI expressed praise for it in 1931. The Venerable Edel Mary Quinn spearheaded the spread of the organization in Africa during the 1930s and 1940s and Legion of Mary currently claims three million active members worldwide, and estimates its auxiliary members about ten million. Both Quinn and Duff are in the beatification process. Members must be practicing Catholics.

The spirituality of the Legion of Mary is based on the approach of Saint Louis de Montfort as put forward in his book True Devotion to Mary. Saint Louis de Montfort's approach of "total dedication" to Christ through devotion to the Virgin Mary also influenced popes such as John Paul II.

The essential aim of the Legion of Mary is the sanctification of its members through prayer, the sacraments and devotion to Mary and the Trinity, and of the whole world through the apostolate of the Legion.

Along with attending a weekly meeting, members of the Legion of Mary promise to perform two hours of substantial active legionary work. The weekly work assignments are done in pairs and the results of the work and reported back on at the following meeting. The characteristic and preferred work of the Legion of Mary is home to home visitation. Home to home visitation enables Legionaries to show forth the Blessed Virgin's motherly concern for the spiritual wellbeing of every one of her children.

=== Blue Army of Our Lady of Fatima ===
The Blue Army was founded in 1947 by Rev. Fr. Harold V. Colgan in New Jersey, United States. Inspired by the message of Our Lady of Fátima he focused the organization on devotion to the Immaculate Heart of Mary, daily recitation of the Rosary and righteous observance of the duties of one's state of life.

Author John Haffert assisted Colgan and began delivering conferences on the message of Fátima and the Blue Army. He also edited the "Scapular Magazine" that added one million new members to the organization.

In May 1947 Colgan met Pope Pius XII who approved of and blessed the organization. In 1950 there were one million enrolled members, in 1953 five million, and currently the numbers are beyond twenty million.

As the Blue Army grew into an international organization, it was transformed into the World Apostolate of Fatima, the decree of erection for it being signed in October 2005. In February 2006, the World Apostolate of Fátima held an official ceremony for the consignment of the decree and the approval of its statutes at the Pontifical Council for the Laity in Rome. The World Apostolate of Fátima is now headquartered in Fátima, Portugal.

=== Our Lady's Rosary Makers ===
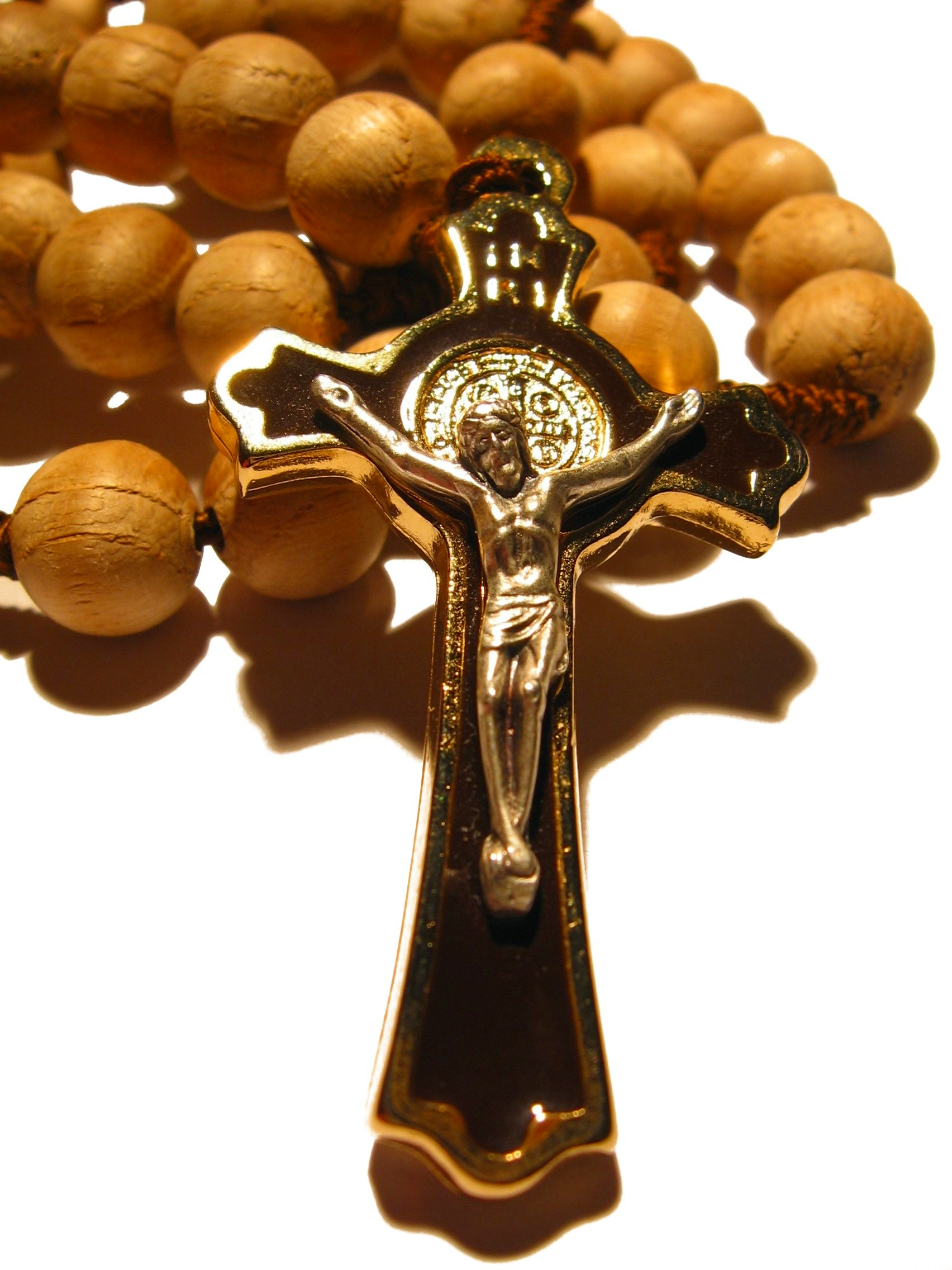
Rosary beads with Crucifix

This organization was formed in 1949 in Louisville, Kentucky by Sylvan Mattingly, a Xaverian Brother who, inspired by the message of Our Lady of Fátima, decided to form a rosary making club. The organization started modestly, with $25 donated by an old couple for a typewriter and was based in the basement of St. Xavier High School. Sylvan Mattingly died two years after he formed the club, but over time it grew in the U.S. and around the world.

Our Lady's Rosary Makers now has about 17,000 members, in the U.S. and other countries, who make and distribute roughly 7 million cord and chain rosaries annually for missions around the world. Over the years, the members Our Lady's Rosary Makers have distributed hundreds of millions of free rosaries to Catholic missions worldwide.

The core of Our Lady's Rosary Makers operation is the bimonthly newsletter called Our Lady's Messenger which reaches approximately twenty thousand people. There is no central control over the rosary-making activity, and Catholic missionaries worldwide who are in need of rosaries just post their requests in the newsletter. Other members then select which missionaries they are inspired to send rosaries to by reading the newsletter. The missionaries simply wait until packages of Rosaries arrives in the mail from various members.

== Late 20th century ==
=== Mariological Society of America ===
The Mariological Society of America (MSA) is a theological society dedicated to the study of the Virgin Mary along with an interest in encouraging Marian catechetics and Marian spirituality in the Americas. It is a Catholic theological association dedicated to studying and making known the role of the Blessed Virgin Mary in the mystery of Christ and in the Church and in the history of salvation. Through its annual meeting and in its publication, Marian Studies, the society seeks to promote original research in Mariology, Marian doctrine and devotion.

The Mariological Society of America was founded by Fr. Juniper B. Carol, O.F.M., in October 1949 with the support of Charles Balic, O.F.M. The charter members gathered for the first meeting in Washington, D.C., in January 1950. Since that time, the MSA has met annually in various cities throughout the United States. In 1954, the society was recognized as a corporation "organized exclusively for charitable, religious, educational and scientific purposes." Listed in the Official Catholic Directory as one of the national organizations of the United States Catholic Conference. The proceedings of the annual meeting are published in Marian Studies.

=== Marian Movement of Priests ===
The Marian Movement of Priests was founded by Father Stefano Gobbi in 1972, on the 55th anniversary of Our Lady of Fátima. According to the organization, its members now include over 400 Catholic cardinals and bishops, more than 100,000 Catholic priests, and several million lay Catholics worldwide.

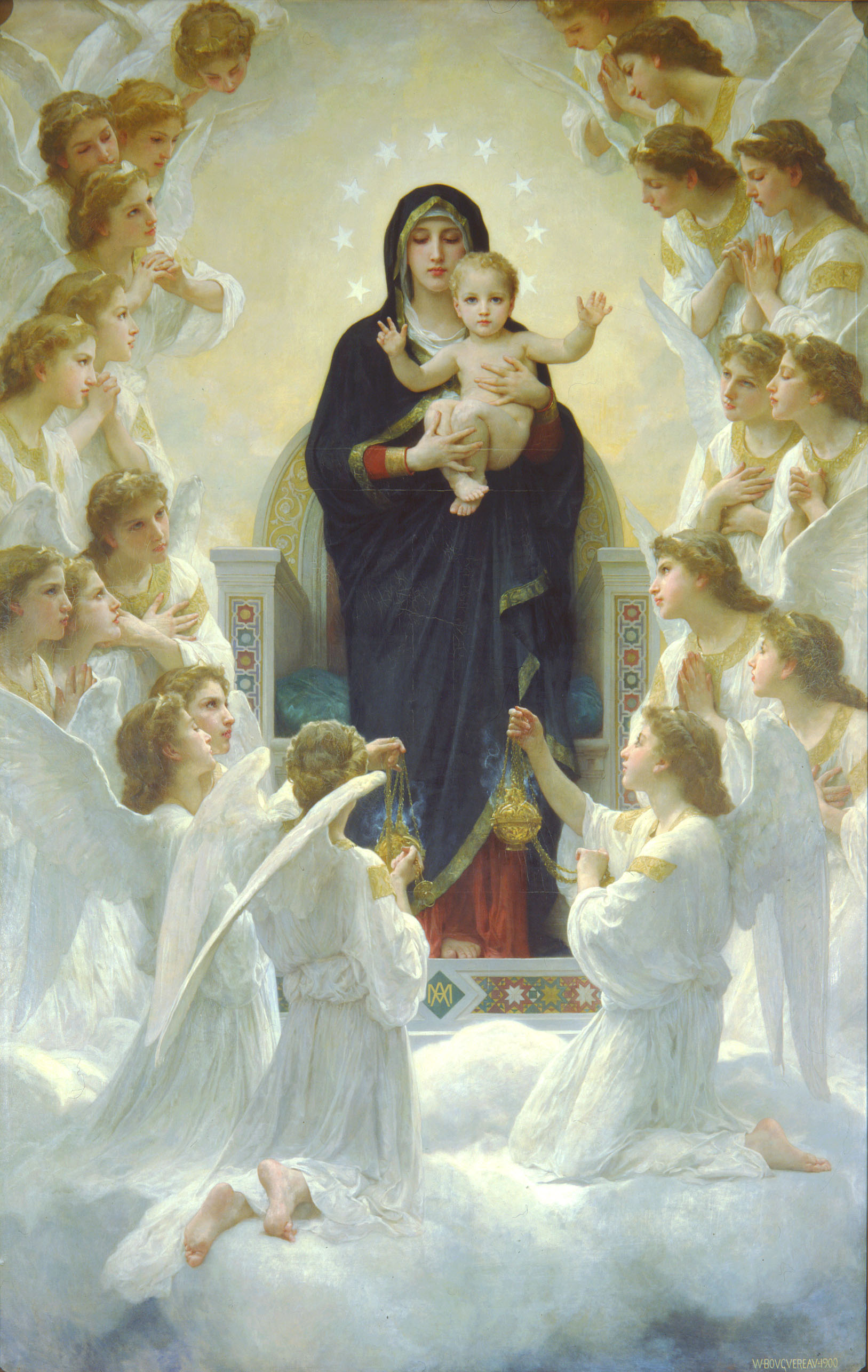
Madonna with Angels, Bouguereau, 1900

Father Gobbi had not claimed a Marian apparition, but had reported interior locution from the Virgin Mary, i.e. an internal voice from the Blessed Virgin that urged him to have confidence in the Immaculate Heart of Mary and to gather those priests that would be willing to consecrate themselves to Immaculate Heart of Mary and be strongly united with the Pope and the Catholic Church.

In 1973, he wrote his interior locutions as messages which were published in the book: "To the Priests, Our Lady's Beloved Sons" and received imprimaturs from three Catholic cardinals. Pope John Paul II, who had a personal devotion to the Virgin Mary, used to meet with and celebrated mass with Father Gobbi in his private papal chapel in the Vatican on an annual basis for several years. In November 1993, Pope John Paul II also provided an official papal blessing for the American branch of the organization in St. Francis, Maine but did not offer an imprimatur for the book.

The movement places special emphasis on the power of praying the Holy Rosary and Eucharistic Adoration as effective means of strengthening the Church. Father Gobbi has held cenacles of varying sizes on every continent. The cenacle he held in Ōita, Japan on June 2, 1978, was for a few priests and nuns while the cenacle he held in Mexico City on November 27, 1994, was attended by 20,000 people in the city stadium.

=== Fatima Family Apostolate ===
The Fatima Family Apostolate was founded in 1986 by Father Robert J. Fox. Headquartered in Hanceville, Alabama, the apostolate publishes a quarterly magazine, Immaculate Heart Messenger. The mission of the Fatima Family Apostolate is to promote the true message of Fatima and the sanctification of family life.

== See also ==
- Religious of the Virgin Mary
- Roman Catholic Marian churches
- Roman Catholic Marian music
- Queen of Angels Foundation
