= Marian Movement of Priests =

Catholic Marian association

The Marian Movement of Priests (MMP) is a fraternity, open to both men and women, who are devoted to the Blessed Virgin Mary. Although most members are of the Catholic faith, the organization accepts anyone to become a member regardless of religious background. According to Fr. Stefano Gobbi, a priest from Dongo Italy, he formed the movement in 1972. at the request of Mary. The MMP describes itself a continuation of the messages given by Our Lady of Fatima. According to the MMP, its members now include over 400 Catholic cardinals and bishops, more than 100,000 Catholic priests, and several million lay Catholics worldwide.

== Origins ==
On May 8, 1972, Father Gobbi, an Italian priest from Milan, was on a pilgrimage to Fátima, Portugal and was praying in the Shrine of Our Lady of Fátima for some priests who had given up their vocations and were reportedly planning to rebel against the Roman Catholic Church. On that day he reported his first alleged interior locution from the Virgin Mary. Father Gobbi reported that the inner voice urged him to have confidence in the Immaculate Heart of Mary and to gather those priests that would be willing to consecrate themselves to Immaculate Heart of Mary and be strongly united with the Pope and the Catholic Church. According to Father Gobbi he prayed to Saint Mary for a confirmation of the inner voice, which he reported as receiving later in May 1972 while praying in the Church of the Annunciation in Nazareth.

After consultations with his spiritual advisor, in October 1972 he and two other priests met in a church in Gera Lario in Como, Italy and published a notice of the movement in some Catholic and local newspapers. In September 1973, twenty-five of the eighty Catholic priests who had by then joined the movement held the first national gathering of the MMP in San Vittorino near Rome. Beginning in 1974, Father Gobbi began holding cenacles of prayer for priests and Catholics in general.

The MMP is now based in Milan, Italy, with branches worldwide. The Marian Movement of Priests in the United States was established in 1975, and is based in St. Francis, Maine.

== Handbook ==
In July 1973, Father Gobbi began to write his interior locutions as messages which he attributed to the Virgin Mary. The messages from July 1973 to December 1997 were published in the book: "To the Priests, Our Lady's Beloved Sons." These messages have now become the de facto hand book of the MMP.

There are 604 messages in the book and they span over 24 years of Father Gobbi's life. The book shows the dates (and if relevant the locations) of the messages and is thus also a record of Father Gobbi's travels as he holds prayer cenacles.

Most messages have a somewhat maternal tone and they often ask the faithful to follow Jesus and not deviate from his path. For instance, message number 110 of September 25, 1976, warns against diluting the words of the Gospel and creating “your own Gospel with your own words” rather than following the original teachings of Jesus.

== The view from the Vatican ==
In October 1994, Archbishop Agostino Cacciavillan wrote a letter in which he stated that some officials within the Sacred Congregation for the Doctrine of the Faith at the Vatican had informed him that they believe Father Gobbi's locutions to be his own meditations and not messages from the Virgin Mary. To that end, Father Gobbi was asked to refer to the locutions as his own meditations rather than messages from the Virgin Mary. But Father Gobbi said that he could not, in good conscience, do so for he believed the messages to be true interior locutions and he sought further clarification from the Holy See.

To date, there is no formal record that the Congregation for the Doctrine of the Faith has taken an official position regarding Father Gobbi's messages. The MMP therefore continues to meet regularly in Rome with the permission and participation of Catholic cardinals and bishops who attribute the locutions to Holy Mary.

Pope John Paul II, who had a personal devotion to the Virgin Mary, met with and celebrated mass with Father Gobbi in his private papal chapel in the Vatican on an annual basis for several years. In November 1993, John Paul II provided an official papal blessing for the American branch of the MMP in St. Francis, Maine, but did not offer an imprimatur for the book. An imprimatur was later issued by Archbishop Emeritus of Guayaquil, Apostolic Administrator of Ibarra, on March 19, 1996, on the Solemnity of St. Joseph.

On May 1, 2024, Fr. Stefano Gobbi officially became the Servant of God. Cardinal Oscar Cantoni, diocesan bishop, presided the solemn Eucharistic Celebration with the opening of the diocesan process for the cause of beatification and canonization of Fr. Gobbi.

== Spiritual values ==
The fundamental concept of the MMP today remains the same as the basic concept expressed in the initial interior locution that Father Gobi reported on May 8, 1972, in Fátima, Portugal. The concept is to encourage priests and laity to unite with the Pope through the Immaculate Heart of Mary to strengthen the Catholic Church.

The three fundamental spiritual values of the MMP are formally expressed in Father Gobi's circulars 21, 23, and 24 as: personal consecration to the Immaculate Heart of Mary, unity and devotion to the Pope, and leading the faithful to trust the Virgin Mary.

The MMP does not have its own distinct doctrine for consecration to the Immaculate Heart of Mary but relies on the general consecration doctrine provided by the Holy See. The concept of unity and devotion to the Pope also embeds the concept of a return to the original divine teachings of Jesus which the MMP views as being diluted through modern human interpretations and multiple rationalizations. The concept of leading the faithful to the Virgin Mary is essentially expressed in message number 25 of November 1, 1973, in which priests are asked to gather the faithful around them as "invincible cohort" to follow the path of Jesus.

The MMP places special emphasis on the power of praying the Holy Rosary and Eucharistic Adoration as effective means of strengthening the Church.

== Cenacles ==
In the tradition of the MMP, Saint Mary calls the members of the MMP to meet in "Cenacles" as the Apostles met in prayer and the celebration of the Holy Eucharist in the upper room (cenacle) when the Holy Spirit descended upon them. They are called to pray to Jesus through the Blessed Virgin Mary. They are also called to include after each rosary decade two prayers: the Act of Love ("Jesus, Mary, and Joseph! We love you! Save souls! We offer up every heartbeat and every breath as a thousand Acts of Love") and the Prayer for the Holy Spirit ("Come Holy Spirit, by the most powerful intercession of your dearly beloved spouse, the Immaculate Heart of Mary"). Furthermore, during Cenacles they are to make personal consecrations to Mary. The Act of Consecration is recited at every cenacle.

Father Gobbi has held cenacles of varying sizes on every continent. The cenacle he held in Ōita, Japan, on June 2, 1978, was for a few priests and nuns while the cenacle he held in Mexico City on November 27, 1994, was attended by 20,000 people in the city stadium.

== See also ==
- Roman Catholic Marian Movements and Societies
- Fatima Movement of Priests
