= John Haffert =

American Roman Catholic author

John Mathias Haffert (23 August 1915 – 31 October 2001) was an American Roman Catholic author and editor. He wrote several books, mostly on Roman Catholic themes, co-founded Catholic societies, edited Catholic magazines and lectured on Catholic issues.

== Biography ==
Haffert was born on 23 August 1915. He received his high school and college education at Mt. Carmel College, a Carmelite seminary, and then began his career as an author and lecturer. Haffert was the co-founder of the Blue Army of Our Lady of Fatima, a Roman Catholic Marian Society which was approved by Pope Pius XII and has about 25 million members worldwide. Haffert was assisted in the creation and Daily operations of Blue Army of Our Lady of Fatima by Father Venard Poslusney. He was the editor of "Scapular Magazine" which helped enroll one million Americans in the Blue Army of Our Lady of Fatima and in prayer for the Soviet Union.

Haffert was a strong advocate of the message of Our Lady of Fatima and he worked with Fatima visionary Sister Lucia dos Santos to develop the "Fatima Pledge" in 1946. This later became the "Blue Army Pledge", in 1948. Haffert spoke often on topics concerning the Miracle of the Sun. One of Haffert's books, "That Wonderful Poem", endorses The Poem of the Man God by Maria Valtorta, in which he explains how the Bishop of Fatima introduced him to these writings.

Haffert died at 86 in the United States, on 31 October 2001.

== Bibliography ==
- John Haffert, 1950 "Russia Will Be Converted" ASIN B0007E2BI8
- John Haffert, 1961 Meet the Witnesses of the Miracle of the Sun ISBN 978-1877905353
- John Haffert, 1966 Night of Love ISBN 978-0-911988-34-5
- John Haffert, 1970 Sex and the Mysteries ISBN 978-0-911988-01-7
- John Haffert, 1971 Sign of Heart ISBN 978-0-911988-03-1
- John Haffert, 1971 Brother and I ISBN 978-0-911988-12-3
- John Haffert, 1974 There is Nothing More ISBN 978-0-911988-40-6
- John Haffert, 1981 Dear Bishop ISBN 978-0-911988-42-0
- John Haffert, 1982 Who is the Woman ISBN 978-0-911988-47-5
- John Haffert, 1989 The Meaning of Akita ISBN 978-1-890137-05-2
- John Haffert, 1992 That Wonderful Poem
- John Haffert, 1993, Her Glorious Title ISBN 1-890137-17-0
- John Haffert, 1993 Her Own Words ISBN 978-1-890137-19-9
- John Haffert, 1993 Finally Russia ISBN 978-1-890137-18-2
- John Haffert, 1996 Explosion of the Supernatural ISBN 978-1-890137-15-1
- John Haffert, 1997 Now The Woman ISBN 978-1-890137-04-5
- John Haffert, 1998, Sign of Her Heart ISBN 1-890137-11-1
- John Haffert, 1998, God's Final Effort ISBN 1-890137-41-3
- John Haffert, 1998 The Day I Didn’t Die ISBN 978-1-890137-12-0,
- John Haffert, 1999 Too Late ISBN 978-1-890137-39-7
- John Haffert, 1999 To Prevent This ISBN 978-1-890137-16-8
- John Haffert, 2000 Meet The Witnesses ISBN 978-1-890137-56-4
- John Haffert, 2000 Great Event ISBN 978-1-890137-42-7
- John Haffert, 2000 Deadline: The Third Secret of Fatima ISBN 978-1-890137-49-6
- John Haffert, 2000 The World's Greatest Secret ISBN 978-0-911988-60-4
- John Haffert, 2000 Peacemaker ISBN 978-1-4325-1924-7

== See also ==
- Blue Army of Our Lady of Fatima
- Our Lady of Fatima

== Media ==
- John Haffert on the Miracle of Fatima

In 1996, John Haffert spoke about Fatima and his book “Meet the Witnesses” in which he personally interviewed nearly 200 witnesses to the Fatima Miracle, describing their detailed witness accounts.
