= Venard Poslusney =

Father Venard Poslusney (1 December 1917 – 15 December 2005) was a Roman Catholic figure and author who gained recognition through many conferences, lectures and seminars (some of which were with Archbishop Fulton J. Sheen in the 1970s). Poslusney was a "life-long" friend of John Haffert (co-founder of the Blue Army of Our Lady of Fatima) and played a significant role in the formation and daily operations of the Blue Army.

== Life ==
Venard Poslusney was born in Pittsburgh, Pennsylvania, on December 1, 1917. He attended Saint Nicholas Grade School in Millvale, Pennsylvania. Entering high school, he joined the Carmelites at Mount Carmel Preparatory Seminary in Niagara Falls, Ontario. He made his simple profession of vows at the Carmelite Novitiate house in New Baltimore, Pennsylvania, on August 15, 1936; and his solemn vows on August 15, 1939.

Entering college, he attended Mount Carmel College in Niagara Falls, Ontario. He also attended De Paul University, Chicago, Illinois, where he received his bachelor's degree in Spanish in 1947. He had a great interest in music and entered the Chicago Conservatory of Music, in Chicago, Illinois, where he received both Bachelor's and master's degrees in Voice and Composition in 1949 and 1951 respectively.

Father Venard Poslusney, O.Carm., was ordained a priest on May 28, 1942, in Washington, D.C. After ordination, Father Poslusney began his career as Carmelite priest as formator for the province in New Baltimore, Pennsylvania. In 1944 he went to Chicago, Illinois, where he taught at Mount Carmel High School while completing his degrees at the Chicago Conservatory. In 1950 he continued his teaching of seminarians at the Carmelite Junior Seminary located then in Hamilton, Massachusetts. Two years later, he returned to New Baltimore where he taught at the Carmelite Novitiate there.

In 1960, Father Poslusney moved to Wolfniz, Austria, where he began a semi-eremitical life. In 1969, after nine years in Wolfniz, he returned to the United States where he continued living a contemplative life style with a limited retreat ministry in prayer and contemplation, and the celebration of healing Masses, in New Baltimore, Pennsylvania. During that time he was also involved in Charismatic Renewal. After four years in New Baltimore, Father Poslusney began a prayer apostolate at the Carmel Retreat Center in Mahwah, New Jersey. There he served in healing and retreat ministry for three years until 1981, when he pursued a contemplative life in Saddle Brook, New Jersey. In Saddle Brook, Father Venard conducted weekly prayer groups with an accompanied Charismatic healing Mass, mini retreat days on centering prayer and contemplation and many Lay Carmelite retreats in the New Jersey area, where he lived until his death.

Father Venard was the author of a number of books on prayer, as well as many articles on spiritual subjects. For over ten years, Father Venard Poslusney, O.Carm., had a cassette tape ministry on which all phases of spiritual life were discussed. Over twenty-two series of taped topics were discussed with some series having more than 15 individual taped sessions. The most noted series was on the Poem of the Man God by Maria Valtorta. He was credited with conducting over 300 conferences that were recognized throughout the United States, Canada, Austria and Rome. He resided in New Jersey for more than thirty years and had served the Lay Carmelite community as spiritual director and chaplain, founding the communities in New Jersey, Florida, and California. Towards the end of his life he acted as an advisor to the Holy Office in the area of Private Revelation.

== Works ==
- Father Venard Poslusney, 1964 The Imitation of Christ, According to St. John of the Cross PGEN 132/5843
- Father Venard Poslusney, 1973 "Attaining Spiritual Maturity for Contemplation"
- Father Venard Poslusney, 1994 Prayer, Aspiration and Contemplation ISBN 0-8189-0300-7
- Father Venard Poslusney, 1997 "Union With The Lord In Prayer"
