= Venard =

Venard is both a given name and a surname. Notable people with the name include:

- Venard Poslusney (1917–2005), American Roman Catholic priest
- Marc Venard (1929–2014), French historian
- Stephen Venard (c. 1823–1891) American lawman
- Théophane Vénard (1829–1861), French Catholic missionary
