= The Book of Azariah =

Book by Maria Valtorta

The Book of Azariah is a book by the Italian author and Roman Catholic mystic Maria Valtorta. It was written in 1946 and 1947 in Viareggio, Italy, where Valtorta was bedridden for several decades.

In the book, Valtorta does not provide a specific biblical reference to Azariah himself, but simply refers to the spirit as her guardian angel.

The book consists of a set of “lessons”, provided by Azariah on Sundays, with starting points in the 58 Masses of the Roman Missal of the Catholic Church prior to the reforms of the Second Vatican Council in 1965.

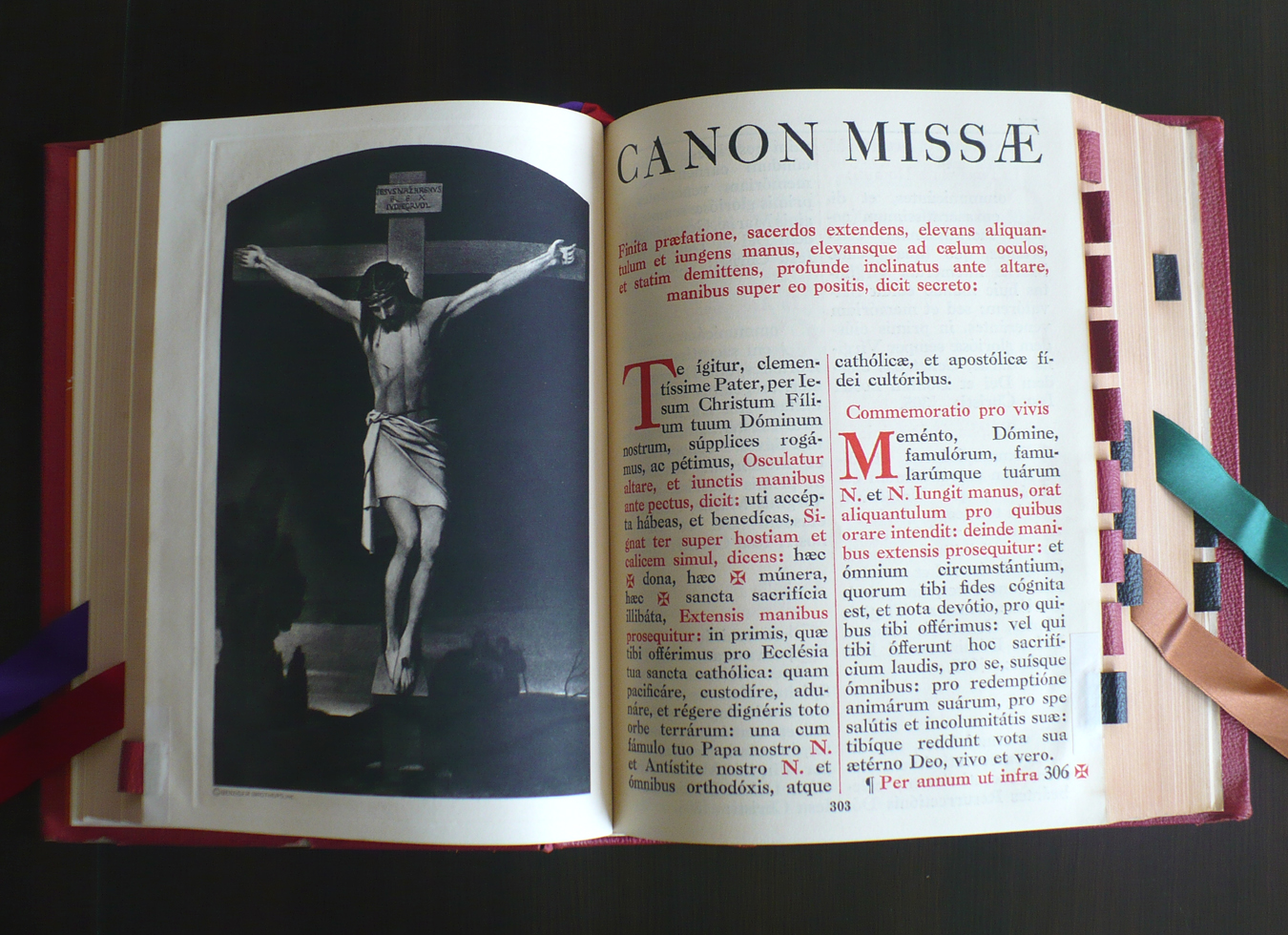
A Roman Missal. The Book of Azariah is a set of lessons based on the Gospels of Sundays Masses, attributed to Maria Valtorta's guardian angel.

For instance, on May 26, 1946, the fifth Sunday after Easter, the Mass’ proper Gospel was John 16:23-30 and Azariah's comments, in part, are quoted as follows:

Generosity ought to be responded to with generosity. We, spirits who see men from the height of the Heavens and follow them with divine light as our guide, view the wonderful prodigies provoked by this competition in generosity between the soul giving itself to Him who has given Himself to it and God, who gives Himself even more to reward the generous one giving himself to Him. And we can truly say, in response to the questions of many about the humanly inexplicable ascents and descents of souls, that the rise or fall is linked to and follows from the degree of generosity with which a soul adheres to the Lord.

== Sources ==
- Maria Valtorta, 1972 The Book of Azariah, ISBN 88-7987-013-0
- Maria Valtorta, 1949 The Poem of the Man God, ISBN 88-7987-013-0
