= Carinci =

Carinci is a surname. Notable people with the surname include:

- Alfonso Carinci (1862–1963), Roman Catholic archbishop
- Jan Carinci (born 1959), Canadian footballer
