= Robert J. Fox =

American poet

Fr. Robert J. Fox
- Fox in Portugal, 1992
- Born: December 24, 1927; Watertown, South Dakota, United States
- Died: November 26, 2009 (aged 81); United States

Robert Joseph Fox (December 24, 1927 – November 26, 2009) was an American priest of the Roman Catholic church. He was an author of religious books and tapes, and appeared on many Roman Catholic television programs and conferences. Fox also served as a diocesan priest for several rural towns in South Dakota.

Fox was the Director of the International Fatima Family Apostolate and Youth for Fatima Pilgrimages, editor of the Immaculate Heart Messenger. He began the Marian Congress in the United States which is held annually

== Early life ==
Fox was born in Watertown, South Dakota on December 24, 1928. His parents, Aloysius and Susie Emma Fox, were farmers. Fox, the youngest of eight siblings, was raised in a religious family, and he later recalled "I never remembered when I did not want to be a priest." His father died while Fox was still a baby and he grew up working with his siblings to preserve the farm throughout the Great Depression.

Before attending school, Fox was encouraged by his mother to study to become a priest like their local pastor Fr. William O'Meara. Fox stated that his "mother put the thought in my mind" of joining the priesthood before the first grade, "She mentioned it only two times in my life, but it stuck." He recalled going with her to town when she would buy groceries and that she left him free for an hour and he "would go [to] the Catholic Church and genuflect and spend time before Jesus. Even then I could feel the Real Presence of Jesus in the tabernacle. That drew me to the priest-hood."

== Schooling ==
Fox attended Immaculate Conception School in Watertown, a parochial school run by Franciscan nuns. There, Fox learned of Saint Pius of Pietrelcina, an Italian monk. His story helped inspire him to pursue the priesthood. He then attended Watertown High School in Watertown. Fox later recalled his continued interest in learning about the Catholic faith during this time

"We didn't have a Catholic high school in Watertown, but our family did receive the National Catholic Register. Msgr. William Smith used to have beautiful articles explaining the faith. I would wait for it to arrive in the mail every Tuesday and I would read it cover to cover."

In his senior year of high school Fox suffered a farm accident with a hay rake that broke his leg. During his recovery, Fox solidified his decision to become a priest.

After graduating from high school in 1947, Fox entered St John's University. Fox recalled that "In those days St. John's taught the traditional Catholic faith", and incoming student's were required to take a religious placement exam." Despite having no formal religious education, he scored 17th out of 350 incoming college freshman, which he attributed to his frequent reading of the National Catholic Register. In 1950, after two terms at Saint John's, Fox transferred to Saint Paul Seminary in Saint Paul, Minnesota. When not in class, he would watch Archbishop Fulton J. Sheen's television program Life Is Worth Living on the Seminary's television set. Fox graduated from St. Paul in 1955.

== Priesthood ==
Fox was ordained into the priesthood on April 24, 1955, at the Cathedral of St Joseph for Diocese of Sioux Falls by Bishop William Brady.

After his ordination, Fox's first assignment was as an assistant priest in Milbank, South Dakota. In January 1959, he was transferred to St. Anthony's Parish in Hoven, South Dakota; and in August 1959 to Sacred Heart Parish in Yankton, South Dakota. In 1961, Bishop Lambert Hoch assigned Fox as pastor of St. Anthony's Parish in Bristol. South Dakota. Fox wrote letters and articles for Catholic publications and he soon became a weekly columnist for the National Catholic Register.

After the Second Vatican Council's promulgation of the 1964 Decree on Ecumenism, Bishop Hoch authorized Fox to hold an ecumenical Advent prayer service with three Protestant denominations. Over six hundred people attended and the event was covered by the national media, with Fox being called a "new breed" of priest. In 1965 Fox was sent to St. Joseph's Parish in Mobridge, South Dakota; and in 1969 returned to St. Lawrence in Milbank.

Responding to the Vatican Council's call for a greater commitment to Catholic catechesis, Fox became concerned that some people's responses were diluting Catholic doctrine. In response to this, he wrote Religious Education; Its Effects, Its Challenges Today. Reception was mixed. In Milbank, he attempted to implement his ideas from his book into a Catholic school. He was opposed by both the school board and principal, but received encouragement from Cardinal John Wright, Prefect of the Congregation for the Clergy, who requested six copies of Fox's book.

== Youth for Fatima Pilgrimages ==
In 1971 Fox was assigned to St. Bernard Parish in Redfield, South Dakota, where he built a shrine in honor of the Virgin Mary. In 1974 the National Pilgrim Virgin Statue was brought to the Diocese of Sioux Falls for exhibition This event inspired Fox to lead a pilgrimage group to visit the Sanctuary of Fatima in Fatima, Portugal . Fox later told a reporter that at Fatima

"I asked Our Lady, 'What do you want of me?' Those were always the first words spoken by Lucia when Our Lady appeared to her. I had the overwhelming conviction that Our Lady wanted me to teach the fullness of the Catholic faith to young people wherever I could using the Fatima message as the vehicle in my instruction."

On returning to South Dakota, Fox produced a tape series for the World Apostolate of Fatima. In 1975, he led a Holy Year Pilgrimage from Fatima to Rome. While in Europe, Fox visited what is claimed to be the crypt of Mark the Evangelist in Venice Fox reported hearing "a voice within" while at the tomb, telling him to conduct pilgrimages. He then developed the idea to make a Youth Pilgrimage program to Fatima run like a retreat. This was the beginning of his Youth for Fatima Pilgrimages which traveled to Fatima annually.

Fox created media to encourage young men to consider a vocation of the Catholic priesthood. He was given permission to establish priestly formation program named the "Sons of the Immaculate Heart". In 1982 with the encouragement of his bishop and the support of Cardinal Francisco Pironio, head of the Congregation for Religious, seven candidates took up residence at the rectory in Redfield. Fox also create a catechism course called "Sharing the Faith", all while continuing to do his parish work, writing, and Fatima pilgrimages.

In 1984, on a trip to Fatima, Fox collapsed with a severe case of pneumonia that effected his voice. Bishop Paul Dudley disbanded the Sons of the Immaculate Heart and sent Fox to Immaculate Conception Parish in Waubay, South Dakota, to recuperate and relearn how to speak. During this period, Fox wrote "Immaculate Heart of Mary" expounding on the work of Louis de Montfort. He also built his second Marian shrine while at Waubay.

In 1985 Fox arrived at St. Mary of Mercy parish in Alexandria, South Dakota, and began building a shrine to Our Lady of Fatima. The shrine expanded to become the "Fatima Family Shrine" and includes "areas dedicated to Our Lady of Fatima, Our Lady of Guadalupe, the Sacred and Immaculate Hearts, angels adoring the Holy Eucharist, Saint Joseph, the Christ Child blessing the world, plus a Divine Mercy Shrine."

== Fatima Apostolate ==
Responding to Pope John Paul II's November 22, 1981, encyclical Familiaris Consortio (On the Role of the Christian Family in the Modern World), and with the encouragement of the Pontifical Council for the Laity, Fox founded in 1986 the Fatima Family Apostolate (FFA). He served as its first director and as the editor of its quarterly magazine Immaculate Heart Messenger. He became chairman of a Fatima Youth Seminar in Detroit and founded a youth division of the World Apostolate of Fatima. He also wrote Catholic Truth for Youth.

Fox gave many conferences on Catholic Mariological teachings at Fatima, and in Australia, Poland, Syria, Mexico, Italy, and the United States. On a visit to Moscow, Fox met Tadeusz Kondrusiewicz, Archbishop and Metropolitan of the Roman Catholic Archdiocese of Moscow. Fox presented the Archbishop with a statue of Our Lady of Fatima "with Our Lady's assurance that Russia will be converted and 'In the end, my Immaculate Heart will triumph.'"

In September 1987, Fox hosted the first annual Marian Congress in America at Alexandria. Among the notables that have spoken at Marian Congresses are Bishop Fabian Bruskewitz, John Corapi, Mother Angelica, Father Harold Cohen and Jeff Cavins. In addition Administrating Bishops of Fatima, Portugal have attended the Congresses - Bishop Alberto Amaral (who dedicated the "Fatima Family shrine" in 1987) and his successor Bishop Serafim S. Ferreira e Silva.

=== Later years ===
In 2003, Fox retired to Hanceville, Alabama near the Shrine of the Most Blessed Sacrament. In retirement Fox became involved in the Roman Catholic media network EWTN Among Fox's numerous television and radio appearances were on "Mother Angelica Live", "The Abundant Life"; "Bookmark"; Daily Mass; WEWN shortwave radio and Sirius Satellite Radio; and Relevant Radio. He continued to publish and remained editor of the Immaculate Heart Messenger Magazine. In 2005, Fox published an autobiography A Priest is a Priest Forever that coincided with his fiftieth anniversary in the priesthood.

Shortly after arriving in Alabama, Fox met John C. Preiss, who began writing for the Immaculate Heart Messenger.

In 2008, Preiss encouraged Fox to move the FFA headquarters to Hanceville. The Fatima Family Center was built, comprising a gift shop, conference room and storage for Fox's many books. Shortly before his death from cancer in 2009, Fox named Priess to succeed him as President of FFA.

== Bibliography ==
- Religious Education: Its Effects, Its Challenges Today, Daughters of St. Paul, 1972.
- The Catholic Prayerbook, Our Sunday Visitor, 1974.
- Renewal for All God's People, Our Sunday Visitor, 1975.
- Charity, Morality, Sex and Young People, Our Sunday Visitor, 1975.
- The Marian Catechism, Our Sunday Visitor, 1976.
- Saints and Heroes Speak, Our Sunday Visitor, 1977.
- A Prayer Book for Young Catholics, Our Sunday Visitor, 1977.
- Principles of spiritual growth]: Phase 2 : module on guilt (Genesis 2 bridges the gap between the old and the new), Intermedia Foundation - 1978
- Teenagers and Purity; Teenagers and Going Steady; Teenagers Looking toward Marriage, St. Paul Editions, 1978.
- Ten sermons on the Mother of God,: In light of Vatican II and Our Lady of Fatima, with addendum: Four articles on Communism and the Church, AMI Press - 1978
- Catholic Truth for Youth, Ave Maria Press, 1978.
- A World at Prayer, Our Sunday Visitor, 1979.
- A Catechism of the Catholic Church: Two Thousand Years of Faith and Tradition, Franciscan Herald, 1980.
- A Catholic Prayer Book, Our Sunday Visitor, 1980
- Rediscovering Fatima, Our Sunday Visitor, 1982.
- Prayerbook for Catholics, Christendom Press 1982
- The Call of Heaven: Life of Stigmatist of San Vittorino, Father Gino, Christendom Publications, 1982.
- The Mary Book, Mother of Evangelism, Fatima Family Apostolate
- The call of heaven: Bro. Gino, stigmatist, Christendom Publications, 1982.
- A Prayer Book for Young Catholics, Our Sunday Visitor, 2nd ed., 1982.
- Jacinta of Fatima: Her Life As She Might Tell It, Ami Intl Pr, 1982
- St. Therese of Lisieux: Her Life As She Might Tell It, Ami Intl Pr, 1982
- St. Louis Marie Grignon de Montfort: His Life As He Might Tell It, A M I Press, 1983
- Fatima Today, Christendom Publications, 1983.
- The Catholic Faith, Our Sunday Visitor, 1983.
- Opus Sanctorum Angelorum:, AMI Press - 1983
- The Work of the Holy Angels, AMI International, 1984.
- Family Bonding Through Discipline, Fatima Family Apostolate, 1987.
- Families, Seedbeds for Vocations, Fatima Family Apostolate, 1987.
- Blessed Jacinta and Francisco, Fatima Family Apostolate, 1987.
- Immaculate Heart of Mary: True Devotion, Our Sunday Visitor, 1986.
- Guidance for Future Priests, Fatima Family Apostolate, 1988.
- A Handbook on Guadalupe, Fatima Family Apostolate, 1988.
- Until Death Do Us Part, Fatima Family Apostolate, 1988.
- National Children's Day to Honor Our Lady: Second Sunday of October : a handbook for parents, teachers and pastors, Fatima Family Apostolate, 1988.
- St. Joseph Promise, Fatima Family Apostolate, 1989.
- True Devotion to the Immaculate Heart of Mary, Fatima Family Apostolate, 1989.
- Marian Manual, Fatima Family Apostolate, 1989.
- First Saturdays, Fatima Family Apostolate, 1989.
- To Russia with Love, Fatima Family Apostolate, 1989.
- The Gift of Sexuality: A Guide for Young People, Our Sunday Visitor, 1989.
- Fox-Sight: Telling the vision of Robert J. Fox, Our Sunday Visitor, 1989.
- Mary's White League for Children, Fatima Family Apostolate, 1990.
- Illustrated Rosary Meditations for Children, Fatima Family Apostolate, 1990.
- Protestant Fundamentalism and Born Again Catholic, Fatima Family Apostolate, 1990.
- Fatima Today - The Third Millennium, Fatima Family Apostolate, 1990, 2002.
- Mary Book: Mother of Evangelism, Fatima Family Apostolate, 1991.
- Only Heroic Catholic Families Will Survive, Fatima Family Apostolate, 1991.
- Catechism of Church History, Fatima Family Apostolate, 1991.
- The World and Work of the Holy Angels, Fatima Family Apostolate, 1991.
- Covenant With Jesus, Fatima Family Apostolate, 1992.
- Kolbe St. of the Immaculata, Fatima Family Apostolate, 1993.
- A Man Called Francis, Fatima Family Apostolate, 1996.
- Mary Through the Ages, Fatima Family Apostolate, 1996.
- A Young Catholic's Apology for the Faith, Fatima Family Apostolate, 1995.
- Jesus - Light of the World, Fatima Family Apostolate, 1997.
- Catechism on Mary and the Pope Who Changed the World, Fatima Family Apostolate, 1998.
- Manual of Prayers, Our Sunday Visitor 1998
- Fundamentals of Faith, Fatima Family Apostolate, 1999.
- Mary in Mid-America Shrine Book, Fatima Family Apostolate, 1999.
- Documents on Fatima & Memoirs of Sister Lucia, Fatima Family Apostolate, 2000.
- The Intimate Life of Sister Lucia, Fatima Family Apostolate, 2001.
- Light from the East - Miracles of Our Lady of Soufanieh, Fatima Family Apostolate, 2002.
- Reclaiming Your Children for the Faith , Fatima Family Apostolate, 2003.
- Catechism in Poetry , Fatima Family Apostolate, 2003.
- Messages from the Heart of Your Mother, Fatima Family Apostolate, 2004.
- A Priest is a Priest Forever - Autobiography, Fatima Family Apostolate, 2005.
- Ray Likes to Pray, Fatima Family Apostolate, 2006.
- Fatima is Forever, Fatima Family Apostolate, 2006.
- Masculinity: The Gentle Man , Fatima Family Apostolate, 2007.
- Eucharist: Heaven and Earth Unite , Fatima Family Apostolate, 2008.
- Mary Teaches the Faith at Fatima, Fatima Family Apostolate, 2009.

== External sources ==
- Fatima Family Apostolate profile of Father Fox
- Profile of Robert J Fox Contemporary Authors Online, Gale, 2005. Reproduced in Biography Resource Center. Farmington Hills, Mich.: Thomson Gale. 2005.
- Fatima Family Apostolate
- Immaculate Heart Messenger Magazine Summary
