= Stefano Gobbi =

Italian Roman Catholic priest

Servant of God Stefano Gobbi
- Born: 22 March 1930; Dongo, Italy
- Died: 29 June 2011 (aged 81); Milan, Italy

Stefano Gobbi (22 March 1930 – 29 June 2011) was an Italian Roman Catholic priest and mystic. He founded the worldwide Catholic movement, the Marian Movement of Priests following what he reported as an interior locution in 1972 at the shrine of Our Lady of Fatima.

== Life ==
Gobbi was born in the Province of Como, Italy and was ordained as a priest in 1964. He later obtained a doctorate in sacred theology from the Pontifical Lateran University in Rome.

On 8 May 1972 he was on a pilgrimage to Fátima, Portugal and was praying in the shrine of Our Lady of Fatima. He reported an interior locution from the Virgin Mary. He did not claim a Marian apparition, but a locution, an inner voice. This inner voice urged him to gather other priests who would be willing to consecrate themselves to the Immaculate Heart of Mary and be strongly united with the Pope and the Roman Catholic Church. According to Gobbi, he prayed to the Blessed Virgin Mary for a confirmation of the inner voice, which he reported as receiving in May 1972 while praying in the Church of the Annunciation in Nazareth. On 13 October 1972, on the 55th anniversary of Our Lady of Fatima he and two other priests formed the Marian Movement of Priests in a church in Gera Lario near Como, Italy.

== Growth of the movement ==
The Marian Movement of Priests grew and by September 1973 included over 80 priests when it held its first national meeting at San Vittorino, near Rome. In 1974, Gobbi started to hold prayer cenacles in Italy for priests and laity, and later held prayer cenacles all over the world. During the cenacle Catholics pray to Jesus Christ through Saint Mary, since it was through her that the Church, the Body of Christ, was born. The Marian Movement is now based in Milan, with branches worldwide. The Marian Movement of Priests in the United States was established in 1975, is based in St. Francis, Maine.

In July 1973, Gobbi began to write his reported interior locutions as messages which he attributed to the Virgin Mary. The messages from July 1973 to December 1997 were published in Gobbi's book To the Priests, Our Lady's Beloved Sons. Cardinal Bernardino Echeverría Ruiz, OFM, Cardinal Ignatius Moussa Daoud and Cardinal John Baptist Wu provided their imprimatur for the book. The messages have a pronounced apocalyptic tone.

As to the writings of Father Gobbi, the Congregation for the Doctrine of the Faith has advised "that they are not the words of our Blessed Mother, but his private meditations for which he assumes all the theological, spiritual and pastoral responsibility".

Prior to his death, Gobbi was officially based in Milan, but continued to travel worldwide to hold prayer cenacles and promote the cause of the Marian Movement. He died on 29 June 2011 after suffering a heart attack earlier that month.

== Cause of beatification ==
On 28 March 2024, an official communique of the Marian Movement of Priests informed on the fact that the beatification process of Gobbi has not yet been opened and preliminary procedures require time. The faithful are "kindly requested to be cautious in not disseminating news that could give the impression that the cause for beatification has already begun".
