= True Devotion to the Immaculate Heart of Mary =

Book by Robert J. Fox

True Devotion to the Immaculate Heart of Mary is a book by Fr. Robert J. Fox on the Roman Catholic theme of devotion to the Immaculate Heart of Mary.

The book discusses devotion to the Immaculate Heart of Mary from a Trinitarian and Christological perspective. It has a nihil obstat and an imprimatur.

In May 2007 EWTN aired a book review on the program Living His Life Abundantly hosted by Johnnette S. Benkovic.

== See also ==
- Blessed Virgin Mary (Roman Catholic)
