= Sol de Fátima =

Spanish-language Catholic devotional magazine

Sol de Fátima is a Spanish-language Catholic devotional magazine published by the Blue Army of Our Lady and is devoted to the message of Our Lady of Fátima.

== Description ==
It caused controversy in the September 1985 issue when it reported that one of the Fatima visionaries, Sister Lúcia claimed that the Vatican had not complied with the Virgin Mary's request to consecrate Russia to the Immaculate Heart of Mary. This was reported to be because there was no specific mention of Russia. It was also claimed that she said that "many bishops attached no importance to it".

It is claimed that the Virgin Mary promised that the Consecration of Russia would lead to Russia's conversion and an era of peace. Many, believe Pope John Paul II fulfilled this request in 1984 by giving a blessing over the world, including Russia, shortly before the collapse of the Soviet Union. It is commonly believed that Sister Lúcia verified that this ceremony fulfilled the requests of the Blessed Virgin Mary.

== See also ==
- Fátima, Portugal
- Our Lady of Fátima
- Sanctuary of Fátima
- Parish Church of Fátima
