= National Blue Army Shrine of Our Lady of Fatima =

Shrine to the Virgin Mary in New Jersey, USA

Coordinates: 40.7307°N 75.0070°W

The National Blue Army Shrine of Our Lady of Fatima, also known as the National Blue Army Shrine of the Immaculate Heart of Mary, is a shrine to the Virgin Mary and significant place of pilgrimage for the Catholic Church. It is located in Washington Township, Warren County, New Jersey and operated by the Blue Army Association.

The shrine is centred on a 130 foot high spire, surmounted by a statue of the Virgin Mary. It contains a replica of the Holy House at the Basilica della Santa Casa in Loreto, Italy.

== See also ==
- Blue Army of Our Lady of Fátima
- List of shrines#United States
