= Our Lady's Rosary Makers =

Catholic organization in Kentucky, US

Our Lady's Rosary Makers is a non-profit Catholic apostolate in Louisville, Kentucky, USA dedicated to spreading devotion to the Virgin Mary and the Rosary. According to the OLRM Web site, its 17,000 members, in the U.S. and other countries, make and distribute roughly seven million cord and chain rosaries annually for missions around the world, and have distributed hundreds of millions of rosaries to Catholic missions worldwide.

== History ==

The organization traces its roots to Xaverian Brother Sylvan Mattingly (1882–1951), who in 1949 started making rosaries and formed a rosary-making club, which he originally named Our Lady of Fátima Rosary Making Club, at St. Xavier High School. Over the years, this club grew to become Our Lady's Rosary Makers.

== Present day ==
The plastic components are produced locally. The organization both packages and ships supplies for rosary makers requesting them, and fulfills requests for rosaries already made.

The core of Our Lady's Rosary Makers operation is the bimonthly newsletter Our Lady's Messenger, which reaches approximately twenty thousand people. By 2013, they averaged filling 6.5 million orders a year for rosary making supplies.

The bulk of the newsletter is a section called "Request for Rosaries": Catholic missionaries worldwide in need of rosaries write to Our Lady's Rosary Makers asking for their names and addresses to be published in the newsletter. The newsletter also includes news and feedback letters from missionaries. There are also requests for Rosaries from prison and hospital chaplains, religious educators, etc.

The members of Our Lady's Rosary Makers are mostly in the U.S. The makeup and characteristics of the members are diverse: some are working adults, some are blind or otherwise disabled, some are elementary school students, while others are in retirement homes. When members receive the bimonthly newsletter, they look through the list of missionaries who have requested rosaries; then make and send packages of rosaries to them. There is no central control; members select missionaries from the newsletter, and missionaries wait until packages of rosaries arrive.
