= Mariological Society of America =

Catholic theological society

The Mariological Society of America (MSA) is a Catholic theological society dedicated to the study of the Blessed Virgin Mary. Each year the society publishes the proceedings of the annual meeting in Marian Studies, a publication that contains articles addressing a particular theme connected to the role of Mary in the spiritual life of the Church, and which is subscribed to by Catholic libraries in various universities and institutions and quoted in the major media.

The society is listed in the Official Catholic Directory as one of the national organizations of the United States Catholic Conference and is sanctioned as a Roman Catholic organization. It is also one of the Mariological societies recognized by the International Pontifical Marian Academy.

== History ==
The society was founded in 1949 by Father Juniper B. Carol, O.F.M. and held its first meeting in 1950. It has since held annual meetings throughout the United States. The position of the society is that, although a Roman Catholic society, it is open to discussion and growth in mutual understanding with those of other faith traditions. The society also cooperates with universities to hold Marian exhibitions.

As of August, 2014, the president of the society is Dr. Robert Fastiggi, a professor of theology at Sacred Heart Major Seminary, Detroit, Michigan; the vice president is Sr. Danielle Peters, a Schoenstatt Sister working at the University of Notre Dame in Indiana; and the secretary is Fr. Thomas Thompson, S.M. of the International Marian Research Institute located on the campus of the University of Dayton in Ohio.

Dr Fastiggi argues that Virgin Mary's participation in the work of redemption is not solely passive, but a free, active cooperation with her divine Son.
