= Fatima Movement of Priests =

Roman Catholic movement

The Fátima Movement of Priests is a Roman Catholic movement organized by priests who follow the Marian devotion to Our Lady of Fátima, and was founded under the auspices of the Fatima Center.

== History ==
=== Fatima Center ===
The Fatima Center was founded in 1978 by the Roman Catholic priest Father Nicholas Gruner. It is a self-described "grass roots association of Catholic priests and lay people whose mission is to make known the full Message of Our Lady of Fatima, and promote devotion to the Immaculate Heart of Mary".

=== Fátima Movement of Priests ===
The movement was founded following a series of meetings among priests at three international Fátima Peace Congresses held by the Fátima Center: Tuy, Spain, and Fátima, Portugal, in October 2006; São Paulo, Brazil, in July 2007; and Madras, India, in late January, early February 2008.

The organization's stated focus is to implement the messages of Our Lady of Fátima to affect people's lives, parishes and dioceses. It is also a loose confederation of Catholic priests and bishops the world over who have resolved to make the Fátima Message more central in their own priestly lives and in their work.

The group's parent organization is the Fatima Center, founded by the Canadian priest Father Nicholas Gruner.
