= Fatima Family Apostolate =

U.S.-based Roman Catholic Apostolate

The Fatima Family Apostolate (FFA) (Fatima Family Apostolate International) is a U.S.-based Roman Catholic apostolate with headquarters in Hanceville, Alabama, founded in 1986 by Fr. Robert J. Fox and named after Our Lady of Fátima. John C. Preiss is the President.

The Fatima Family Apostolate is based in Hanceville, Alabama and operates internationally with members worldwide. It publishes a quarterly magazine, the Immaculate Heart Messenger.

== History ==
In the mid-1970s, Fr. Robert J. Fox, a priest incardinated in the Roman Catholic Diocese of Sioux Falls, founded "Youth for Fatima", an apostolate organizing thirteen-day pilgrimages to Fátima for young people. This initiative eventually grew into the Fatima Family Apostolate, formally established in 1986 with encouragement from the Pontifical Council for the Laity. Fox drew inspiration from Pope John Paul II's 1981 encyclical Familiaris Consortio (On the Role of the Christian Family in the Modern World).

While serving at St. Mary of Mercy Parish in Alexandria, South Dakota, Fox built the Fatima Family Shrine, dedicated during the 1987 Marian Year by Alberto Cosme do Amaral, Bishop of the Roman Catholic Diocese of Leiria–Fátima. The shrine was the third Marian shrine he established, following similar efforts at parishes in Redfield and Waubay. The shrine in Alexandria was dedicated during the 1987 Marian Year by Alberto Cosme do Amaral, bishop of the Roman Catholic Diocese of Leiria-Fátima and is maintained largely through freewill donations.

In September 1987, Fox hosted the first annual Marian Congress in Alexandria. The 1989 Congress was attended by Édouard Cardinal Gagnon, President of the Pontifical Council for the Family.

During a visit to Moscow, Fox presented Archbishop and Metropolitan of the Catholic Archdiocese of the Mother of God in Moscow Tadeusz Kondrusiewicz with a statue of Our Lady of Fátima as a gift to the Russian people. FFA "...considers it to have been one of its greatest honors, when Archbishop Kondrusiewicz, ...requested the FFA to finance the building of Russia's first Fatima shrine." Subsequently, the FFA funded the construction of what it describes as "Russia’s first Fatima shrine".

Fox died on November 26, 2009, in Hanceville, Alabama. Following his death, John C. Preiss, a Catholic author and convert, succeeded him as president and editor of the apostolate’s quarterly publication, the Immaculate Heart Messenger.

The FFA maintains shrines in Alexandria, South Dakota, and Hanceville, Alabama, and operates the Father Robert J. Fox to educate its visitors on the life of Father Fox and Our Lady of Fatima Museum to educate its visitors on the message of Our Lady of Fatima.

== Spirituality ==
The Apostolate's stated main goal is the sanctification of family life, guided by principles articulated in Familiaris Consortio. The Apostolate highlights the connection between the sacrament of matrimony and the Eucharist.

Members are encouraged to meet monthly for prayer and discussion of spiritual readings. The Apostolate promotes family prayer, including morning and evening prayers, prayers before meals, meditation, Scripture reading and other devotions.

== Operation ==
The FFA is governed by its Charter and guided by the Marian Manual for local chapter activities.

The organization does not collect dues, maintain a paid staff or require financial contributions from members. Communication among members primarily occurs through the Immaculate Heart Messenger magazine.

The FFA has six major segments in which members may participate according to their needs and circumstances: Married Marian Couples, Youth for Fatima, Fatima Prayer Groups, and Suffering Members for the Conversion of One's Country (for disabled people).

Internationally, the FFA has a presence in Australia and the Philippines, where an Asian regional edition of the Immaculate Heart Messenger is published.

=== Immaculate Heart Messenger ===
The Immaculate Heart Messenger is a quarterly publication founded by Robert J. Fox, a columnist for the National Catholic Register and a frequent contributor to Our Sunday Visitor, along with several other Catholic publications. Before his death, he appointed John C. Preiss as his successor. The magazine promotes conservative Catholic teachings, advocating traditional views on sexuality, marriage and family life and opposing birth control, divorce, abortion and what it deems to be indecent literature and film.

The publication is intended to educate people about the Catholic faith, encourage prayer, and promote the reading of Scripture. It features articles on Catholic doctrine, catechism, application of Church teachings in contemporary life (hermeneutics and exegesis), prayer and scripture, liturgical seasons (e.g., Lent and Advent), lives of the saints (hagiography), and personal testimonies and witnesses. It also includes news briefs, subscriber forums, Q&A sections, and meditations contributed by guest writers. Initially a full-colour, large-format (8 x 11) magazine with pictures and photographs, it later transitioned to a newsletter format.
