= The Poem of the Man-God =

1956 literary work by Maria Valtorta

- Author: Maria Valtorta
- Original title: Il Poema dell'Uomo-Dio
- Language: Italian
- Publication date: 1956
- Publication place: Italy

The Poem of the Man-God (Italian title: Il Poema dell'Uomo-Dio) is a work on the life of Jesus Christ written by Maria Valtorta. The current editions of the work bear the title The Gospel as Revealed to Me.

The work was first published in Italian in 1956 and has since been translated into many languages. It is based on about 10,000 of the over 15,000 handwritten pages produced by Maria Valtorta in her notebooks. The large majority of the work was written in about three years between January 1944 and April 1947. During these years she reported visions of Jesus and Mary, in addition to personal conversations and dictations from Jesus.

The work was placed on the (now abolished) Index Librorum Prohibitorum in 1959, and has remained controversial since its publication. Various scholars, historians and Biblical experts continue to both support and criticize the work to this day.

== Writing and publication ==
=== The handwritten notebooks ===
After writing her autobiography based on the advice of her priest, Father Romualdo Migliorini, O.S.M., in 1943 the bedridden Valtorta began handwriting a series of what she claimed were messages from Jesus. These were later typed by her priest and arranged chronologically to produce the work.

Although Valtorta wrote about 15,000 pages during the years 1943–1947, only 10,000 of these (mostly written from 1944 to 1947) were used in her main book which was at first called The Poem of the Man-God. The additional pages were later published as The Notebooks. The Poem contains over 650 reported episodes in the life of Jesus and the Virgin Mary.

=== The papal audience ===
Father Corrado Berti, O.S.M., professor at Marianum Pontifical Faculty of Theology at Rome, sent a preprint copy of the Poem to Pope Pius XII in 1947. Then on 26 February 1948, Pope Pius XII received Fr. Berti, Fr. Miglorini, and their prior Fr. Andrea Chechin in private audience which was reported in L'Osservatore Romano the next day. Fr. Berti reported that in the meeting Pius XII stated:

Publish this work as it is. There is no need to give an opinion about its origin, whether it be extraordinary or not. Who reads it will understand. One hears of many visions and revelations. I will not say they are all authentic; but there are some of which it could be said they are.

However, in 1949 the Holy Office summoned Fr. Berti and ordered him not to publish the work.

=== The imprimatur question ===
Cardinal Edouard Gagnon wrote that the statement by Pius XII at the meeting with the three priests was "the type of imprimatur granted by the Holy Father before witnesses," and that it was in complete conformity with the demands of canon law. Fr. Melançon, C.S.C., said that Gagnon's doctoral thesis in canon law gave him the qualifications to make such a determination. In contrast, Fr. Anthony Pillari said that the only valid imprimatur for the work was issued in 1993 for the Malayalam translation and does not carry over to other languages. Similarly, Rene Laurentin et al. maintain that Pius XII never took an official position beyond his original statement in the February 1948 private audience.

Pillari noted that, in 1952, ten scholars (including Archbishop Alfonso Carinci) who supported Valtorta petitioned Pius XII to take some steps to allow the publication of the work, given the opposition from the Holy Office, but Pius XII took no action. Pillari said that after the significant change brought by the 1983 Code of Canon Law (CIC/17 c. 1385), the issue of Valtorta's work having or not having an imprimatur is currently irrelevant. He pointed to the article "The End of The Imprimatur" by J. Coriden, which said that the 1983 change significantly narrowed the scope of the works needing an imprimatur, to the extent that most theological and religious writings are now exempt from the requirement to have one, except in a few cases such as specific books used for teaching theology.

=== Publication ===
According to Paul Collins, Maria Valtorta was at first reluctant to have her notebooks published but, on the advice of her priest, in 1947 she agreed to their publication. However, the initial four volume edition of the work was published without an author name.

In 1952, the two priests Migliorini and Berti found a publisher for the work, and in October of that year Maria Valtorta signed a contract with Michele Pisani, whose publishing firm was based in Frosinone, southeast of Rome. The first edition of the work was published in 1956 in Italian. Later, the firm was managed by Emilio Pisani, the son of Michele Pisani. In 2014, Emilio Pisani stated that he had spent about 50 years with the work and that by then translations into 15 languages had been published and translations into around another 15 languages were in progress. Asked by Il Giornale about the number of copies sold, Pisani responded that he did not have an exact number at hand, but there were millions of copies.

== Ecclesiastical reaction ==
=== Index of Forbidden Books ===
On 16 December 1959, the Holy Office placed the 4-volume work (the first volume entitled The Poem of Jesus, and the remaining 3 volumes titled The Poem of the Man-God) on the Index Librorum Prohibitorum. The decree was published in L'Osservatore Romano on 6 January 1960, accompanied by a front-page, anonymously written article under the heading "A Badly Fictionalized Life of Jesus". Fr. Anthony Pillari noted that the L'Osservatore Romano article stated that the work was placed on the Index because it went against rule 1385 of the Code of Canon Law which required an imprimatur prior to publication.

On 1 December 1961, an official statement by the Holy Office published in L'Osservatore Romano stated that the second edition of the Poem published in ten volumes effectively contained the same material as the previous edition and remained subject to the same prohibitions.

On 15 June 1966, the Sacred Congregation for the Doctrine of the Faith abolished the Index and all formal sanctions against reading books placed on the Index ended. The decree was published in L'Osservatore Romano by Cardinal Alfredo Ottaviani.

=== After the Index ===
On 31 January 1985 and 17 April 1993, Cardinal Joseph Ratzinger wrote two letters about Valtorta's Poem. He stated that, in his opinion, recommendation of Valtorta's work was not opportune considering it was formerly on the Index, and that it cannot be considered supernatural in origin. Fr. Anthony Pillari states that this was Ratzinger's personal opinion and not that of the Congregation for the Doctrine of the Faith, which had not held formal discussions on the issue, and hence had no juridic value.

In May 1992, Archbishop Dionigi Tettamanzi wrote to Emilio Pisani, Valtorta's publisher, and requested that the Poem include a statement that indicates the material in the work are literary forms to narrate the life of Jesus and cannot be considered of supernatural origin. Fr. Anthony Pillari states that was the personal opinion of Tettamanzi, not of the Catholic Conference of Bishops, since no formal meeting was recorded as having taken place on the subject, which caused Tettamanzi's position to have no juridic value. Pillari also states that given that Tettamazi was in Genova, he had no jurisdiction over the publisher which was in Frosinone. René Laurentin et al. state that in their opinion, Tettamanzi's letter effectively affirmed that reading the work was permitted, provided its contents were not assumed to have a supernatural origin.

== Support ==
=== Astronomical analysis ===
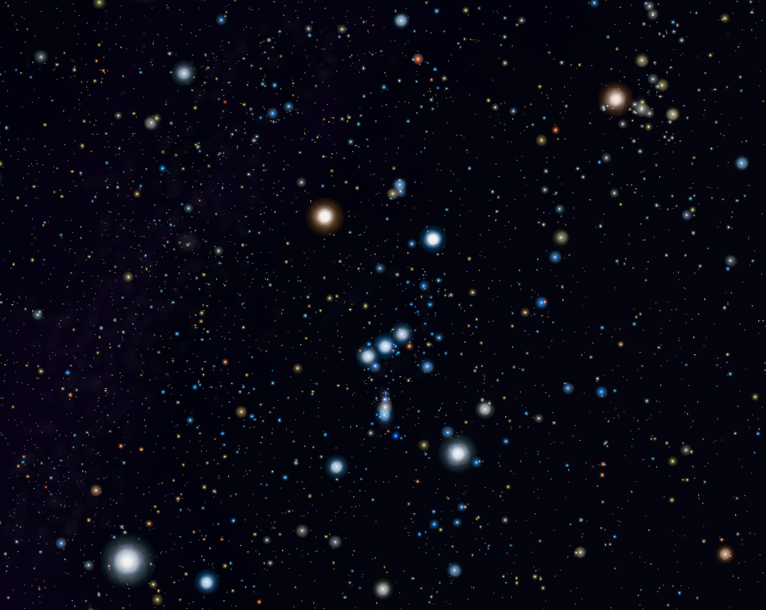
View of the constellation Orion

Emilio Matricciani, professor of engineering at the Polytechnic University of Milan, and physicist Liberato De Caro of the Italian National Research Council, state that following the earlier work of physicist Lonnie Van Zandt in 1994, they have analyzed some of the descriptions of the night sky mentioned in various parts of Valtorta's work. They state that although Valtorta's Poem includes no dates, the fact that it mentions the visibility of a three way conjunction of planets on a Sunday night in March from Gadara can lead to the partial determination of dates for that episode, given that the conjunction takes place on rare occasions.

They state that a Planetarium software system establishes that the only possibilities for this observation would be AD 31 or AD 33. They also state that other sky observations mentioned in the narrative shows that chapter 609 of the work, which describes the crucifixion of Jesus, corresponds to the date April 21, AD 34, as Van Zandt had computed. According to the authors, the estimation of the joint observability of these sky objects and the position of the moon during specific episodes would have been almost impossible without a computer system. Matricciani and De Caro also state that the date April 21, AD 34 is one of the two possible dates that Isaac Newton had computed in 1733 using a different approach based on the visibility of the crescent of the moon.

=== Geographic descriptions ===
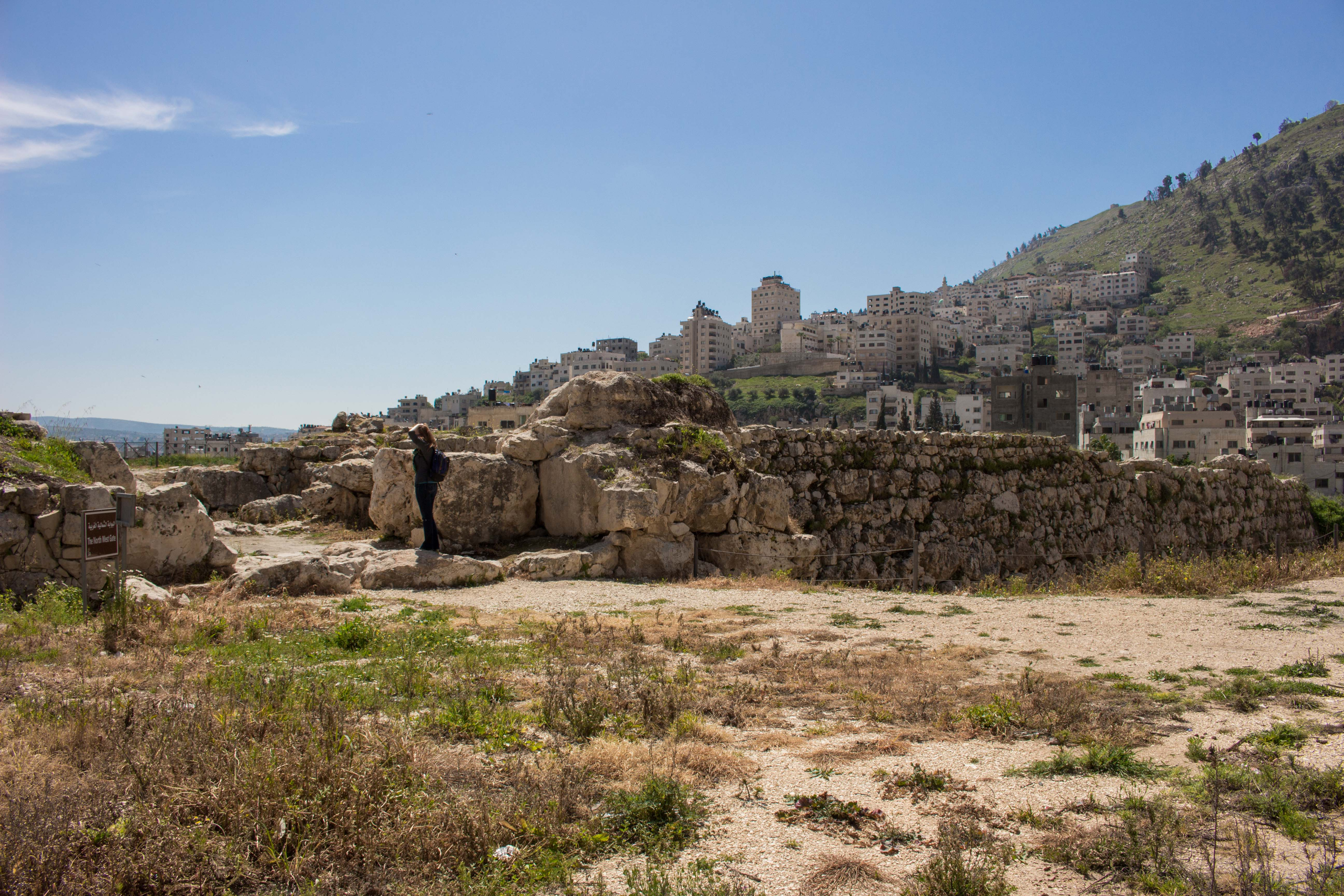
Tell Balata, identified as ancient Shechem

Gianfranco Battisti, professor of geography at the University of Trieste, analyzed and compared the geographic descriptions of ancient Palestine in the works of Anne Catherine Emmerich and Maria Valtorta. Battisti stated that Valtorta's work has many more geographic descriptions than the book attributed to Emmerich by Clemens Brentano. Battisti wrote that in his view the approximately 500 locations and toponyms in Valtorta's Poem are well placed. He stated that geographic data support Valtorta's book and her work may shed light on the current understanding of ancient geography.

As two examples of details in Valtorta's book, Battisti mentioned the account of the travel from Engannim to Shechem in chapter 193 of the Poem and the detailed description of Masada in chapters 390 and 391. He wrote that Valtorta's description of how the road from Engannim to Shechem rose through the valleys in Samaria was surprising. He also stated that in his view the details about Masada in Valtorta's work are unexpected, given what was available about Masada when her book was written.

=== Alignment of dates with Medjugorje ===
Damian Mac Namara, a professor of engineering, performed an analysis of the date of birth of the Virgin Mary in the Poem. Valtorta does not provide a specific date for that event, but the messages associated with Medjugorje directly state that the date was August 5, 17 BC.

Mac Namara stated that some of the details casually mentioned in Valtorta's description of the sky and environment at the time of the birth of Mary turned out to be essential to his analysis. He concluded that although Valtorta wrote her descriptions in the 1940's, the date provided by the Medjugorje messages aligned with the chronological framework that can be derived from the Poem.

=== Mathematical and statistical analysis ===
Matricciani and De Caro performed a statistical analysis of Maria Valtorta's mystical writing using mathematical and statistical tools developed for studying deep linguistic aspects of texts. They showed that the literary works attributable directly to Valtorta differ significantly from her other literary works attributable to the characters of Jesus and Mary, and mathematically appear to have been written by different authors. Comparison with the Italian literature showed that Valtorta "seems to be able to write texts so diverse to cover the entire mathematical range of the Italian literature of seven centuries."

Matricciani and De Caro also performed a deep-language mathematical analysis of the speeches attributed to Jesus Christ in Valtorta's work. In addition to their theological and doctrinal content, they state that the speeches are so realistic in whatever mathematical parameter or setting they are studied, that Valtorta "is either a great literary author, or—as she claims—an attentive 'eyewitness' of what she reports."

=== Scriptural and theological ===
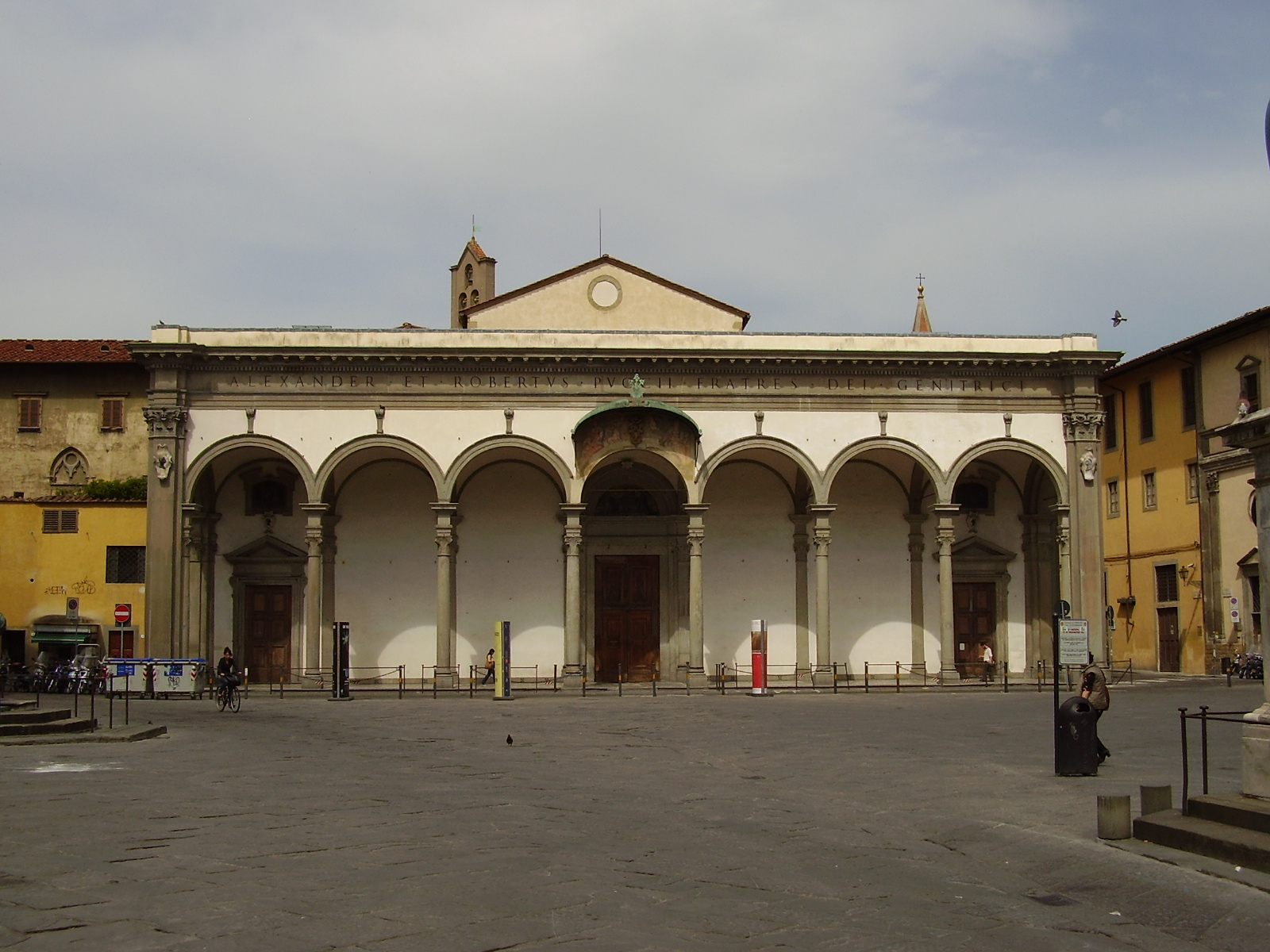
Basilica of Santissima Annunziata, Florence, the mother church of the Servite Order, where Maria Valtorta is buried.

Biblical scholar Gabriele Allegra, was a supporter of the writings of Maria Valtorta and in his letters from China and Hong Kong recommended the Poem to fellow Franciscans and his family members. Allegra wrote that in his opinion no exegetist or historian came close to describing the events of the life of Jesus as well as Maria Valtorta. Allegra wrote that it was necessary to investigate how a bed-ridden woman could write the detailed text for that work in three years.

Mariologist Gabriel Roschini (who presided over Valtorta's privileged burial) wrote that in his opinion the Mariology in Maria Valtorta's work was superior to all other Mariological writings he had ever seen. Roschini wrote that Valtorta is "one of the greatest contemporary mystics", and that her writings "constitute the most melodious hymn rising from earth to the noble Queen of Heaven".

Theologian René Laurentin et al. performed an analysis of the names of ancient people mentioned in the Poem. Some of the names in Valtorta's text are only found in her work, but others correspond to people also mentioned in the Bible, the works of Flavius Josephus, or Talmudic texts. Laurentin et al. state that their analysis indicates that the ancient names in Valtorta's text that correspond to ancient sources are consistent. As an example they refer to the names of the members of the Sanhedrin during the third decade of the first century AD. Nine of these are mentioned in the New Testament and forty others are spread among the works of Josephus and the Talmud. Laurentin et al. state that Valtorta's work treats these names and their relationships with each other consistently.

Ernesto Zucchini, a priest and theologian, wrote that as a professor of theology he had considered how to classify Valtorta as a follower of a specific school of theological thought such as Dominican, Franciscan, etc. But he realized that Valtorta was not a follower of any specific group. Zucchini stated that he had found the theology in Valtorta's work consistent and thorough.

Theologian Francesco Silletta wrote two books supporting the theological content of Valtorta's work. In one book Siletta used Valtorta's writings to shed light on the theology of the Trinity. In the other book he discussed Valtorta's work in the context of the theology of faith.

=== General support ===
Archbishop Alfonso Carinci corresponded with and visited Maria Valtorta multiple times and expressed a favorable opinion of her and her writings. The letters between Carinci and Valtorta were later published as a book. Several bishops, including Bishops Roman Danylak and Joseph Kundukulam, have issued letters of support for Valtorta's work, effectively stating that it contains nothing contrary to faith and morals.

Leo Maasburg, an Austrian priest and Mother Teresa's confessor, stated that she usually carried a copy of one of the volumes of the Poem with her and recommended the work to him. Maria Inés Teresa Arias, wrote in 1978: "I am very attached to the reading of the work The Poem of the Man-God. Truly it has become one of the most beautiful sources of spiritual reading." One of her nuns, Sister Urlanga, stated that Arias recommended and gifted the Poem to bishops, priests, and other persons.

On 12 October 2021, the 60th anniversary of Valtorta's death, the Archbishop of Lucca Paolo Giulietti who has jurisdiction over the city of Viareggio, gave a talk about the life and writings of Valtorta at a conference in Viareggio.

Ernesto Zucchini, a priest in Massa Carrara, stated that the large volume of theological and historical details discussed in Valtorta's work should be viewed in the context of her educational background, her health and the environment around her. Zucchini stated that it is surprising that Valtorta could write so much detail in a three year period when she had several health problems, and as the Second World War was tearing Tuscany apart, food was rationed, and Viareggio was being bombed. In addition, Zucchini stated that given that Maria Valtorta had never attended a university, it is hard to explain how she obtained all the knowledge included in her work.

Italian journalist Renato Bruschi wrote that in his opinion it is a mystery how Maria Valtorta could produce a work with so much information during the Second World War, given that Viareggio was directly on the Axis controlled Gothic Line which ran across Italy during the conflict. He wrote that in his view Valtorta's Poem may be considered some type of historical miracle, given the war situation in Tuscany when it was being written.

Writing in Aleteia, Italian journalist Gelsomino Del Guercio stated that the circumstances under which Maria Valtorta wrote the Poem were exceptional, given her health problems and the serious war time difficulties in Italy during the Italian campaign taking place in Tuscany. He wrote that her ability to produce her detailed work under these conditions made her a unique case.

Antonio Socci, an Italian journalist and author writing for the newspaper Libero, wrote an article about how in his experience Valtorta's main work is "a book that can change a life". He stated that he approached the work many years ago with a certain skepticism, but was surprised that the work seemed to be the writing of a very rational, concrete woman, very detailed in her descriptions and not at all inclined to sentimentality and fantasies.

=== Spiritual value ===
When reviewing the development of the Catholic Church in Tuscany, Antonio Socci wrote that he agreed with the statement by the priest and theologian Cornelio Fabro that Valtorta's work has exceptional and unique spiritual value. Fabro stated that he had found deep joy in reading Valtorta's Poem, given the spiritual light it shines on all virtues. Socci stated that no one had been able to give him an explanation of how a bed-ridden person could write such a long book with so much detail and spiritual content in three years.

Italian priest Pietro Cantoni wrote that for many years the ten volumes of Valtorta's book have surrounded his life. He stated that initially he had avoided reading the Poem due to his intellectual arrogance in assuming he would not learn much from it. But after reading it, he came to consider it as having some type of miraculous transformative effect that can improve a person in a spiritual sense.

== Criticism ==
The earliest published criticism of the Poem was a January 1960 article in L'Osservatore Romano which called the work a badly fictionalized life of Jesus. Between 1985 and 1993, Cardinal Joseph Ratzinger wrote two letters referencing the L'Osservatore Romano article and stated that the work cannot be considered supernatural in origin. In 1992 Archbishop Dionigi Tettamanzi wrote a letter suggesting that the material in the work are literary forms to narrate the life of Jesus, and cannot be considered of supernatural origin.

In 2023 historian Joachim Bouflet wrote a book with a chapter that listed various criticisms of Valtorta's work. He addressed the issue of the two references to screwdrivers in Valtorta's work. He stated that the use of the term screwdriver by Valtorta has been one of the frequently discussed issues because screwdrivers are not known to have existed during the first century AD. Bouflet also stated that Valtorta supporters do not consider this an anachronism because in one case Valtorta wrote "it looks like a screw driver" and in another case they were small items, admitting that both references may have been to wood chisels that resembled screwdrivers.

Bouflet addressed Valtorta's statement in chapter 8 of her work that around the cube-like structure of the inner sanctuary at the Second Temple several cupolas that resembled huge half oranges could be seen. Bouflet stated that in his opinion the excavations by Nahman Avigad and Yigael Shiloh in the 1980s coupled with his reading of Flavius Josephus indicate that the Second Temple had no such cupolas around the inner sanctuary.

Bouflet states that Valtorta talks about the existence of Tiberias in her vision when Jesus Christ was 5 years old and staying in Egypt, when the city was not yet founded. However, Valtorta does not provide any descriptions of Tiberias, but only interprets the places pointed out by the child Jesus around a small broken pot filled with water representing the Sea of Galilee, as locations that she recognizes. Additionally, this episode of Valtorta's work takes place in Galilee and not in Egypt, as Bouflet had mistakenly assumed.

Bouflet maintains that the descriptions of the Opuntia ficus-indica (prickly pear or Indian fig) provided by Valtorta did not match any plant that existed in first-century Palestine, and this plant only grew in Mexico and the Americas. However, Bouflet acknowledged that the botanist Pietro Andrea Mattioli believed that the prickly pear grew in Europe before the discovery of America.

Bouflet states that the use of the word "vanilla" by a first-century AD person in chapter 168 of the work, is linguistically anachronistic since the term was only coined in the 16th century. However, Bouflet acknowledged that in 2018 a chemical analysis of 3600-year-old wine jars excavated in Judea suggested that vanilla existed in Palestine prior to the first-century AD.

Sandra Miesel, writing in The Catholic World Report, stated that in her opinion as a layperson and not a theologian, the Poem has a fundamental Catholic doctrinal flaw in that it assumes the gospel accounts are not complete and need extension. However, Italian journalist and author Antonio Socci states that it should not be surprising that Valtorta's work expands the four gospel accounts given that the Gospel of John 21:25 directly states that Jesus did many things in his life that are not recorded in the gospels. Furthermore, Miesel's article contains several verifiable errors concerning the work and the Church's relationship to the work, which brings the article's reliability into question.

In February 2025 the Dicastery for the Doctrine of the Faith issued a press release stating that the writings of Valtorta cannot be considered of supernatural origin, but must be considered literary forms to narrate the life of Jesus Christ. Ernesto Zucchini, a priest and theologian, wrote that in his view this February 2025 statement will have the same fate as the rejection of the works of Galileo Galilei, Antonio Rosmini, and Faustina Kowalska and will be reversed. All three authors were on the Index, but Rosmini was later beatified and Kowalska was declared a saint.

== Popular culture ==
Italian film maker Andrea Carabelli made a film about the betrayal of Jesus by Judas Iscariot based on the narrative of Maria Valtorta's work. The film was called "Io sono Giudas" (I am Judas) and was screened in theaters around Italy 2021–2023.

Maria Valtorta's Poem was one of the three topics covered by the film "Miracles : La science face à l'inexplicable" (Miracles: Science faces the unexplainable) made by the French film maker Pierre Barnerias. It was shown in cinemas around France in 2023.

Armando Pierucci, a Franciscan friar and musician, told Il Resto Del Carlino that he composed 4 musical pieces for the saxophone and organ based on 4 episodes in Valtorta's work. He said someone had gifted him the book in the 1970s and it had become the "guidebook to his life" for 50 years. The music was to be performed on October 4, 2024 at the San Giovanni Battista church in Pesaro.

== See also ==
- Beatific vision
- Marian apparition
- Private revelation
