= Alfonso Carinci =

Italian Roman Catholic Archbishop

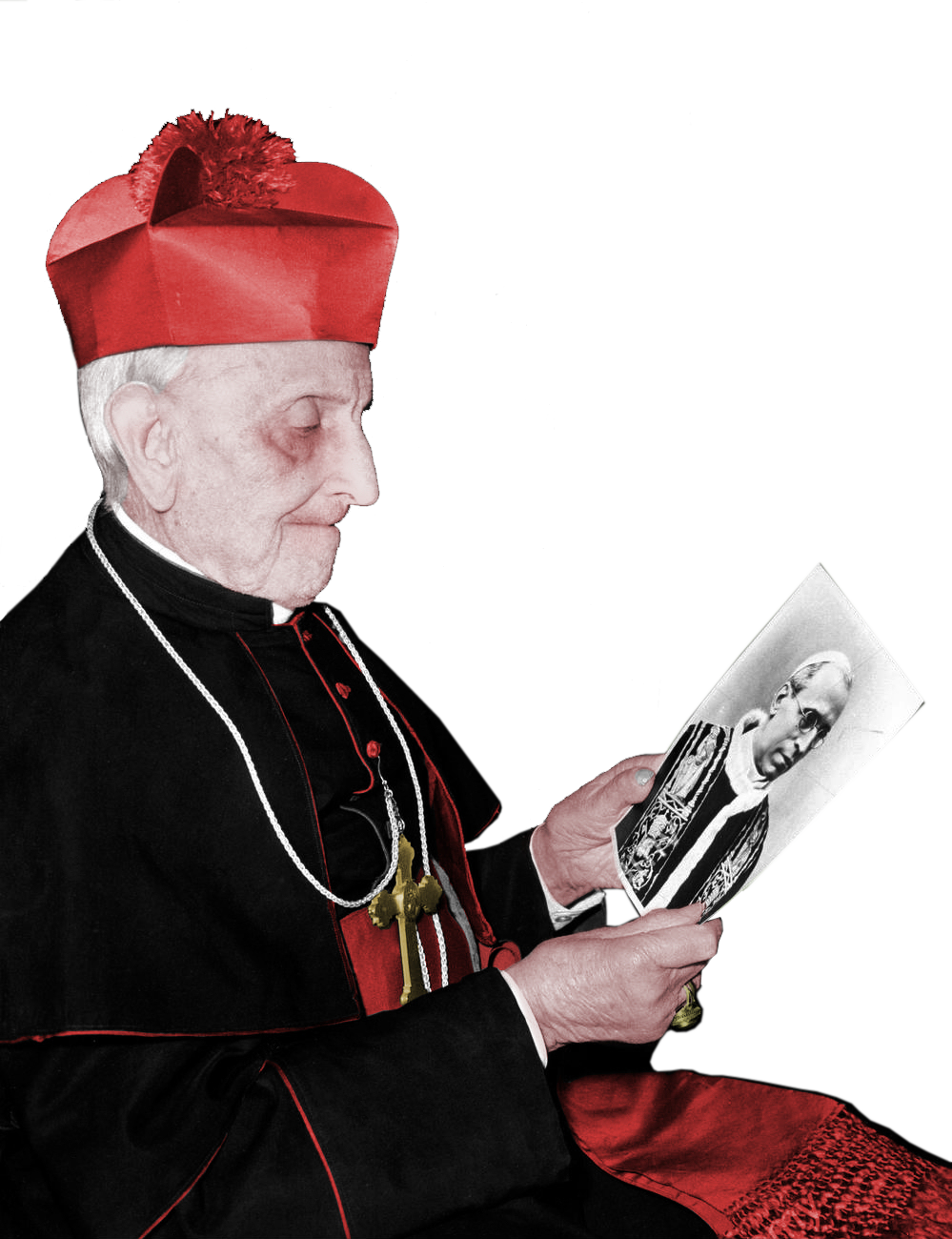

Alphonso Carinci (November 9, 1862 – December 6, 1963) was a Roman Catholic Archbishop. He was the secretary of the Sacred Congregation of Rites. He also served as titular Archbishop of Selucia, in Isauria, from 1945 until his death at the age of 101.

Carinci, who had been at the First Vatican Council as a choir boy was the oldest bishop at the first session of the Second Vatican Council (the 21st Ecumenical Council) held in Rome from October to December 1962.

== Sources ==
- Catholic Hierarchy
