= Maria Valtorta =

Italian Catholic writer and mystic

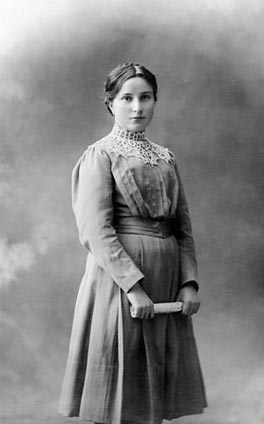
- Valtorta at age 15, 1912
- Born: 14 March 1897; Caserta, Kingdom of Italy
- Died: 12 October 1961 (aged 64); Viareggio, Italy
- Resting place: Basilica of Santissima Annunziata, Florence
- Writing career
- Genres: Christian mysticism, visions
- Notable works: The Poem of the Man-God; The Book of Azariah

Maria Valtorta (14 March 1897 – 12 October 1961) was an Italian Catholic writer and mystic. A Franciscan tertiary and a lay member of the Servants of Mary, she reported that she had personal conversations with, and dictations from, Jesus Christ. She lived much of her life bedridden in Viareggio in Tuscany.

She is best known for her 5,000 page book The Poem of the Man-God, first published in 1956 and later titled The Gospel as Revealed to Me. The book was mostly written from 1944 to 1947 and was later translated into many languages. The book was placed on the Index Librorum Prohibitorum in 1959. In 2025, the Dicastery for the Doctrine of the Faith stated that her writings do not have a supernatural origin.

Various Biblical experts, historians, and scientists continue to support and criticize the book to this day. Her work has been compared to the writings of other Catholic authors claiming visions and yearly conferences have been held in Italy regarding her works.

== Life ==
=== Early life and education ===
Valtorta was born in 1897 in Caserta, just north of Naples, in the Campania region of Italy, where her father's military regiment was stationed. She was the only child of parents who had both been born in the Lombardy region. Her father, Giuseppe, was in the Italian cavalry; her mother, Iside, was a teacher of French. In 1898 the family moved with his father's regiment to Faenza in Emilia-Romagna.

In 1900 her father's regiment moved to Milan, and the Valtorta family lived in Lombardy until his retirement about 12 years later. In 1907 the regiment moved to Voghera where Maria attended school and where the park "Gardens of Maria Valtorta" was inaugurated in her name in 2013.

In March 1909, just before her 12th birthday, Maria was sent to the Collegio Bianconi boarding school in Monza, just north of Milan. She studied there until March 1913 when just before her 16th birthday she had to leave Lombardy with her family for Florence, in Tuscany, due to her father's retirement from the military.

=== A decade in Florence ===
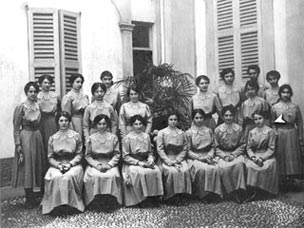
Maria and her classmates at the Collegio Bianconi, Monza, soon before she moved to Florence

The First World War (1914–1918) started about a year after the Valtorta family had settled in Florence, and Italy entered the war in April 1915 on the side of the allies. In 1917 Valtorta volunteered as a Samaritan nurse, and for 18 months worked at a military hospital set up in Florence to care for the wounded soldiers who had returned from the war.

In March 1920, when she was 23 years old, Maria was walking on a street in Florence with her mother, when the young and delinquent son of her mother's dress maker (who was a fascist) struck her in the back with an iron bar and shouted a slogan against the wealthy and the bourgeoisie.

As a result of that injury, she was confined to bed for a few months and although she seemed to have recovered, the complications from that incident eventually confined her to bed for 28 years, from April 1934 to the end of her life.

=== Settling in Viareggio ===
In October 1924, when Maria was 27 years old, the Valtorta family moved from Florence to Viareggio, on the coast of the Mediterranean, as part of her father's final retirement. Over time, Maria's back injury affected her health in a progressive manner, and the last day she was able to leave her house on her own, given her high level of fatigue, was 4 January 1933. From 1 April 1934 she was no longer able to leave her bed at all.

In 1935, a year after she was bed-ridden, Martha Diciotti began to care for her. Valtorta's father died in 1935 and her mother in 1943, after which she was mostly alone in the house, with Martha Diciotti taking care of her to the end of her life. After 1941, except for a brief wartime evacuation to Sant'Andrea di Compito in Lucca, from April to December 1944, during the Second World War, Valtorta's life was spent in her bed at her house in Via Antonio Fratti in Viareggio.

In 1942, Valtorta was visited by Romualdo Migliorini, then a priest of the Servants of Mary and later a bishop. He became her spiritual director and suggested she write her autobiography, which she completed in 1943.

In her autobiography Valtorta wrote that both in Florence and Viareggio, she had deep religious experiences which transformed her life. In 1925, soon after moving to Viareggio, she was influenced by the autobiography of Thérèse de Lisieux, and made a vow to offer herself to God as a victim soul and to renew that offer each day.

=== From handwriting to publication ===
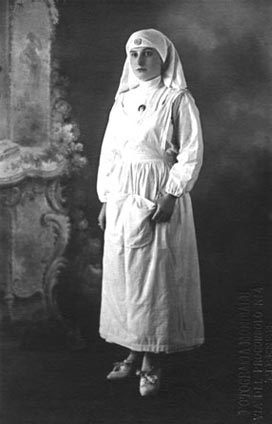
In 1918, at age 21, in the uniform of a Samaritan nurse, during the First World War

After completing her autobiography, in 1943 Valtorta began handwriting a series of what she claimed were messages from Jesus. From 1943 to 1947 Valtorta hand wrote about 15,000 pages in her notebooks, 10,000 of which were later selected as the basis of her main book The Poem of the Man-God, and the rest were gradually organized and published after her death.

Valtorta wrote her text in a series of 122 school notebooks purchased for her by her priest. She used a fountain pen to write in her numbered notebooks, but did not write the episodes for her Poem in chronological order, and instead included markings as to how they should be ordered after the book had been completed.

Valtorta was initially reluctant to have any of her handwritten notes published but in 1947 her spiritual director convinced her to agree to their publication. Nonetheless, the first four-volume edition of the book was published anonymously.

In February 1948, the priests Miglorini, Corrado Berti, and their prior Chechin had a private audience with Pope Pius XII about her work, which was reported on in the L'Osservatore Romano. Although Pius XII had expressed admiration for the book, in 1949 the Holy Office summoned Berti and ordered him not to publish it.

In 1952 Michele Pisani agreed to publish Valtorta's work and a contract was signed by Valtorta in October 1952. The first edition of her Poem was published in 1956 and the Pisani form has since continued to publish the rest of her writings,

Joachim Bouflet states that most of Maria Valtorta's life is known "only by the autobiography she wrote when she was 46 years old". However, at least two biographies of Valtorta based on taped interviews with people who personally knew her have been published, one titled Ricordi di Donne Che Conobbero Maria Valtorta, (Memories of Women Who Knew Maria Valtorta) and another titled Una Vita con Maria Valtorta: Testimonianze di Marta Diciotti (A Life with Maria Valtorta: Testimony of Marta Diciotti).

=== Death ===
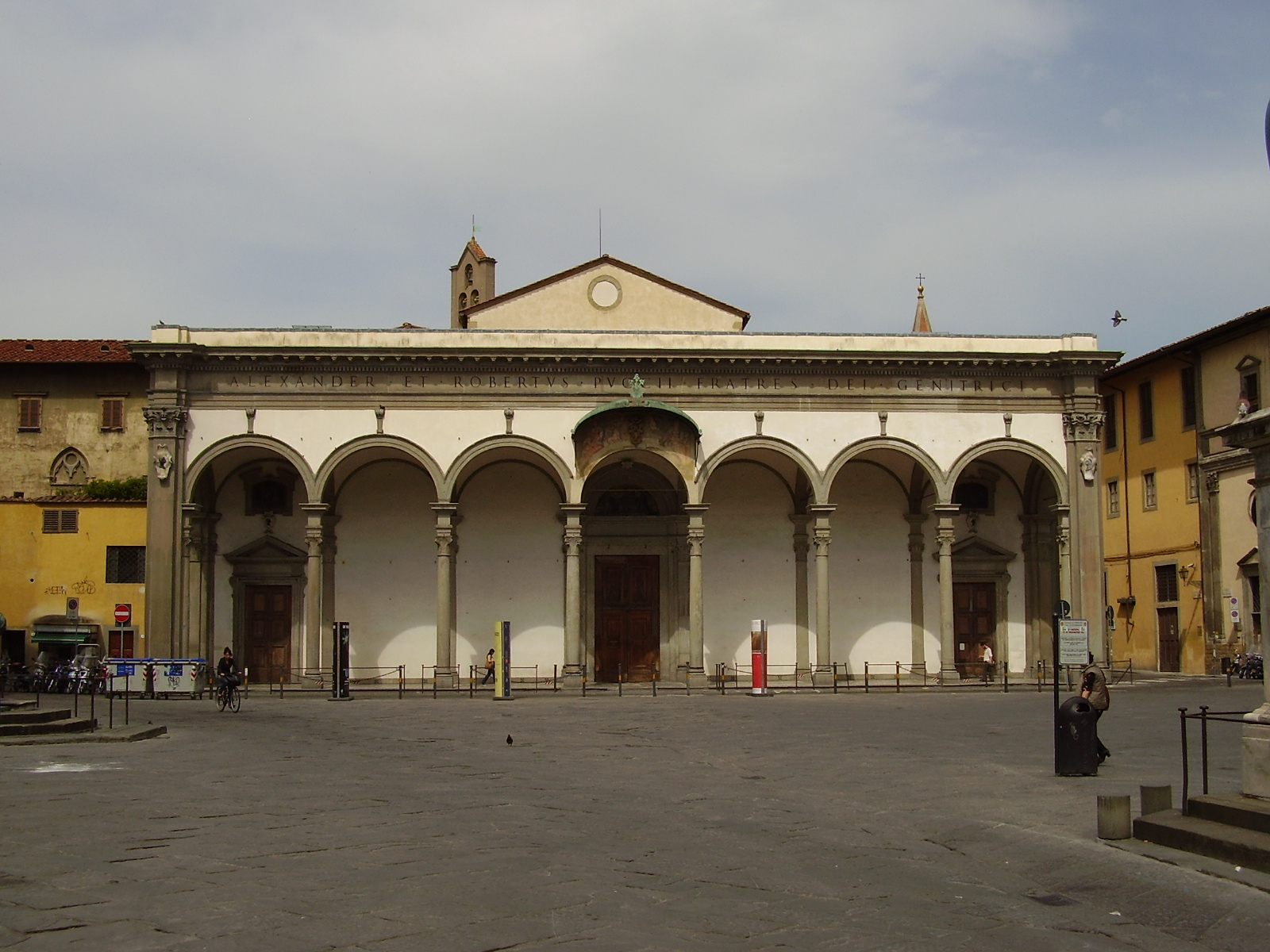
Basilica of Santissima Annunziata, Florence, the mother church of the Servite Order, where Maria Valtorta is buried.

Maria Valtorta died in 1961, at age 64, and was buried in the town cemetery in Viareggio. Later, in 1973, her remains were moved to the chapel of the great cloister of the Basilica della Santissima Annunziata in Florence. Presiding over the services at Valtorta's "privileged burial" and the relocation of her remains from Viareggio to the Santissima Annunziata Basilica, the mother church of the Servants of Mary, was Gabriel M. Roschini, who had written a book about her.

== Writings ==
=== The Poem of the Man-God ===
Valtorta's best known book is The Poem of the Man God. Valtorta signed a contract with Michele Pisani in 1952 to publish the book, and the first of the four volumes was published without an author name under the Italian title Il Poema di Gesu (The Poem of Jesus). The other three volumes were also published without an author name, but had a different Italian title: Il Poema dell'Uomo-Dio (The Poem of the Man-God).

=== Other books ===
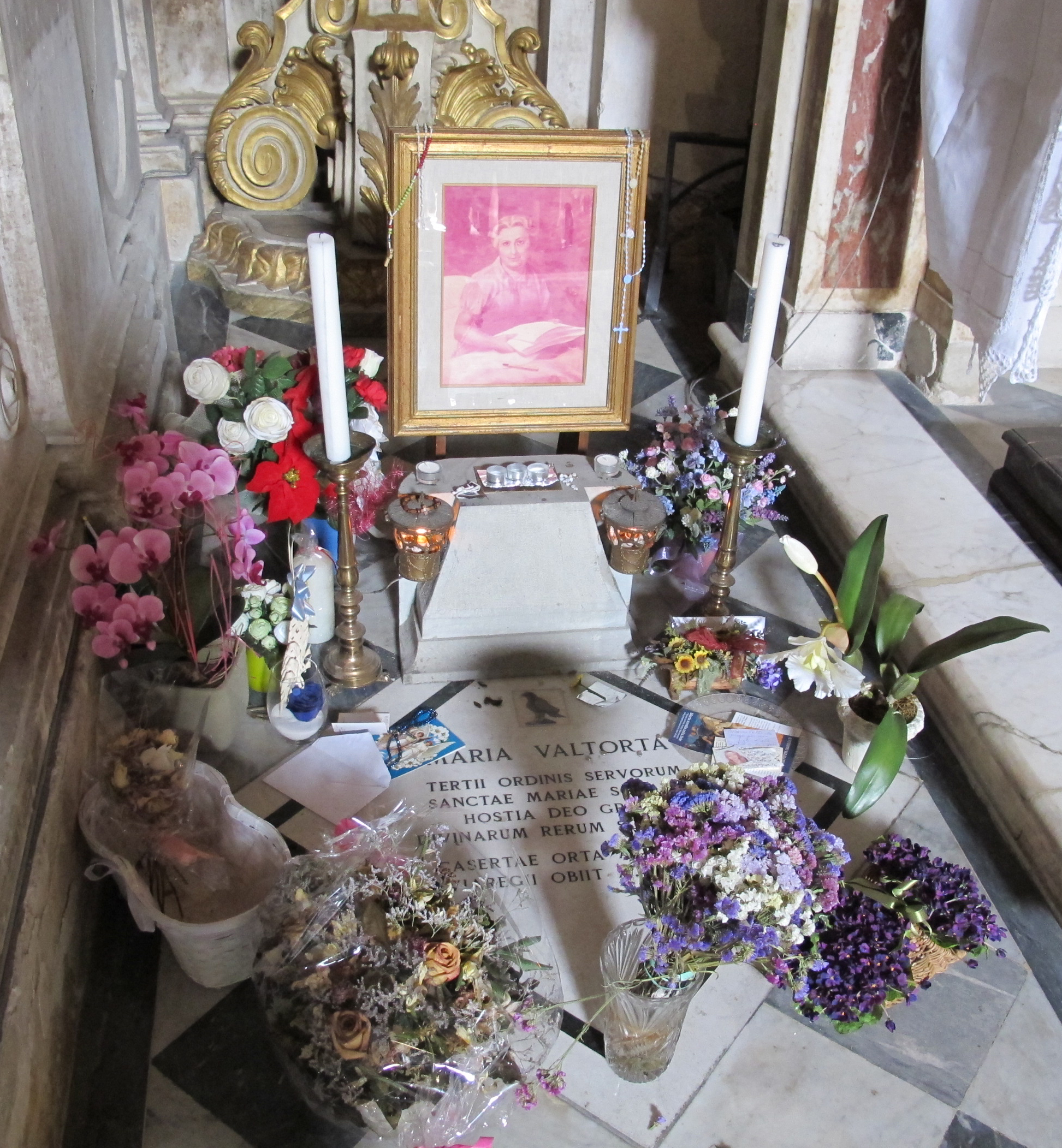
Tomb of Valtorta at the Basilica of Santissima Annunziata in Florence

After Valtorta's death in 1961, several books based on material contained in her handwritten notebooks were gradually published. Her autobiography, which she had completed in 1943, was published in 1969. In 1972, her Book of Azariah was published, based on material she had written every Sunday from the end of February 1946 to the beginning of February 1947. The book contains spiritual lessons about the Catholic Masses said on those Sundays. Valtorta wrote that the lessons were given to her by Azariah, her guardian angel.

In 1976 the first of the four volumes of her "Notebooks" were published. These were based on material interspersed with the text for her Poem within the 122 school notebooks which she had used to write her text. In 1977 the book Lessons on the Epistle of Paul to the Romans was published in Italian, containing comments on Paul's Letter to the Romans. In 2006 additional unpublished pages from her handwritten notebooks were gathered and published in Italian as the Small Notebooks. Valtorta's books were translated into other languages beside Italian.

== Legacy ==
Before her death in 1961, Valtorta assigned her assistant Marta Diciotti as the heir to her writings, and in 2001 Marta Diciotti in turn assigned Emilio and Claudia Pisani as her heirs. The Pisanis then formed a foundation dedicated to the works of Maria Valtorta. Since Valtorta's death the Pisani organization has been publishing books based on Valtorta's handwritten notebooks and her Poem has been translated into over 20 languages. Yearly conferences on the scientific and theological aspects of her writings are held in Italy.

Separately, the Maria Valtorta Foundation was formed in 2009 in Viareggio by Ernesto Zucchini, a priest and professor of theology, and has been holding yearly conferences on the writings of Valtorta in Viareggio, and presentations about her at various locations in Italy. The conference on 12 October 2021 (the 60th anniversary of Valtorta's death) was attended by Paolo Giulietti, the Archbishop of Lucca, who has jurisdiction over the city of Viareggio, and he gave a talk about the life and writings of Valtorta.

Over the years, authors such as Daniel Klimek and Rene Laurentin have discussed Valtorta's work along with those of Maria Agreda and Anne Catherine Emmerich. Klimek, a Franciscan priest and theologian, states that although all three authors have claimed visions, their writings conflict at various points. He adds that Valtorta's work has been impressive due to the knowledge it contains regarding obscure geographic locations identified after her death. Laurentin performed specific comparisons of the works of the three authors and noted similarities, but also differences.

== Support and criticism ==
Valtorta's work became controversial, soon after its publication, given that a January 1960 article in L'Osservatore Romano called the book a badly fictionalized life of Jesus. The same issue of L'Osservatore announced the placement of the book on the Index of Forbidden Books. A notice in the December 1, 1961 issue of L'Osservatore stated that the placement on the Index was due to the lack of an imprimatur. On 15 June 1966, the Sacred Congregation for the Doctrine of the Faith abolished the Index, and all formal sanctions against reading books placed on the Index ended. In 2025, the same office declared Valtorta's writings as non-supernatural in origin.

Valtorta's work has continued to remain controversial and various Biblical experts, historians and scientists support and criticize it to this day, and yearly conferences on the scientific and theological aspects of her writings are held in Italy. Scientists Emilio Matricciani and Liberato De Caro support her work based on astronomical and mathematical analysis. Gianfranco Battisti, a professor of geography, supports the book based on its about 500 geographic and topographic descriptions. Biblical scholara such as Gabriele Allegra, Gabriel Roschini and René Laurentin support the book based on its theological contents and scriptural analysis. Authors such as Fernando La Greca have argued that Valtorta's work contains historical and geographical details that were discovered and written about after she had died in 1961. Marco Corvaglia has argued that in some cases descriptions in Valtorta's work are similar to earlier works.

Cardinal Joseph Ratzinger and Archbishop Dionigi Tettamanzi wrote letters stating that the material in the book is literary and has no supernatural origin. Historian Joachim Bouflet has criticized the book based on his historical analysis. Author Sandra Miesel criticized the book on general grounds. The Dicastry of the Doctrine of Faith made an official statement saying that Valtorta's writings are purely literary texts of a personal nature.

== Works ==
- The Poem of the Man-God, ASIN B001DBLAVS,
- The Gospel as Revealed to Me, ASIN B01E6291GQ
- The Book of Azariah, ASIN 8879870130
- The End Times, ASIN 2894202210
- Mary Magdalene, ASIN 8879871323
- Lessons on the Epistle of St. Paul to the Romans, ASIN B091NDKRTQ
- Valtorta and Ferri, ASIN 887987134X
- The Notebooks 1943, ASIN 8879870327
- The Notebooks 1944, ASIN 8879870424
- The Notebooks 1945–1950, ASIN 8879870882
- The Little Notebooks
- Autobiography, ASIN B000BY4XKS

== See also ==
- Alexandrina of Balazar
- Marthe Robin
