= Interior locution =

Mystical concept in various religions

An interior locution is a mystical concept used by various religions. An interior locution is a form of private revelation, but is distinct from an apparition, or religious vision. An interior locution may be defined as "A supernatural communication to the ear, imagination, or directly to the intellect."

== Etymology ==
From the Latin locutio, speaking, speech, or discourse; and from loqui, to speak.

== Description ==
"Supernatural words are manifestations of God's thought which are heard either by the exterior senses or by the interior senses or immediately by the intellect." An example of the first is Gabriel's appearance to Zachary described in Luke 1:10-20. The latter two more properly fall under interior locutions. According to John of the Cross, "[t]hese are usually produced in a person's spirit without the use of the bodily senses as means ... Formal locutions are certain distinct and formal words that the spirit receives, whether or not recollected, not from itself but from another." According to William Meninger OCSO, the fifth vision of Julian of Norwich came in the form of an interior locution which she heard "clearly in her heart though not a word is spoken."

Another way to describe locutions is as corporeal, imaginary, or spiritual or intellectual.

Corporeal locutions are those actually heard by the physical powers of hearing ... Imaginary locutions are not heard in that way but the impression apprehended and received by the imaginative faculty is the same as though it had been ... In spiritual or intellectual locutions God imprints what he is about to say in the depths of the spirit: there is no sound or voice, or either corporeal or imaginative representation of such, but an expression of (certain) concepts in the depths of the spirit and in the faculty of understanding...

It was an interior locution that reportedly led Gabriel of Our Lady of Sorrows to enter religious life. After a cholera epidemic that killed his sister had ended, Spoleto clergy and civic authorities organised a procession of the ancient icon of the Virgin Mary in Spoleto’s cathedral. Francis attended the procession and as the image passed by him, he felt an interior voice asking why he remained in the world. This event was the galvanising force behind the first serious steps in Francis’ religious vocation.

It is not always easy to determine whether the purported communication is actually from another source or the product of the person's own mind. An interior locution is distinguished from an interior monologue. Teresa of Ávila addresses this in El Castillo Interior (The Interior Castle), written in 1577. Spurious locutions can be recognized by their lack of coherence or clarity, and the disquiet they cause in the one who receives them.

Reginald Garrigou-Lagrange explains: "Even in revelations approved as probable by the Church, some error may slip in; for the saints themselves may attribute to the Holy Ghost what proceeds from themselves, or may falsely interpret the meaning of a divine revelation, or interpret it in too materialistic a manner, as, for example, the disciples interpreted Christ's remark about St. John to mean that the latter would not die." (John 21:23) John of the Cross makes the same point in Ascent of Mount Carmel, Book 2, Chapter 19. While God's locutions are true and certain in themselves, "our manner of understanding them is defective.

== Sources ==
- Michael Freze, 1993, Voices, Visions, and Apparitions, OSV Publishing ISBN 0-87973-454-X
