= Blue Army of Our Lady of Fátima =

International Catholic association

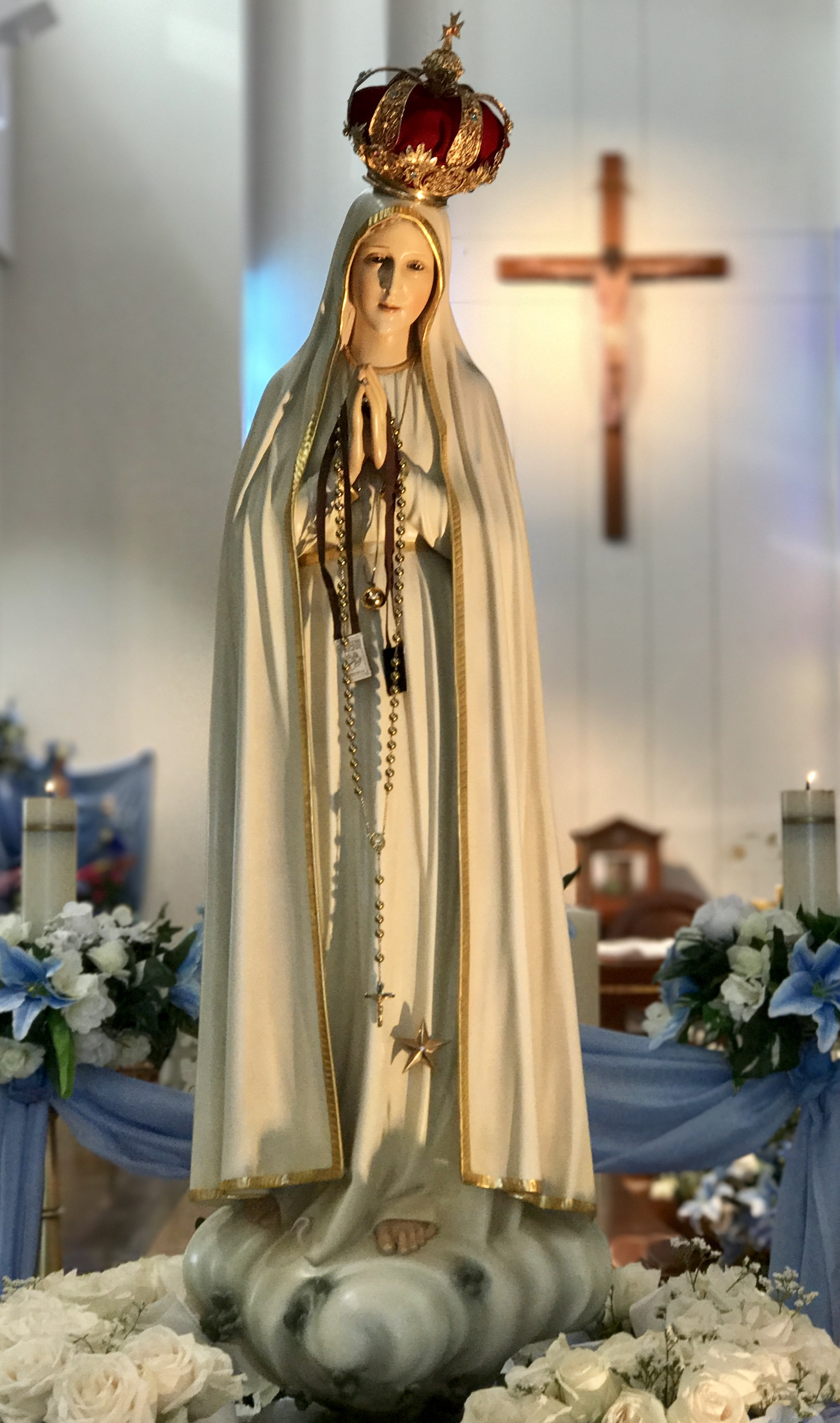
The pilgrim image of Our Lady of Fátima devoted by the Blue Army

The Blue Army of Our Lady of Fátima, now mostly known as the World Apostolate of Fátima, is a public international association that has as its general purpose "the promotion of the authentic teaching of the Catholic Church and the strict adherence to the tenets of the Gospel; the personal sanctification of adherents through faithful adherence to the Message of Our Lady of Fátima and the promotion of the common good by the spreading of that Message of Fátima".

== History ==
=== Blue Army of Our Lady of Fátima ===
The Blue Army was founded in 1946 by Harold V. Colgan, parish priest of St. Mary of Plainfield, New Jersey (US). Father Colgan had fallen seriously ill and was hospitalized. During his illness he prayed to Our Lady of Fátima that if she should cure him he would spend the rest of his life spreading devotion to her. He attributed his recovery to his prayers, and began preaching to his congregation on a regular basis about the Virgin Mary.

He summed up the message of Our Lady's apparition as this:

- Devotion to the Immaculate Heart of Mary,
- Daily recitation of the Rosary and
- Righteous observance of the duties of one's state of life.

His message was highly successful; however, he wanted to make more of a lasting impression upon his congregation, and so he added two further items of his own invention. The first was a signed promise that one would try to uphold these values and the second was to wear a blue ribbon or blue medal in order to remember the promise. This was also a success and the congregation all enrolled. It was then that Fr. Colgan began to think about extending this to other parishes and other nations. Thus was born the Blue Army, from Colgan's own words: "We will be the Blue army of Mary and Christ, against the red of the world and of Satan."

Fr. Colgan began preaching his message and gained success, especially with the assistance of writer John Haffert who began delivering conferences on the message of Fátima and the Blue Army. Colgan then went to the Vatican in May 1947 to meet Pius XII in order to present his project for approval from the pontiff. The foundation of the International Blue Army took place at the House of Pontevedra, Spain, where Mary is said to have appeared to request Communion of Reparation every First Saturday. Currently, there are over 20 million members.

=== World Apostolate of Fátima ===
While the Blue Army was founded in 1947, because of its rapid spread around the world, it became necessary to erect a new society. The Decree of Erection recognising the World Apostolate of Fátima was signed on 7 October 2005, on the Feast of the Holy Rosary. Then on 3 February 2006, the World Apostolate of Fátima held an official ceremony for the consignment of the decree and the approval of its statutes at the Pontifical Council for the Laity in Rome.

== Organization ==
The World Apostolate of Fátima has its world headquarters in the Domus Pacis ("House of Peace"), a pilgrim guest house in Fátima, Portugal. The Apostolate is broken up into prayer cells which are found in parishes throughout the world. These cells fall under state and national Apostolate centers which in turn are subordinate to the International Secretariat based at Fátima in the Domus Pacis. The International Secretariat exists in order to coordinate the activities of the organization throughout the world and to carry out the policy decisions of the board of trustees, an elected group of nine members of the Apostolate who represent various regional centers of the Apostolate. They meet once a year to discuss the internal affairs of the Apostolate.

As of 2017, Donal Anthony Foley was the secretary, World Apostolate of Fátima, England and Wales.

== Membership ==
Membership in its most basic sense is through making a Pledge promising the following:

- To offer up every day the sacrifices demanded by one's daily duty to the faithful observance of God's law
- To say five decades of the Rosary daily while meditating on the mysteries
- To wear the brown scapular of Our Lady of Mount Carmel as a sign and reminder of personal consecration to Our Lady and
- On the first Saturday of five consecutive months, with the intention of making reparation to the Immaculate Heart of Mary, confess and receive Holy Communion, recite five decades of the Rosary, and keep company with Our Lady for fifteen minutes while meditating on the mysteries of the Rosary.

The official pledge of membership is:

I pledge myself to Our Lady and wish, thereby, to join the World Apostolate of Fátima.

Dear Queen and Mother, who promised at Fátima to convert Russia and bring peace to all mankind, in reparation for my sins and the sins of the whole world, I solemnly promise to Your Immaculate Heart:

1. To offer up every day the sacrifices demanded by my daily duty
2. To pray at least five decades of the Rosary daily while meditating on the Mysteries
3. To wear the Scapular of Mount Carmel as profession of this promise and as an act of consecration to You,
4. To accomplish the devotion of the Five First Saturdays of the month, including the fifteen-minute meditation on the Mysteries of the Rosary.

I shall renew this promise often, especially in moments of temptation.

The daily offering mentioned is traditionally the following:

O my God in union with the Immaculate Heart of Mary (here kiss the brown scapular). I offer Thee the Precious Blood of Jesus from all the altars throughout the world, joining with it the offering of my every thought, word and action of this day.

O my Jesus, I desire today to gain every indulgence and merit I can and I offer them, together with myself, to Mary Immaculate – that She may best apply them to the interests of Thy Most Sacred Heart. Precious Blood of Jesus, save us! Immaculate Heart of Mary, pray for us! Sacred Heart of Jesus, have mercy on us!

Thus are delineated the primary devotions of the World Apostolate. These are the devotions mandated by the Blessed Virgin Mary during the Apparitions at Fátima. Traditionally this pledge is printed, and signed by the person who desires membership. It is also traditional that this signed pledge is then sent to the international headquarters in Fátima where it is then taken and buried near the shrine there.

Aside from the daily offering, recitation of the rosary, the wearing of the Brown Scapular of Our Lady of Mount Carmel and the five Saturdays in honor of the Immaculate Heart of Mary, the Apostolate also recommends to its members the practices of nine first Fridays in honor of the Sacred Heart of Jesus, Home Enthronement of the Sacred Heart, and family consecration to the Sacred Heart of Jesus and the Immaculate Heart of Mary.

A further practice associated with the World Apostolate is the Pilgrim statue of Our Lady of Fátima. There are several designated "pilgrim statues"; however, the primary one is the international pilgrim statue which has traversed the globe several times since its sculpting in 1947 by José Ferreira Thedim. There are two pilgrim virgin statues in the custody of the apostolate's England and Wales division, the national pilgrim virgin statue of Our Lady of Fatima for England, and the Centenary Pilgrim Virgin Statue of the Immaculate Heart of Mary, blessed at the Chapel of the Apparitions in Fatima in June 2018. The purpose of the statues is to renew interest in Catholic parishes in the message of Fátima, and to stir up affection for Mary.

== Blue Army Shrine ==
The National Blue Army Shrine of Our Lady of Fátima, in Washington Township (Warren County), New Jersey, is located on 150 acres (0.61 km^{2}) and rises over the Muscontecong Valley. It hosts more than 50,000 pilgrims annually.

== The Apostolate symbol ==
The symbol of the apostolate consists of a pair of doves forming an image of praying hands holding a rosary. These are then surrounded by an image of a brown scapular, containing the words in Latin Orbis Unus Orans ("One World Praying"), the motto of the Apostolate. All of these surmounted on a blue disc, blue being the symbolic liturgical color of the Virgin Mary in the Catholic Church.

== Media ==
In 1996, John Haffert (co-founder of the Blue Army of Our Lady of Fátima) spoke about Fátima and his book Meet the Witnesses, in which he interviewed nearly 200 witnesses to the Fátima miracle, describing their detailed witness accounts.

In 1985, the organization largely financed the film State of Emergency, originally advertised under the title Chain Reaction. Starring Martin Sheen, the film concerns a nuclear physicist who determines that nuclear fusion experiments may lead to global destruction. The physicist travels to Portugal to investigate the Fátima prophecies, believing they may describe his fears. The film was produced by Richard Bennett and written by Ray Cunneff, based on an article on nuclear tests by Rand McNally Jr. Of the production, Martin Sheen said, "The fact that it's even being done is so extraordinary. A film about a man's subtle transformation, about a spiritual journey he's compelled to take…amazing! It's hard to find anything where you can project your personal feelings." The film's budget was $6 million. It also starred Peter Firth and Tim Pigott-Smith.

The World Apostolate of Fátima USA has published Soul Magazine quarterly since 1950. The editor is Barb Ernster.

== See also ==
- Our Lady of Fátima
- Sanctuary of Fátima
- Sol de Fátima (magazine)
- First Saturdays Devotion
- Legion of Mary
