= Co-Redemptrix =

Title for the Blessed Virgin Mary

Co-Redemptrix (also spelled Coredemptrix; Co-Redemptress is an equivalent term) is a title used by some Catholics for the Virgin Mary, emphasizing her unique, subordinate cooperation with Jesus Christ in the redemption of humanity.

According to those who use the term, Co-Redemptrix refers to a subordinate but essential participation by the Blessed Virgin Mary in redemption, notably that she gave free consent to give life to the Redeemer, which meant sharing his life, suffering, and death, which were redemptive for the world. Related to this belief is the concept of Mary as Mediatrix, which is a separate concept but regularly included by Catholics who use the title Co-Redemptrix. Some, in particular the adherents of the Marian apparitions of The Lady of All Nations, have petitioned for a dogmatic definition, along with Mediatrix and Advocate.

The term "Co-redemptrix" has been applied to the Virgin Mary since the 15th century. Bernard of Clairvaux assigned Mary a role at the foot of the Cross that gave rise to the title "Co-redemptrix", which first appears in an anonymous fifteenth-century hymn from Salzburg: "Loving, sweet, and kind / altogether undeserving of any sorrow / if you henceforth chose to weep / as one suffering with the Redeemer / for the captive sinner / you would be co-redemptrix."

In more recent times, the title has received some support from the Catholic Magisterium though it is not included in the concluding chapter of the apostolic constitution Lumen gentium of the Second Vatican Council, which chapter many theologians hold to be a comprehensive summary of Catholic Mariology.

On 4 November 2025, the Dicastery for the Doctrine of the Faith released Mater populi fidelis, a doctrinal note on Marian titles and Mary's role in salvation. Signed by Cardinal Víctor Manuel Fernández and Monsignor Armando Matteo, it clarified that it is always inappropriate to use the title "Co-redemptrix" to define Mary's cooperation, as this title risks obscuring Christ's unique salvific mediation and can therefore create confusion. The document was approved by Pope Leo XIV on 7 October 2025.

In December 2025, the Theological Commission of the International Marian Association, composed of 40 bishops and theologians, published a strongly critical response to the document Mater Populi Fidelis.

== Doctrine and context ==
The prefix "co-" derives from the Latin term "cum", which means "with" (and not "equal to"). Mary cooperates in a unique and subordinate way with Christ (the only Redeemer) in the redemption of the human race, through her fiat at the Annunciation and the subsequent incarnation of Christ, and by accompanying Jesus to Calvary where she suffered spiritually with Him.

Proponents view the title Co-Redemptrix as not implying that Mary participates as equal part in the redemption of the human race, since Christ is the only redeemer. Mary herself needed redemption and was redeemed by Jesus Christ. Being redeemed by Christ, implies that she cannot be his equal part in the redemption process. Similarly, if Mary is described as the mediatrix of all graces, it “is to be so understood that it neither takes away from nor adds anything to the dignity and efficaciousness of Christ the one Mediator”.

The words of Luke 1, 38: "Behold the handmaid of the Lord" imply Mary's mediate, remote co-operation in the Redemption. Ambrose of Milan expressly teaches: "Christ's Passion did not require any support". In the power of the grace of Redemption merited by Christ, Mary, by her spiritual entering into the sacrifice of her Divine Son for men, made atonement for the sins of men, and (de congruo) merited the application of the redemptive grace of Christ. In this manner she co-operates in the subjective redemption of mankind.

Theologians distinguish between "remote cooperation", by which she consents to the Incarnation and gives birth to the Son of God, and "immediate cooperation", in which she willingly unites herself to her Son's Passion and offers him back to the Father. Philosophers also draw a distinction between merit de condigno (Christ's merit), which is based on justice, and merit proprie de congruo (Mary's merit), founded on the friendship of charity. In his encyclical on the Immaculate Conception, Ad diem illum, Pope Pius X said, "...since Mary carries it over all in holiness and union with Jesus Christ, and has been associated by Jesus Christ in the work of redemption, she merits for us de congruo, in the language of theologians, what Jesus Christ merits for us de condigno." Where it concerns post-Assumption graces, it is a pious opinion that the entirety of them come through the "intercession" of Mary, a concept that is in itself in need of clarification.

== History ==
Around the year 180 AD, the Church Father Irenaeus, in his work Against Heresies, wrote that "Mary become the cause of salvation, both to herself and the whole human race" given her fiat ("let it be").

The concept was especially common in the late Middle Ages, when it was promoted heavily among the Franciscans, and often resisted by the Dominicans. It is an idea which was the subject of considerable theological debate, reaching a peak in the 15th century. By the early 16th century the hopes of the concept becoming Catholic doctrine had receded, and have never seriously revived.

A number of theologians have discussed the concept over the years, from the 19th-century Father Frederick William Faber, to the 20th-century Mariologist Father Gabriel Roschini. In his 1946 publication Compendium Mariologiae, Roschini explained that Mary did not only participate in the birth of the physical Jesus, but, with conception, she entered with him into a spiritual union. The divine salvation plan, being not only material, includes a permanent spiritual unity with Christ. Most Mariologists agree with this position.

The term Co-Redemptress was used by Pope Leo XIII in 1894: "For in the Rosary all the part that Mary took as our co-Redemptress comes to us..."

In the year of 1914, the Pope Pius X granted an indulgence to those who recited a prayer containing the following passage: I bless thy holy Name, I praise thine exalted privilege of being truly Mother of God, ever Virgin, conceived without stain of sin, Co-Redemptrix of the human race. The prayer is found in the Raccolta of 1950 with Vatican approval.

In his encyclical on the Immaculate Conception, Ad diem illum, Pope Pius X said, "...since Mary carries it over all in holiness and union with Jesus Christ, and has been associated by Jesus Christ in the work of redemption, she merits for us de congruo, in the language of theologians, what Jesus Christ merits for us de condigno."

The title tends to be most popular among conservative Catholics. Modern proponents see some support in Inter sodalicia, a 1918 commemorative letter of Pope Benedict XV to a Roman sodality:

It was God's design that the Blessed Virgin Mary, apparently absent from the public life of Jesus, should assist him when he was dying nailed to the Cross. Mary suffered and, as it were, nearly died with her suffering Son; for the salvation of mankind she renounced her mother's rights and, as far as it depended on Her, offered her Son to placate divine justice; so we may well say that she with Christ redeemed mankind.

The first Pope to use the term "Co-redemptrix" was Pius XI in a Brief dated 20 July 1925 about the Queen of the Rosary of Pompeii: "Remember also that at Calvary you became the Co-redemptrix, cooperating with the crucifixion of your heart for the salvation of the world, together with your crucified Son."

In an allocution to pilgrims from Vicenza on 30 November 1933 Pius XI said:

From the nature of His work the Redeemer ought to have associated his Mother with his work. For this reason we invoke her under the title of Co-redemptrix. She gave us the Savior, she accompanied him in the work of redemption as far as the Cross itself, sharing with him the sorrows of the agony and of the death in which Jesus consummated the Redemption of mankind.

Finally in a radio message on the occasion of the closing of the Jubilee of the Redemption at Lourdes (28 April 1935) Pius XI stated: "Mother most faithful and most merciful, who as Co-redemptrix and partaker of thy dear Son's sorrows didst assist him as he offered the sacrifice of our Redemption on the altar of the Cross ... preserve in us and increase each day, we beseech thee, the precious fruits of our Redemption and thy compassion."

Pope Pius XII describes Mary as intimately associated with Christ in the work of redemption. In his encyclical Mystici Corporis Christi mentions: "It was she, the second Eve, who, free from all sin, original or personal, and always more intimately united with her Son, offered Him on Golgotha to the Eternal Father for all the children of Adam, sin-stained by his unhappy fall, and her mother's rights and her mother's love were included in the holocaust." In his encyclical Ad Caeli Reginam relates:

Now, in the accomplishing of this work of redemption, the Blessed Virgin Mary was most closely associated with Christ; and so it is fitting to sing in the sacred liturgy: "Near the cross of Our Lord Jesus Christ there stood, sorrowful, the Blessed Mary, Queen of Heaven and Queen of the World". (...) For "just as Christ, because He redeemed us, is our Lord and king by a special title, so the Blessed Virgin also (is our queen), on account of the unique manner in which she assisted in our redemption, by giving of her own substance, by freely offering Him for us, by her singular desire and petition for, and active interest in, our salvation."

In the encyclical Haurietis Aquas Pius XII states: "For, by God's Will, in carrying out the work of human Redemption the Blessed Virgin Mary was inseparably linked with Christ in such a manner that our salvation sprang from the love and the sufferings of Jesus Christ to which the love and sorrows of His Mother were intimately united."

Attempts to promote a fifth Marian dogma were undertaken in the 1920s through 1940s, but Pius XII decided not to proceed with the definition of the dogma. In 1941 it was published Mother of the Saviour and our Interior life, the first translation into English of a volume in which the thomist theologian Garrigou-Lagrange explained Virgin Mary's active role in divine Redemption.

The concluding chapter of the Second Vatican Council's apostolic constitution Lumen gentium, which many theologians hold to be a comprehensive summary of Roman Catholic Mariology, refers to Mary as "Advocate, Auxiliatrix, Adjutrix, and Mediatrix," but does not use the term "Co-Redemptrix." Some, in particular the adherents of the Amsterdam visions, have petitioned for a dogmatic definition of Co-Redemptrix, along with Mediatrix, but recent high-level comments in the church have not encouraged these hopes.

Pope John Paul II referred to Mary as "Co-redemptrix" on at least seven occasions.

On April 7, 2017, the Congregation of the Mother Coredemptrix was renamed to the Congregation of the Mother of the Redeemer upon the recommendation of the Congregation for the Evangelization of Peoples, due to the "theological ambiguity" of the title Coredemptrix.

Although he did not explicitly use the title of "Co-Redemptrix", in the General Audience of 13 May 2026 Pope Leo XIV recalled that Mary "She brings forth children in the Son, loved in the eternal Beloved who came among us" and that there is a "singular place reserved for the Virgin Mary in the work of Redemption" of which Lumen Gentium 60–62 speaks, offering her own sufferings and those of her Son on Calvary and being associated with the Redeemer "in an absolutely unique way". In his message to the Plenary of the Pontifical Biblical Commission, he also stated: "Let us contemplate in particular the Sorrowful Mother together with Jesus at the foot of the Cross: as Mother, she suffers on Calvary the sufferings of her Son and shares in them with a heart full of faith, offering her piercing sorrow for the good of all. In this way, her intercession acquires for us a unique value."

== Proposed dogmatic definition ==
There have been efforts to propose a formal dogmatization, which has had both popular and ecclesiastical support. The proposal for the dogma is often associated with the alleged apparitions of The Lady of All Nations to Ida Peerdeman, in Amsterdam, Netherlands. The visionary reported that the apparition of Mary repeatedly instructed her to petition Pope Pius XII to dogmatically define Mary's spiritual motherhood under the threefold title of Coredemptrix, Mediatrix, and Advocate. The apparitions have the approval of the diocesan ordinary, Bishop Jozef Marianus Punt of Haarlem-Amsterdam. This came after the Congregation for the Doctrine of the Faith had affirmed the earlier finding of Bishop Johannes Huibers, a predecessor, that he "found no evidence of the supernatural nature of the apparitions". The CDF affirmed his position on 13 March 1957 and again on 24 May 1972 and 25 May 1974.

The possibility of such a dogma was brought up at the Second Vatican Council by Italian, Spanish, and Polish bishops, but not dealt with on the council floor. Subsequently, "not only did the Council not take the route of a dogmatic pronouncement, but it positively avoided using 'coredemptio'", and popes pointedly did not include such language in their encyclicals.

In the early 1990s Mark Miravalle of the Franciscan University of Steubenville and author of the book Mary: Coredemptrix, Mediatrix, Advocate launched a popular petition to urge Pope John Paul II to declare Mary Coredemptrix ex cathedra. Salvatore Perrella of the Pontifical Theological Faculty of the Marianum in Rome thought that this indicated "...a certain 'under-appreciation' of the Council's teaching, which is perhaps believed to be not completely adequate to illustrate comprehensively Mary's co-operation in Christ's work of Redemption."

== Scriptural basis ==
The New Testament is commonly cited in favour of this teaching:

- John 19:25–27: "Now there stood by the cross of Jesus, his mother, and his mother's sister, Mary of Cleophas, and Mary Magdalen. When Jesus therefore had seen his mother and the disciple standing whom he loved, he saith to his mother: Woman, behold thy son. After that, he saith to the disciple: Behold thy mother. And from that hour, the disciple took her to his own." Lumen gentium, the Dogmatic Constitution on the Church, states, "...In this singular way she cooperated by her obedience, faith, hope and burning charity in the work of the Saviour in giving back supernatural life to souls. Wherefore she is our mother in the order of grace."
- Colossians 1:24: "[I, Paul,] now rejoice in my sufferings for you, and fill up those things that are wanting of the sufferings of Christ, in my flesh, for his body, which is the church”.

== Opposing arguments ==
Arguments opposed are that such a dogma might subtract from the redemptive role of Jesus Christ. Frederick William Faber says,

Our Blessed Lord is the sole Redeemer of the world in the true and proper sense of the word, and in this sense no creature whatsoever shares the honor with Him, neither can it be said of Him without impiety that He is co-redeemer with Mary, ... [although] in a degree to which no others approach, our Blessed Lady co-operated with Him in the redemption of the world.

Faber recognized that the term Co-Redemptrix usually requires some explanation in modern English because so often the prefix co- tends to imply complete equality. He also explains that, "Thus, so far as the literal meaning of the word is concerned, it would appear that the term co-redemptress is not theologically true, or at least does not express the truth it certainly contains with theological accuracy."

This concern is shared by Father Salvatore Perrella.

The semantic weight of this expression would require a good many other qualifications and clarifications, especially in the case under examination, where she who is wished to be proclaimed co-redeemer is, in the first place, one who is redeemed, albeit in a singular manner, and who participates in Redemption primarily as something she herself receives. Thus we see the inadequacy of the above-mentioned term for expressing a doctrine which requires, even from the lexical standpoint, the proper nuances and distinctions of levels.

It was rejected by the Vatican in the past because of serious theological difficulties. In August 1996, a Mariological Congress was held in Częstochowa, Poland, where a commission was established in response to a request of the Holy See. The congress sought the opinion of scholars present there regarding the possibility of proposing a fifth Marian dogma on Mary as Coredemptrix, Mediatrix, and Advocate. The commission unanimously declared that it was not opportune, voting 23–0 against the proposed dogma.

Another argument is that it would also complicate ecumenical efforts for a better understanding of the role of the Blessed Virgin Mary in the salvation mystery of Jesus Christ.

By 1998 it was doubtful the Vatican was going to consider new Marian dogmas. The papal spokesman stated "This is not under study by the Holy Father nor by any Vatican congregation or commission." The Mariologist Salvatore Perrella stated the petition was "theologically inadequate, historically a mistake, pastorally imprudent and ecumenically unacceptable."

When asked in an interview in 2000 whether the Catholic Church would go along with the desire to solemnly define Mary as Co-redemptrix, then-Cardinal Ratzinger (later Pope Benedict XVI) responded that, "...the formula 'Co-redemptrix' departs to too great an extent from the language of Scripture and of the Fathers and therefore gives rise to misunderstandings. ...Everything comes from Him [Christ], as the Letter to the Ephesians and the Letter to the Colossians, in particular, tell us; Mary, too, is everything she is through Him. The word 'Co-redemptrix' would obscure this origin. A correct intention being expressed in the wrong way".

On at least three occasions — in December 2019, April 2020 and March 2021 — Pope Francis expressed his clear opposition to using the title "Co-redemptrix".

René Laurentin, theologian specializing in Mariology, said “There is no mediation or co-redemption except in Christ. He alone is God.”
