= Eusepi =

Eusepi is an Italian surname. Notable people with the surname include:

- Cecilia Eusepi (1910–1928), Italian Roman Catholic diarist
- Claudio Eusepi (born 1956), Italian footballer
- Umberto Eusepi (born 1989), Italian footballer
