= Frane Franić =

Catholic archbishop of Split-Makarska (1912–2007)

The Most Reverend Frane Franić
- Archbishop of Split-Makarska
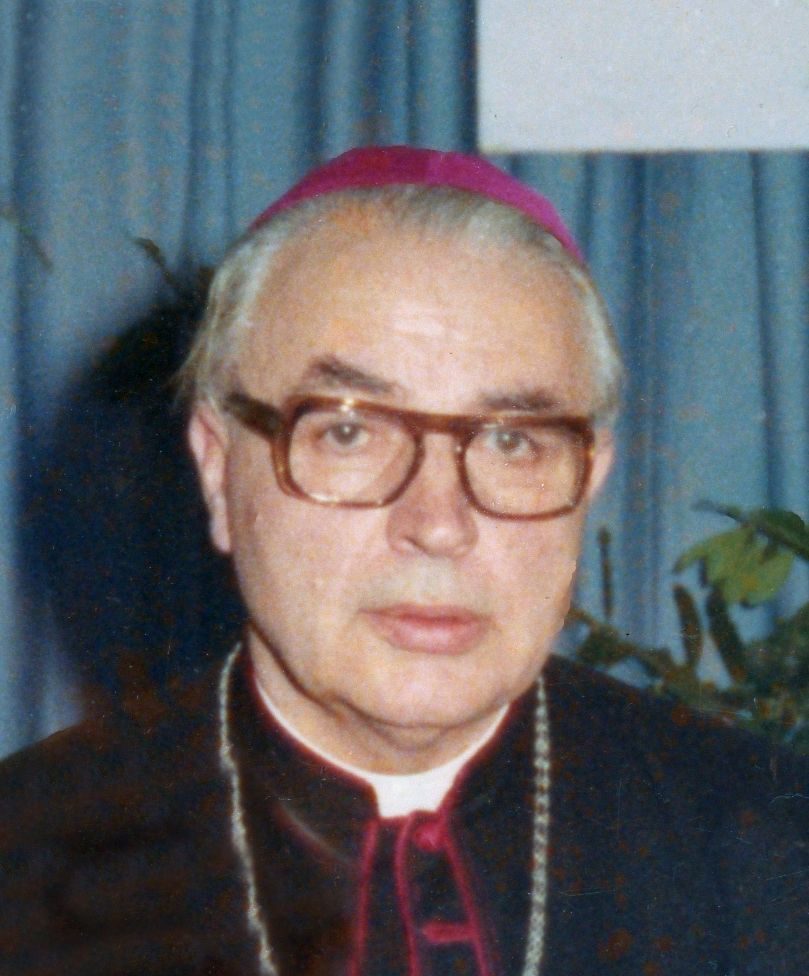
- Archbishop Frane Franić in 1975
- Church: Catholic Church
- Archdiocese: Split-Makarska
- Metropolis: Split-Makarska
- Appointed: 27 July 1969
- Retired: 10 September 1988
- Predecessor: Office established
- Successor: Ante Jurić
- Other post: Bishop of Split Makarska (1960–69) Apostolic Administrator of Split-Makarska (1954–60) Auxiliary Bishop of Split-Makarska (1950–54) Titular Bishop of Agathopolis (1950–60)

Orders
- Ordination: 25 December 1936
- Consecration: 17 December 1950 by Kvirin Klement Bonefačić

Personal details
- Born: 29 December 1912 Kaštel Kambelovac, Kaštela, Dalmatia, Austria-Hungary
- Died: 17 March 2007 (aged 94) Split, Croatia
- Buried: Co-Cathedral of St. Peter, Split, Croatia
- Denomination: Catholic
- Coat of arms

Frane Franić (29 December 1912 – 17 March 2007) was a prelate of the Catholic Church who served as the Archbishop of Split-Makarska from 1969 until his retirement in 1988. He also served as the last Bishop of Split-Makarska, before the diocese was elevated to the status of an archdiocese, from 1960 to 1969.

Prior to that, Franić was the apostolic administrator of the same diocese from 1954 to 1960, and an auxiliary bishop, holding the title of the titular bishop of Agathopolis, from 1950 to 1954.

Franić belonged to a group of conservative prelates willing to engage in a dialogue with the communist government of Yugoslavia. As an archbishop, Franić promoted a dialogue between Christianity and Marxism, entering in conflict with the Archbishop of Zagreb, Franjo Kuharić, who was an opponent of the dialogue. After 1960s, Franić also promoted ecumenical dialogue.

== Early life and education ==
Franić was born in Kaštel Kambelovac in southern Croatia, then part of Austria-Hungary on 29 December 29 1912. He attended elementary school there from 1919 to 1923. From 1923 to 1931 he attended the Episcopal Seminary, a classical grammar school with public rights. In Split, he enrolled in the Central Theological School and completed philosophical and theological studies. On 25 December 1936, he was ordained as a priest. After the ordination, Franić served as a religion teacher and prefect of the Split seminary. Franić went to postgraduate studies in Rome at the Pontifical Gregorian University, where, in 1941, he gained a doctorate in theological sciences after successfully defending his doctoral thesis titled De iustitia originali et de peccato originali secundum Duns Scotum.

== Episcopacy ==
Franić was appointed auxiliary bishop of the Diocese of Split-Makarska in 1950 and in 1954, he became the apostolic administrator of the diocese. After returning from Rome, he held various positions in Split. For many years he was professor of philosophy, Latin, and religion at the Split High School of Liturgy, chaplain of the Prison of St. Roka (1941–1943), a prefect at the Seminary (1942–1945), a librarian in the small seminary and director of the central theological seminary (1945–1956).

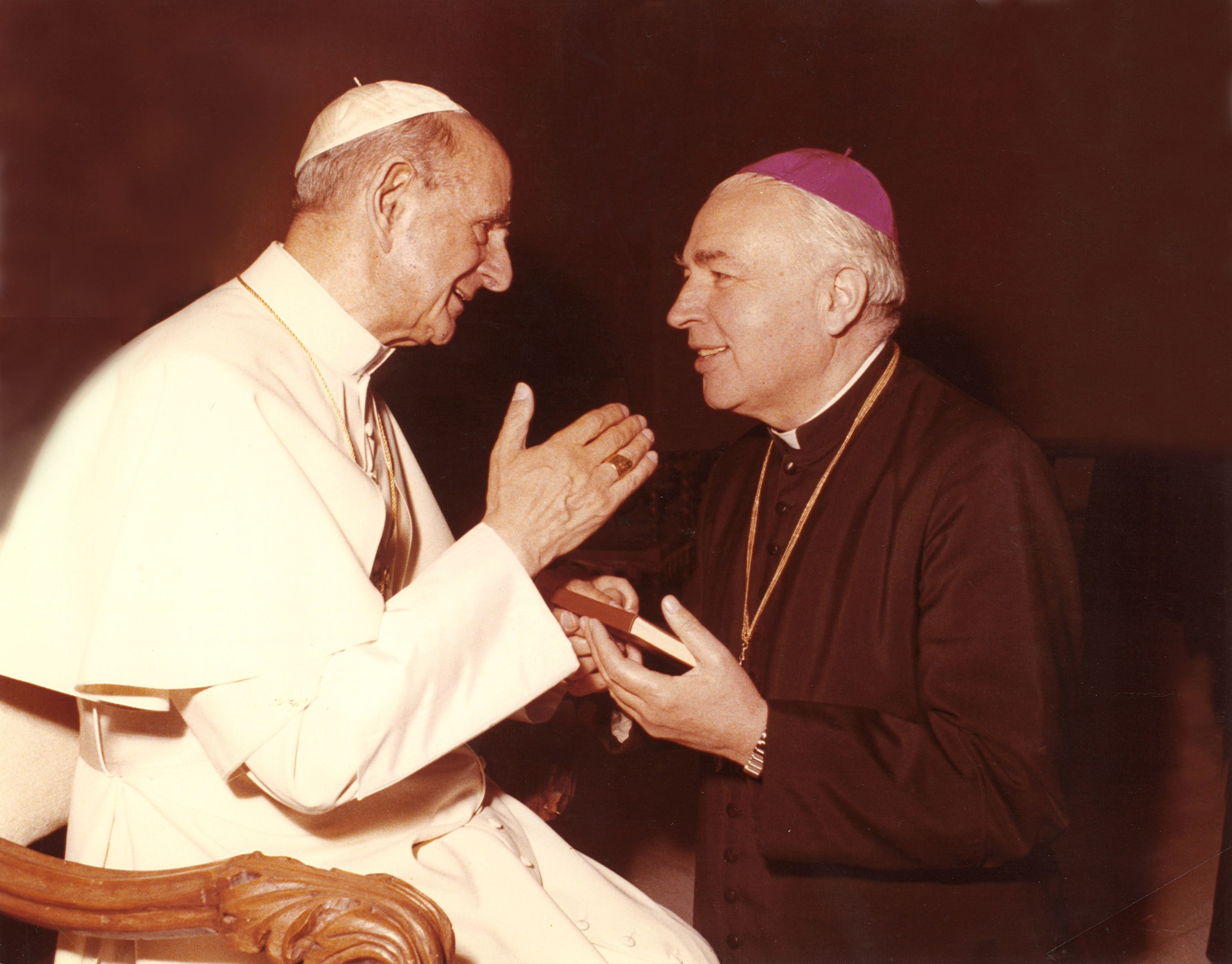
Pope Paul VI and Archbishop Frane Franić of Split and Makarska in the Vatican

He was promoted to Assistant Bishop on 17 December 1950, and since then acted as General Vicar. In 1953 he restored the Vjesnik of Split-Makarska diocese. In 1954 he was ordained as the Split-Makarska bishop. When Pope Paul VI established the Split-Makarska archbishopric on July 27, 1969, Franić was elevated to be the resident Archbishop of the metropolis. He remained at the head of the Split-Makarska Archdiocese until his retirement, October 16, 1988.

The communist government tried to impose its control of clergy by establishing various clerical associations. The Episcopal Conference of Yugoslavia at first discouraged, and then banned membership in such organisations. When such an association was established in Croatia in 1953, Franić issued a ban on the clerical associations, entailing a suspension if violation would occur. The order was sent to all priests in the Diocese of Split-Makarska, and according to Franić, was received "enthusiastically" by 90 percent of the clergy. In 1959, 18 priests in total were suspended in Croatia.

For his opposition, Franić was harassed by the communists. A week after he issued the ban, Franić was surrounded by several communists while visiting a village parish and was threatened with death. A few days later, he was taken to the occupied Franciscan friary in Makarska and was threatened again. In the fall of 1958, three men ambushed him and threatened to set him on fire. The communists closed the diocesan-owned theological faculty and seminary in Split for six years as a response. The closing of the Split seminary created a problem for raising future Dalmatian clergy. For that reason, Archbishop of Zadar Mate Garković opened a seminary in Zadar in 1959. When the Split seminary was reopened in 1963, the Dalmatian bishops tried to resolve the issue of the two existing seminaries by trying to establish a single bilocated institution. However, Franić was opposed to this idea, which led to a decline in relations between the Diocese of Split and the Archdiocese of Zadar.

At the very end of the Second Vatican Council, the Dalmatian bishops, including Franić, held a meeting in Rome on 18 November 1965. The bishop of Zadar Josip Arnerić proposed moving the two-year study of philosophy from Split to Zadar. The proposal was accepted by all the bishops except Garković. The meeting ended in agreement that the priests should receive two years of philosophical education in Zadar and four years of theology in Split. Garković sent the record of the meeting to the Holy See, which was satisfied with the agreement. The bishops met again at a friary in Čiovo on 6 May 1966, where Franić proposed that the Rome agreement should be implemented in the academic year of 1968/69. He further proposed that the head of the single institution should be the bishop of Split, while the studies of philosophy and theology in Zadar and Split would be headed by two different deans. His proposal included that an assembly of the Dalmatian bishops as the supreme organ of the college should appoint professors, while the deans would be elected among the professors. Garković proposed that both the professors from Zadar and from Split should receive the same payment. All of the proposals were accepted.

=== Second Vatican Council ===
Franić was among twenty-five Yugoslav bishops at the time who participated at the Second Vatican Council and among four Yugoslav bishops that served as members of various commissions. Franić himself served as a member of the Theological Commission, together with the Archbishop of Zagreb Franjo Šeper. The Yugoslav bishops were divided between the traditionalists, progressives, and those who held mixed views, like Franić. In his own words, he took a traditionalist stance on some and progressive on other issues. From the 1960s to the mid 1980s Franic was a promoter of the reforms of the Second Vatican Council and a liberal. He pioneered dialogue between different Christian denominations to promote Christian unity; dialogue with unbelievers and bold "rapprochement with the liberalising Titoist self-management socialism." During the war and the postwar world he turned increasingly conservative. Franić said that the Council "condemned godless communism, but it opened the doors to a dialogue with Marxism".

Franić and Šeper supported the introduction of vernacular for Holy Mass and were proponents of ecumenism in an effort to mend the old conflicts between the Catholic Church and other particular churches. The split between Šeper and Franić was on the issue of married deacons, with Šeper supporting the move, while Franić and fifteen other Yugoslav bishops opposed the idea. Franić was a traditionalist on the issue of the Pope's primacy and suggested that the vow of poverty of religious orders should apply to secular clergy as well.

During the discussions about the episcopate at the Second Vatican Council, Franić insisted that the Council should adopt a dogmatic definition on the origin of the episcopacy, as stemming from the Devine law, not just the ecclesiastical law. In the end, the Council gave a non-dogmatic definition of the divine origin of episcopacy. Franić also wanted the Council to give a better interpretation of the episcopal power and order to confirm the authority of the bishops. Franić held that episcopacy is a different sacrament from that of a priesthood, and is "firmly rooted as such in the Christian tradition, which is based on the Holy Scripture". In his proposal to the Council, Franić stated that the "episcopacy is a sacrament, and as such it must be rooted in the divine law".

At the beginning of the Second Vatican Council, he was a member of the Theological Standing Committee (1960–1962), and was a member of the Parliament's Doctrinal Commission (1962–1965). Upon completion of the Parliament, he was an external member of the Roman Congregation for Sacraments and Worship (1968–1973 and 1975–1980) and the Congregation for the Declaration of Saints (1975 to 1985).

== Metropolitan ==
Frane Franić became one of the leading intellectuals supporting dialogue with Marxism and the state authorities, others being theologians like Tomislav Šagi-Bunić, Vjekoslav Bajsić and Josip Turčinović. When the Archbishop of Zagreb Cardinal Franjo Šeper became the Prefect of the Congregation for the Doctrine of the Faith in Rome, Franjo Kuharić entered the discussion as his successor as the archbishop of Zagreb. Franić, like other clerics who were open to collaboration with the state government, was acceptable to the regime as Šeper's successors. He complained to the state authorities that Šeper doesn't allow other bishops to influence the issue of his successor.

In November 1969, the Diocese of Split-Makarska was elevated to an archdiocese. The decision was made in Rome, rather than the Episcopal Conference of Yugoslavia, which couldn't come to a prescribed two-thirds majority for such a decision. Although the Vatican was first inclined to Archdiocese of Zadar, thanks to Franić's intervention, Split was chosen for elevation. Franić recommended himself to the state authorities, claiming that the Vatican's support for Zadar and its archbishop Marijan Oblak would lead to the strengthening of the problematic line for the communist authorities in Zagreb. Thus, the Yugoslav ambassador in Rome Vjekoslav Cvrlje supported Split. At the same time, Franić portrayed himself to the Vatican as a man of dialogue and ecumenism, which was the main reason why the Holy See decided to elevate the Diocese of Split-Makarska to an archdiocese, honoring Franić's efforts in that field.

Franić became an archbishop when the Diocese of Split-Makarska was elevated to the status of an archdiocese in November 1969. He showed interest in dialogue quite early and in November 1970, Franić accepted an invitation to lecture on theology and revolution at the Seminar for Political and Sociological Research at the Faculty of Law in Split. In return, he invited Srđan Vrcan to lecture at the Theological Academy in Split. According to author Ramet, Franić tried to portray himself as loyal politically. On numerous occasions, Franić said that "self-managing socialism – if one takes atheism out of it – is, at this historical moment, the best social system".

In 1973, Franić published a book titled Putovi dijaloga (Dialogue Routes) in which he explained that Marxism is useful to Christianity. Franic wrote in his book, "It is our opinion that the dialectical-historical materialism will end up playing a positive role with respect to Christianity, because under the criticism of that materialism, Christianity must purify itself and renew spiritually." Trying to establish a basis for the dialogue between Christianity and Marxism, Franić wrote that the Church needs to differentiate between what is essential and what is not essential to Marxism.

Pedro Ramet wrote that Franić defined the church as a "hierarchical community of faith hope and love." Pedro Ramet wrote that at a sermon held in New York City in 1980, Franić exclaimed that he "rejected the democratization of the Church, whether on the Western or the Yugoslav model and condemning it as 'the great schism and heresy of the age, more dangerous to the church than was Protestantism in its time.'"

As a metropolitan, Franić led other Dalmatian bishops, who were very conservative in dogmatics on one hand, but advocated Christian-Marxist dialogue and ecumenism on the other. As such, they stood against the Croatian mainstream led by Šeper, who advocated internal church reforms, but rejected any dialogue with Marxism. Such a split cannot be contributed to individual convictions of bishops, but also Zagreb-Split rivalry. There was no consensus among the Catholic dialogue partners on political objectives. According to Bucheanu, "while Šagi-Bunić is decidedly against any alliance of Church and state and called for an ideologically neutral, rule-of-law, Franić sought a Christian-socialist alliance with an anti-Western character."

Franić opposed the activity of Kršćanska sadašnjost (KS) a Catholic publishing society established by Cardinal Franjo Šeper in Zagreb. The KS published books and journals to fill the vacuum in Christian literature after World War II. It also promoted the policies of the Second Vatican Council. Franic, Kuharić, Šeper, and others had misgivings about KS because they changed their status from church jurisdiction to state jurisdiction; they had a breach of disciple by reorganizing the society without consulting the bishops; their alleged subordination to the communist party. In 1978 Franic banned the publisher and in 1982 the Archdiocese of Split-Makarska and the Diocese of Đakovo forbade its priests to be associated with the KS. Moreover, Franić, along with the bishops of Dubrovnik and Mostar-Duvno forbade the priests who were connected to the KS to say mass.

As the Archbishop of Split, he summoned the fiftieth-fifth Split Synod (1986–87), and the texts of the Synod were published by the Church under the title 'Church Today and Tomorrow'.

For a short time, his secretary was Fr. Većeslav Šupuk.

== Medjugorje phenomena ==
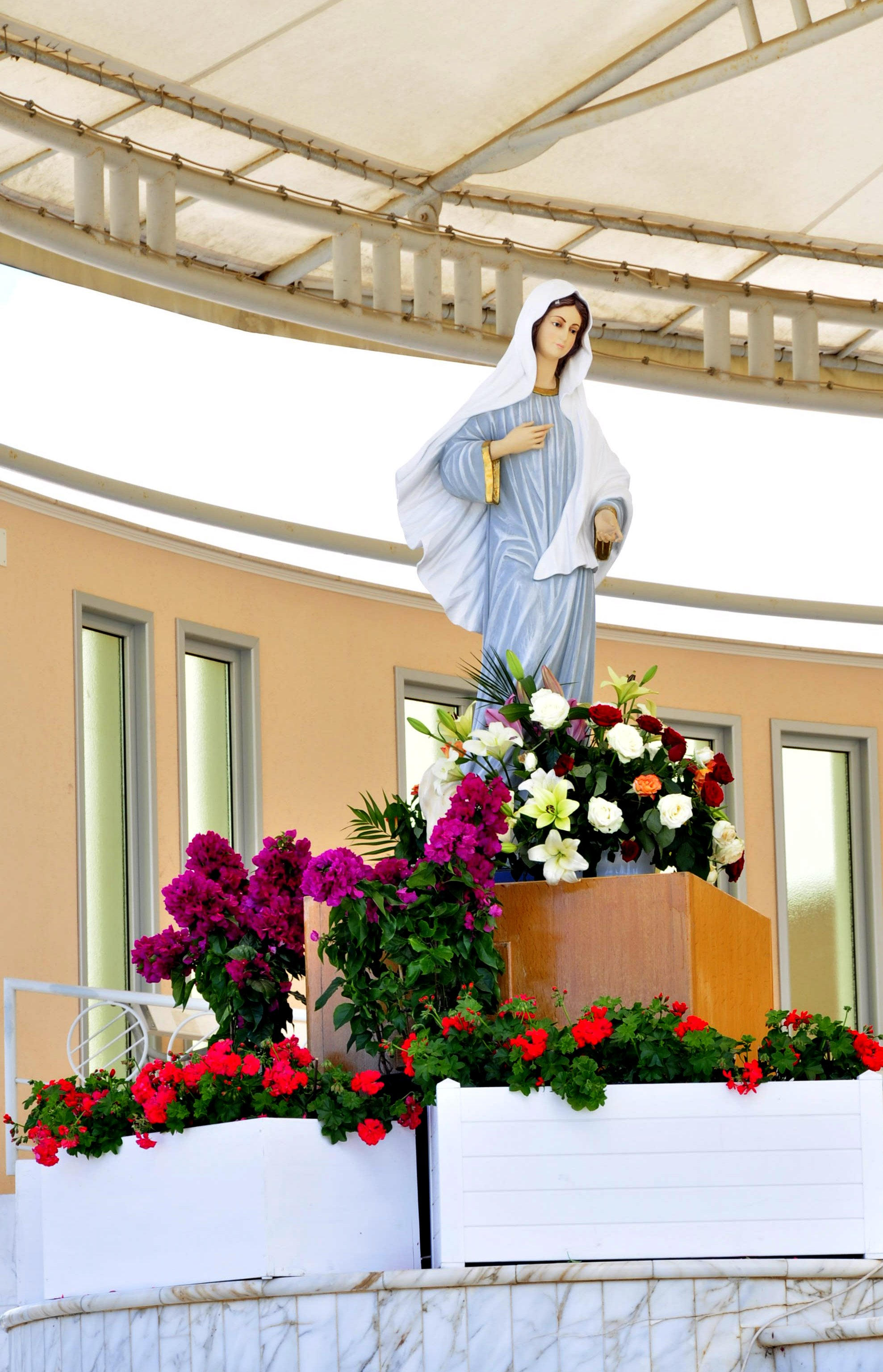
St. James church statue of Our Lady of Medjugorje

Various bishops supported the Medjugorje apparitions, of whom Franić, a senior Croatian cleric, was one of the most prominent. Out of forty-two Yugoslav bishops, he was the one supporting the apparitions. Franic supported the Franciscans and seers of Medjugorje, in fact issued a public statement in their support. Randall Sullivan wrote that in regards to conversions, Franic said, "Medjugorje has accomplished more in two years than all our pastoral action has done in forty." Franić is regarded as one of the most important apologist for the Medjugorje apparitions, along with French mariologist René Laurentin. The two were known for supporting supernatural phenomenons banned by the Holy See, including Vassula Rydén, a self-proclaimed mystic, and seer.

Franić visited Medjugorje for the first time on 21 December 1981, six months after the first claimed apparitions. Mladen Parlov wrote that Franić said that he received an inner revelation to "increase his personal prayers from three to four hours a day." In 1988 while visiting Medjugorje he again received an inner urge but this time to increase his personal prayers from four to five hours a day. On the same visit he also received a prophecy about himself, as told to him by one of the alleged seers Marija Pavlović. According to Mladen Parlov the prophecy stated that "the Madonna blesses the archbishop and he will have to endure a lot on the highest level because of my name" and "Our Lady also invited him to love everyone, not just Catholics and not just Croats." This touched him deeply and opened a new way to experience his own pastoral ministry and as a supporter and defender of Medjugorje.

Franić later said that in 1986, because of his support for the Medjugorje phenomenon, he was accused in Rome for collaboration with the communists and that there was a process against him without his knowledge with the intention to replace him. He revealed that he received a suggestion to retire for health reasons, which he refused. He was not dismissed. He received Pope John Paul II's congratulation for his gold mass on 15 December 1996, and interpreted it as a fulfillment of that prophecy and convinced him even more of the truth of Our Lady's apparitions in Medjugorje.

As a member of the Yugoslav Episcopal Conference of 1985 that studied and voted on the Medjugorje apparitions, he voted against the local Bishop Pavao Žanić and supported the visionaries. Because of his support for the apparitions, his long-time friendship with Žanić ended. Franić accused Žanić of using the wrong "methodological approach" in investigating the apparitions, claiming Žanić was methodologically wrong in defaming the supporters of the Medjugorje apparitions - the Franciscans, individuals and the seers. According to Mladen Parlov, Franić said that the Medjugorje apparitions should be studied using the criteria of mystical theology which knows how to distinguish ordinary from ecstatic prayer. Franić explains that some ambiguous statements and lies of the seers should be understood in a way that does not contradict the truth of the apparitions.

In Medjugorje on June 24, 1981 Our Lady of Medjugorje appeared to five teenagers and one ten year old child for the first time. According to Paul Kengor, she came with the "same message as Fatima: peace, conversion, fasting, reconciliation, repentance, penance, reparation and prayer."

Archbishop Frane Franic, Father Guido Sommavilla, Monsignor Rene Laurentin and others were known for supporting "supernatural" phenomenon banned by the Holy See. One example is Vassula Rydén, a self-proclaimed mystic, and seer. According to Paolo Apolito, Franic, stating his opinion in the Medjugorje newsletter of Genoa, announced that Vassula is faithful “to all revealed truths as they are taught and explained by the Catholic Church." Father Guido Sommavilla revealed that the Vatican made mistakes in regards to Padre Pio and the Blessed Sister Faustina Kowalskawho already within the twentieth century. According to Rene Laurentin, Cardinal Ratzinger told the bishops of Mexico that the decision about Vassula was not the result of a thorough investigation.

A notable Croatian Catholic journalist and vaticanist Smiljana Rendić said in 1985 of Franić's support for Medjugorje that they were "manipulations", calling it "grotesque". She referred to his involvement in the apparitions in another diocese as "interference without precedence in Church history".

== Retirement ==
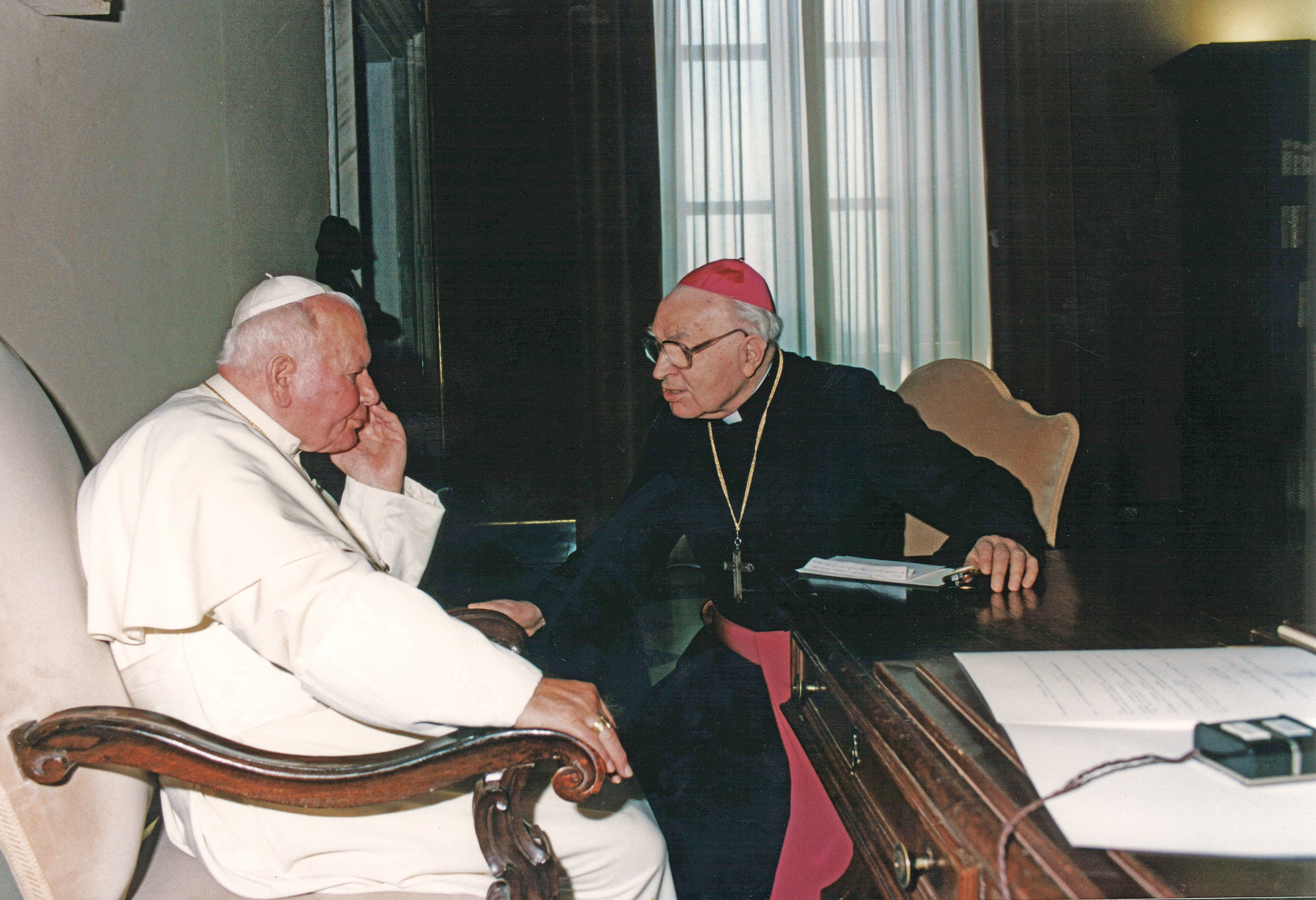
Pope John Paul II and Franić in 2000

Franić retired in September 1988. During the Croatian War for Independence and in the increasingly troubled postwar world he turned increasingly conservative. Franić was very disturbed by the war and felt guilt for his dialogue with the Eastern Orthodox Serbs and Marxists. He supported the governance of Croatia's President Franjo Tuđman, while the archbishop of Zagreb Kuharić was unwilling to do so. In a verbal conflict between Kuharić and Tuđman from 1996 about the role of the Catholic Church in Croatia's society, Kuharić turned his back to Kuharić and supported Tuđman.

Parts of the Serb Orthodox clergy were very anti-ecumenist and in 1997, the Serbian Orthodox Church issued Appeal Against Ecumenism. This appeal effectively ended the ecumenical attempts in ex-Yugoslavia. This was the moment that led Franić to abandon his previously held ecumenical positions towards the Eastern Orthodox Serbs. Instead, he became one of the main supporters Tuđman and very nationalistic.

Franić died in Firule hospital in Split. He was buried on 21 March 2007 in the Co-Cathedral of St. Peter. His funeral ceremony led by the Archbishop of Zagreb Josip Bozanić and was attended by numerous bishops from Croatia, Bosnia and Herzegovina, Serbia, Montenegro, and Italy.

== Publications ==
He published several theological works including:

- De iustitia originali et peccato originali secundum (Rome, 1941),
- History of philosophy (Split, 1967 and 1972), the Book of Dialogue Paths (Split, 1973), their Speaking Speeches Interventus in Concilio Vaticano II (Split, 1975)
- A collection of Christmas, Lent and Easter sermons, messages and epistles, You will be witnesses to me (Split, 1996)
- The Church, the Column of Truth – Memories of My Doctrine and Activities in II. Vatican Council (Split, 1998)
- The Church, the Pillar of Truth - Pontifical Antonianum University (May 13, 1999)
- Dialogue Routes (Split, 2000, Overprint) and Dialogue Routes 2. (Zagreb 2001).

== See also ==
- Catholic Church in Croatia
- Website: Frane Franic To translate click this link and follow directions
