= Gabriel Roschini =

Italian Catholic priest and theologian (1900–1977)

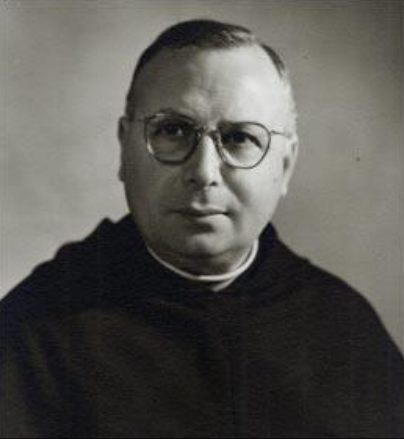
Portrait of Roschini

Gabriel Maria Roschini, OSM (December 19, 1900 – September 12, 1977), was an Italian Roman Catholic priest and professor of Mariology, who published over 900 titles on the subject. During the pontificate of Pope Pius XII, he worked closely with the Vatican on Marian publications. In light of the encyclopedic accuracy of his work, Roschini is considered one of the top two Mariologists of the 20th century.

His first major work, a four volume Mariology, Il Capolavoro di Dio, is judged to be the most comprehensive mariological presentation in the 20th century. In reviewing the state of Mariology Juniper Carol, S.J. wrote that Roschini's work was the "best and most complete in its kind." Several theologians called him "one of the most profound mariologists" and "irreplaceable".

== Life and contributions ==
Alessandro Natale Roschini was born in Castel Sant'Elia (Viterbo, Italy) in 1900. Upon entering the Servite order, he changed his name to Gabriel Maria (or Gabriele Maria) from his given name of Alessandro. In 1924, he received his ordination as a priest. After ordination Roschini was posted to Nepi, south of Rome, where he met Cecilia Eusepi and became her spiritual director. Roschini advised Euseppi until her death at age 18, and advised her to write her thoughts in a journal, which was later used in the process of her Beatification. In 1931 Roschini published a book titled "The Story of a Lily" about Eusepi's life. This was not the only book written by Roschini about a bed-ridden author, and in 1977 he published a book about the Mariology in the writings of Maria Valtorta.

Roschini was a doctor in philosophy and a master in sacred theology. He founded the journal Marianum in 1939 and directed it for thirty years. In 1950 during the reign of Pope Pius XII he founded the Marianum Theological Faculty, which is now a pontifical institute, and served as its rector. He was also instrumental in reviving the Marian Library, which was transferred to the International College of Saint Alexis Falconieri in 1946. Other roles included professor at the Lateran Pontifical University and the Marianum Pontifical Theology Faculty, as well as advisor for the Congregation for the Doctrine of the Faith and the Sacred Congregation for the Causes of the Saints.

== Impact on Mariology ==
During the pontificate of Pius XII, “the most Marian Pope in Church history”. Roschini worked closely with the Pontiff, arranging his own publications parallel to Papal mariological promulgations. During and after Vatican II, Roschini tried to adjust to the colder mariological spirit in his 1973 publication Il mistero di Maria considerato alla luce del mistero di Cristo e della Chiesa, an updated four volume handbook of mariology. But Roschini's views were not without their critics and Yves Congar, whose views tended towards Mariological minimalism, opposed Roschini for being too maximalist and wrote that Roschini's views made the work of Charles Balic (who was a maximalist) appear to be moderate. Altogether Roschini published over 900 titles, mostly on Mariology, in addition to his encyclopedic works, reviewing the mariological contributions of saints like Bernard of Clairvaux and Anthony of Padua. In 1950 he explained the mariology of Saint Thomas Aquinas. He detailed his mariology in a major work in the year 1952.

Earlier, Roschini had contributed with a new interpretation to the Mariological theology of the Co-redemptrix, which was not universally accepted. In his 1946 publication Compendium Mariologiae he explained that Mary not only participated physically in the life of Jesus by giving birth to him but also, when she conceived her divine Son, she entered into a spiritual union with him. The divine salvation plan, being not only material, includes permanent spiritual unity with Christ. Most mariologists agree with this position. Roschini entered new theological territory, when he defined the spiritual unity of Mary and Christ to form a "salvation pair", in which Mary is a true helper of her son. However, in this salvation duo, Mary is clearly subordinated to her son, according to Roschini, who, not wanting of course to elevate Mary to the level of divinity, insisted that Mary needed salvation through Christ like all other people. But, because she is the mother of God, the only mother of God among all women, Mary is someone unique. Sharing with all other people their human nature, she is different. She belongs to Christ, with whom she is spiritually united.

== Selected publications ==
- Il Capolavoro di Dio, Mariology in IV volumes, Roma 1933
- Catecismo mariano 1944
- Compendium Mariologiae, Roma, 1946
- La Mariologia di Sant'Antonio da Padova, in Marianum, Roma, 1946
- Compendium Mariologiae 1946
- Summa Mariologiae en 4 vol. 1948 (Latin)
- La Madonna secondo la fede e la Teologia, Roma, 1950
- La Mariologia di San Tommaso, Roma, 1950
- La Mariologia di Lorenzo da Brindisi, Roma, 1951
- Mariologia, Roma, 1952
- La Madonna del Santisimo Sacramento, Roma, 1953
- La Madonna secondo la fede e la teologia IV volumes, Roma 1953
- Il dottore Mariano, Studio sulla dottrina di San Bernardo di Chiaravalle, Roma 1953
- Dizionario di Mariologia, Roma, 1957
- Maria Santissima nella storia della salvezza, Roma, 1969
- Il misteri di Maria considerato alla luce del mistero di Cristo e della Chiesa, Roma 1973
- The Virgin Mary in the Writings of Maria Valtorta, Kolbe's Publications ISBN 2-920285-08-4 1989

== See also ==
- Rene Laurentin

== Sources and external links ==
- Pietro Parrotta, The Role of the Virgin Mary in Redemption in the Writings of Gabriele Maria Roschini, Varese, Italy: Eupress-FTL, 2002, ISBN 88-88446-01-X
- Remigius Bäumer, Gabriel Roschini, in Marienlexikon, St. Ottilien, 1994
- Publisher's Notice in the Second Italian Edition (1986), reprinted in English Edition, Gabriel Roschini, O.S.M. (1989). The Virgin Mary in the Writings of Maria Valtorta (English Edition). Kolbe's Publication Inc. ISBN 2-920285-08-4
