= Charles Balic =

Croatian Franciscan Mariologist

Charles Balic, O.F.M.
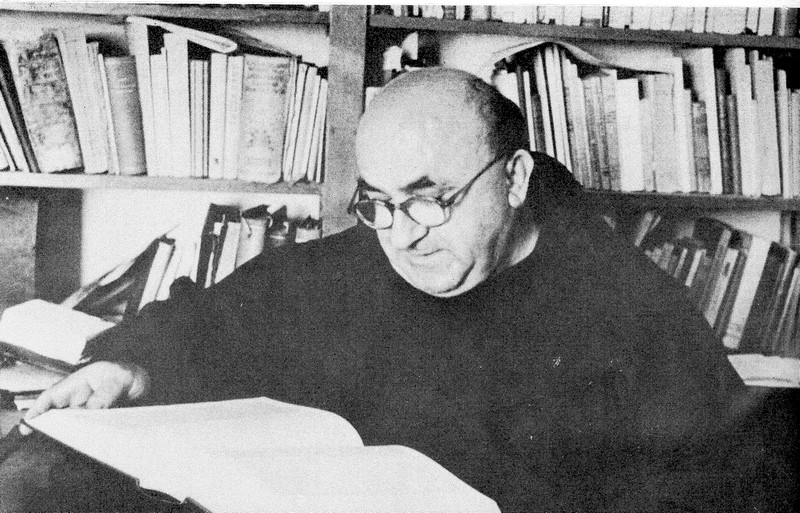
- Balic
- Born: 9 December 1899; Katuni, Croatia
- Died: 15 April 1977 (aged 77); Rome
- Other name: Lawrence - Karlo Balic
- Education: University of Louvain (Theology)

Ecclesiastical career
- Ordained: Franciscan
- Writings: see below

Charles Balic (Croatian: Karlo Balić; 9 December 1899 – 15 April 1977) was a Croatian Franciscan Mariologist. Friar Charles Balić was a famous theologian, specializing in the figure and works of John Duns Scotus, and Rector of the Pontifical University Antonianum of Rome. He was the founder of the Pontifical Academy of Mary and President of the International Scotistic Commission. He was the principal redactor in the editing of the chapter VIII of the Lumen gentium with "De Beata" redaction. He has been important for the ecumenical mariology. Balic is considered as one of the top representative of the "Marian movement" in the 20th century: his appointment was conclusive for the proclamation of the dogma of the assumption.

== Biography ==
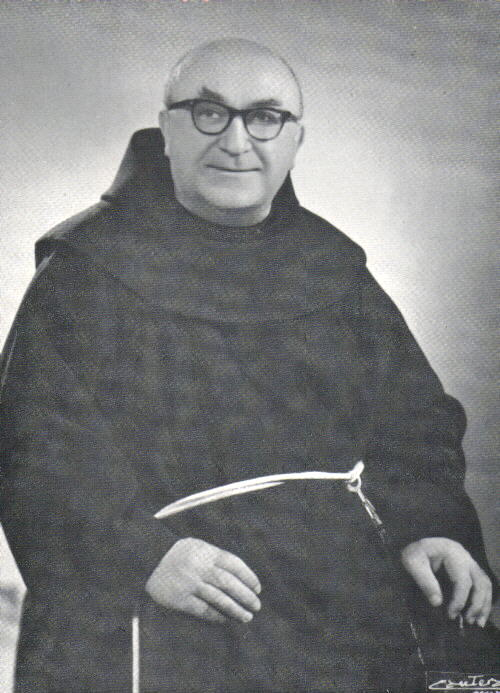
Carlo Balic

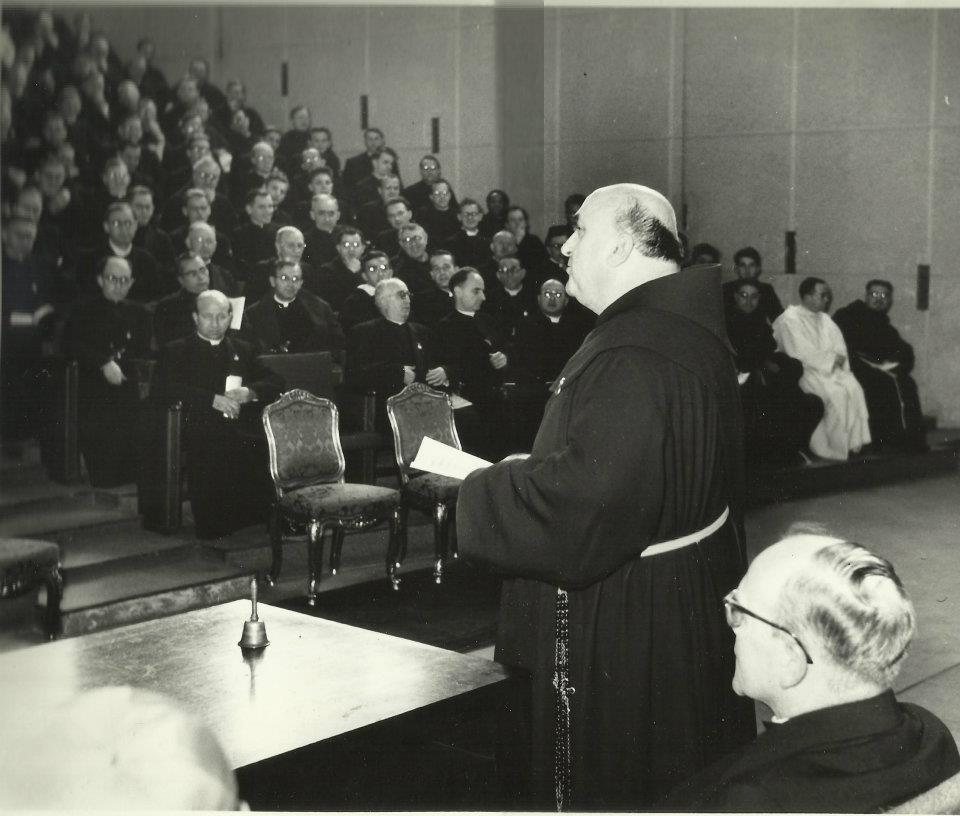
Mariological Congress

Karlo Balić was born in the village of Katuni near Šestanovac, Croatia. Entering the Franciscan Order in 1917, through the province of the Most Holy Redeemer of Dalmatia, he was ordained to the Priesthood in 1923. Successively, he was sent to Louvain from where he received a Doctorate for a thesis on Franciscan Mariology of the 13th and 14th centuries.

Returning to Croatia, he served as lecturer in his Province until 1933, when he was sent to Rome to begin teaching in the new Pontifical Athenaeum Antonianum, where he gave his Inaugural Class, which was to become the beginning of his career. He later became the Rector Magnificus and had the Our Lady of the Assumption hall built.

Antonio Piolanti recalls Balić as “a titan of a man, built almost on an abyss of contrasts - a great soul of unlimited horizons and immense desires. A type of coincidentia oppositorum was easily detected in the vigorous spiritual physiognomy of this worthy son of strong and gentle Croatia: the heart of a child and Hieronymic impetus, the tenderness of a mother and authoritativeness of a leader, acute and penetrating intelligence, resolute and fiery determination, warm generosity and Dantesque indignation”.

== President of International Scotistic Commission ==
He was entrusted with the International Scotistic Commission to which he gave such a new impulse that he was considered a re-founder. He drew up, in fact, a new "way" for the critical edition of Scotus' Opera Omnia.

== Founder of the International Marian Pontifical Academy ==
Charged by the Order to preside over the Commissio Marialis Franciscana, he founded, in 1947, the Pontifical Academy of Mary , an entity for the coordination of all the Mariology Scholars of the world.

== Assumptionist Congresses ==
Through the academy, Balić began a series of Congresses on the Assumption which prepared the dogma of the Assumption: Rome 1947, Lisbon 1947, Madrid 1947; Montréal 1948; Buenos Aires 1948; Puy-en-Velay 1949; USA 1950.

== Pontifical Commission for the dogma of Assumption ==
Balić participated actively as a member of the Theological Commission appointed by Pope Pius XII for the proclamation of dogma and the redaction of Munificentissimus Deus document.

== International Mariological Marian Congresses ==
Seeing the valuable contribution to theological research by the International Marian Mariology Congresses, presided over and organised by Balić, the Holy Office entrusted him with the preparation of the document De Beata, to be presented to the Fathers of the II Vatican Council. During the whole of the council period, Balić showed he was one of the most active and useful experts, cooperating in the redaction of chapter VIII of Lumen Gentium. In 1975, in the Aula Magna of the Antonianum on the occasion of the Mariological Congress, Pope Paul VI thanked and gave homage to Balić for all he had done in the name of the Order for the good of the whole Church.

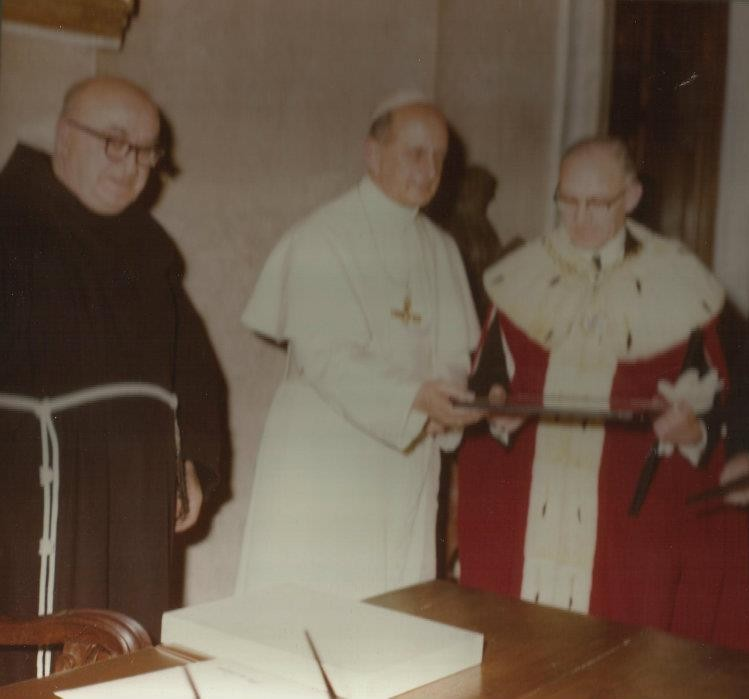
With Paul VI

== Scotistic Congresses ==
Balić has organized the Scotistic Congresses: Rome (1950), Oxford-Edinburgh (1966), Vienna (1970), Padua (1976)

== Influence in the Vatican II ==
Balić served as an expert at the Second Vatican Council. He worked on the editing of the original text of chapter VIII of Lumen gentium that had been prepared by the Holy Office. The editing of the mariological text prepared by the Holy Office that will influence the editing of the chapter VIII of the Lumen gentium has been compiled by Balic.

== Influence on Mariology ==
With Father Gabriel Roschini he was a representative of the “maximalist” school of Marioloy. Balić and Roschini's dream of having the mediation of Mary proclaimed did not attain at the Council. He later recalled of the battle conducted during the Council in defense of the Marian privileges: “It was there that all my work was wrecked”. The attack against the maximalists was the publication of the book La question mariale, by Laurentin, in which the “Marian movement” was presented as “a problem”. Laurentin's book was answered by a great mariologist, the Jesuit Father De Aldama, at the request of Father Balić and Father Roschini, who in turn intervened in the polemics with a booklet called “The so-called Marian question”.

== Notes ==
His remains lie buried inside the Mediatrix of All Graces Church in his native Katuni.

Pope Paul VI «in sign of benevolence and appreciation than he had developed in the Church» wrote from him an autographs Letter Laetifica prorsus.

== Selected publications ==
- Theologiae marianae Ioannis Duns Scoti ad fidem codicum editio, Louvaine 1926.
- Theologiae marianae scholae franciscanae saeculorum XIII et XIV fontes critice stabiliuntur et doctrina exponitur, Louvaine 1927.
- Kroz Marijin perivoj (“Hortus marianus”), Šibenik 1931.
- Joannis de Polliaco et Joannis de Napoli quaestione s disputatae de immaculata Conceptione B. Mariae Virginis, Instituti theologici Makarensis, Sibenici, 1931.
- Ioannis Duns Scoti, Doctoris Subtilis et Mariani, Theologiae Marianae Elementa, Sibenici 1933
- Tractatus de immortalitate B.V. Mariae, Ed. Pontificia Academia Mariana Internationalis, Roma 1948.
- Testimonia de assumptione B.V. Mariae ex omnibus saeculis. Pars prior: ex aetate ante Concilium Tridentinum, Ed. Pontificia Academia Mariana Internationalis, Roma 1948.
- Testimonia de assumptione B.V. Mariae ex omnibus saeculis. Pars altera: ex aetate post Concilium Tridentinum, Ed. Pontificia Academia Mariana Internationalis, Roma 1950

== See also ==
- Rene Laurentin
- Gabriel Roschini
- Pontifical Academy of Mary
- Pontifical Academy
- Mariology
- Roman Catholic Mariology
- Virgin Mary

== Sources and external links ==
- Pontifical Marian Academy.
