= Vassula Rydén =

Christian mystic (born 1942)

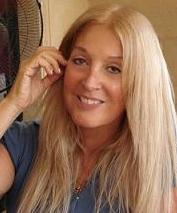
- Born: Vassiliki Claudia Pendakis; January 18, 1942; Cairo, Egypt
- Died: September 25, 2024 (aged 82); Athens, Greece
- Occupation: Christian author
- Children: 2
- Website: www.tlig.org

Vassula Rydén (January 18, 1942 – September 25, 2024) was an author, public speaker, and alleged Christian mystic who lived in Switzerland and on the island of Rhodes, Greece, and claimed to have received messages from Jesus Christ and the Blessed Virgin Mary. Her writings frequently call for people "to repent, love God, and unify the churches." She developed a large following, particularly among Roman Catholics, who came to her lectures purchasing her writings and tapes. She wrote the messages in English, and changed some writings between editions.

In 1995, the Catholic Church's Congregation for the Doctrine of the Faith (CDF), led by Cardinal Joseph Ratzinger, published a Notification (a message from the Holy See) on the writings of Rydén, saying her communications should not be considered supernatural, and calling all Catholic bishops to prevent Rydén's ideas from being spread in their dioceses. In 2007, Cardinal William Levada confirmed that the 1995 Notification was still in effect; he recommended that Catholics should not join prayer groups organized by Rydén. In 2011, the Greek Orthodox Church officially disapproved of Rydén's teachings, instructing their faithful to disassociate from Rydén. In 2012, the Church of Cyprus said that Rydén's teachings were heretical.

== Personal life ==
Rydén was born Vassiliki Claudia Pendakis on January 18, 1942, in Heliopolis on the outskirts of Cairo, Egypt, the daughter of Greek Orthodox parents established in Egypt. Ryden says that from the age of six, she experienced waking dreams and nightmares that she attributed to Satan who was trying to kill her. When she was 10–12 years old, she had waking dreams of a spiritual marriage with Jesus Christ, as Blessed Virgin Mary was looking on.

Rydén started school in Egypt, and then at the age of 15, she emigrated with her family to Europe. She painted and competed in tennis. During her late teens, she said she was surrounded upon occasion by the spirits of dead people, who she said were asking her to help them. None of her childhood or teenage mystical experiences resulted in a personal religious transformation, and Rydén went on to live a fairly secular life indifferent to religion.

In November 1966, she married a Lutheran man in the city of Lausanne, Switzerland, at a Greek Orthodox Church. Her husband was a student who obtained a position with the United Nations after graduation. The couple had two sons together. Because of the husband's job, the family lived in various places in Asia and Africa. From 1966 to 1980, Rydén kept up an active social life. She did not practice any particular religion. The couple was divorced in Sweden in November 1980.

On June 13, 1981, she married her second husband, Per Rydén, a Swedish Lutheran who had been working for the Swedish International Development Cooperation Agency (SIDA) in Mozambique. He took a new position with the Food and Agriculture Organization (FAO) department of the United Nations in Lesotho from 1981 to 1983, then worked again for SIDA from 1984 to 1987 in Bangladesh. Rydén modeled as a hobby, and painted in oils. She also competed in tennis, once winning the women's doubles in a national tournament in Bangladesh. On October 31, 1990, the Rydéns celebrated their existing union in the Greek Orthodox Church in Lausanne. Per Rydén died July 15, 2021.

== Writings ==
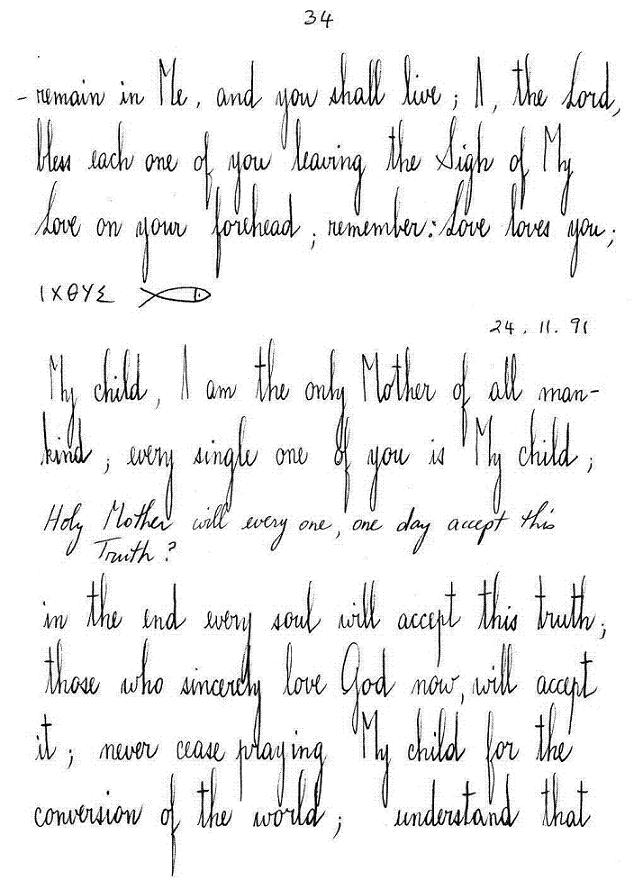
A copy of Rydén's handwritten notes transcribing what she said are messages from Jesus and angels.

In November 1985 when Rydén was living in Bangladesh, she said she experienced an extraordinary sensation when writing a grocery list, a list of cocktail party expenses, or a list of errands. Rydén says she suddenly experienced a light electrical feeling in her right hand and, at the same time, an invisible presence. She was unable to open her hand or lift her arm. She said "an invisible force pushed my hand. I was not afraid, I do not know why." She says she permitted her hand to be guided and that she wrote a line in a very different style from her own with the words: "I am your guardian Angel and my name is Daniel." Rydén says that this guardian Angel prepared her for three months to become a conduit of spiritual messages. After a few weeks of such training, Rydén says she had a vision and message from Jesus Christ.

Rydén also received messages from what she says is the Devil. An evil presence had moved her hand to write, sometimes making her write sensible words. She said that Jesus taught her to discern which spirits were engaging her in the writing of messages, and that the Devil's hand thus became recognizable to her.

After six months of receiving messages, Rydén said she was directed by her guardian angel to find a local American priest named James "Jim" Fannan and tell him about her experiences. First, though, she encountered a German priest named Karl who said she was mentally imbalanced and should consult a doctor. After several more visits from Rydén, Karl summoned Fannan and the two priests watched Rydén at times when she says she received messages. Fannan's initial response was that the messages were not from God but were some evil spirit. Fannan instructed Rydén to refuse the messages. Distraught, Rydén went home and asked her guardian angel for guidance about Fannan; she says that God told her "I will bend him." In early 1987, Fannan told Rydén to speak with the priest Raymond Dujarrier. Preparing to travel to Dujarrier, Rydén says she received an evil message: "A liar was guiding you, collect everything and burn it." Seconds later, Rydén says she felt the presence of God who guided her hand to write: "I will be with you till the end, we are united forever; let My Light shine on you child; I am Yahweh guiding you; glorify Me by loving Me..." Dujarrier assessed the messages as "Divine Revelations of the Heart", and he told Rydén they were given to her to benefit others. After Dujarrier's positive evaluation, Fannan changed his mind and became Rydén's first ardent supporter in the Catholic church. He served as her spiritual adviser, occasionally traveling with her to introduce her to new groups.

In August 1987, Rydén's husband began working for the International Union for Conservation of Nature (IUCN), and the Rydén family moved to Switzerland. Rydén showed her messages to various Roman Catholic and Orthodox priests in Switzerland but met with little support. At Fannan's urging, in June 1988 Rydén visited the city of Medjugorje in Bosnia and Herzegovina, to learn more about Our Lady of Medjugorje—the alleged apparition of the Virgin Mary, which six children there claimed to have received. In November 1988, Rydén was directed by her guardian angel to publish a book of the collected messages, and to conduct prayer meetings once a month. Theologian and sociologist Patrick de Laubier became interested in Rydén's messages, and introduced her to French Mariologist Father René Laurentin in August 1989. Laurentin and Fannan were both in the Marian Movement of Priests, a group of priests who studied modern apparitions of the Blessed Virgin Mary.

Rydén is best known for a collection of nearly 2,000 of these messages published worldwide in many languages as True Life in God. She adhered to the idea that she had been called to transmit to the world the messages she received. However, Rydén never published the first ten months' worth of received messages. In 1993, Laurentin said that Rydén planned to publish the first messages. In 1995, Dominican theologian Father François-Marie Dermine, a Canadian-born priest serving as exorcist for the diocese of Bologna, Italy, wrote that Rydén said that she burned the early messages because there were too many, and they were loose scraps, not bound in a notebook. Dermine says that this destruction of the first messages is suspicious, as there would normally be heightened reverence held for them, if they were messages from angels and Jesus. Rydén wrote in 1995 that she destroyed or discarded the first messages.

Rydén says that prior to writing the messages, she had never studied catechism or theological formation. Rydén believed that God chose her, a "spiritual zero" before the revelations began, so as to leave no doubt that it was His power at work. She stated that: "Jesus wanted a nothing... in order to prove that I have not invented all this and that it comes from Him. He said it in a message: 'All you have comes from Me and is My Work and not yours. Without Me, you are unable to even wink your eyes-so abandon yourself to Me.'"

Rydén's first "handwritten" edition of True Life in God were produced in 1990 by Catholic publisher Editions O.E.I.L. of Paris, with a foreword written by Fannan. In 1991, the organization called Trinitas was formed to typeset Rydén's writings and publish them in many languages. In September 1991, Mariologist Father Philip Pavich was given a copy of Rydén's original messages complete with deletions and modifications showing how Rydén and an editorial assistant had modified the messages for publication. Pavich circulated a critical comparison showing the changes made from the original notebooks to the handwritten edition of True Life in God. Associates of Rydén questioned her; she responded by saying that the deleted text was "taken out with God's guidance." She explained that she keeps two notebooks: a private one filled with original messages, and a public one containing material rewritten from the private notebook. Dermine wrote in 2008 that the deleted material includes failed prophecies, and disappointments in Rydén's life, such as the Virgin Mary telling Rydén in June 1988 that she would arrange a meeting between Rydén and Marian Movement of Priests founder Stefano Gobbi—a meeting that never happened.

Rydén asked American Jesuit Father Mitchell Pacwa to review her messages, so he studied the first five volumes of handwritten messages. Pacwa sent his critique to Father Michael O'Carroll, one of Rydén's spiritual advisors, who said that Pacwa ought to refrain from publishing his findings, and implied divine retribution otherwise. Pacwa had determined that Rydén's own confused interpretation of the Trinity was echoed in the messages she received, showing that it was Rydén making the messages. Pacwa published his criticism in August 1993, arguing that Rydén and her messages both confused the roles of God the Father, God the Son (Jesus), and the Holy Spirit. Rydén had written in her own hand the explanatory note, "Jesus in this whole passage mentions the Father Himself as the Son and the Holy Spirit showing the action and the presence of the Holy Trinity," which Pacwa said demonstrated a "muddled, if not heretical" understanding of the Trinity. Pacwa listed many similar instances in the received messages of the Son and the Father being intermixed and confused in a manner not in keeping with Roman Catholic or Orthodox Catholic teaching. Years later, Dermine described the reaction of O'Carroll as typical of the Rydén organization's response to criticism—a demonization of any who oppose Rydén.

Rydén's messages are believed by her followers to have been prophetic. The Holy See instructs Catholics that the messages should be considered Rydén's personal meditations, and not divine revelations.

=== Handwriting ===
Rydén supporters claim that graphological analysis of the handwriting that Rydén said she produced as dictation shows elements of resisting or being forced and that this is evidence of external spiritual control. In Skeptical Inquirer magazine in 2011, longtime investigator Joe Nickell compared Rydén's "messages" to alleged communications from Jesus to other women claiming revelations and wrote, "the contrived handwriting, the linguistic lapses, and the indications of fantasizing all suggest that Vassula Ryden is not in touch with supernatural entities but is simply engaging in self-deception that in turn deceives the credulous. Her automatic writings therefore are not works of revelation but simply of pious imagination." Nickell says that Rydén's personal misspellings and linguistic errors are identical to those claimed to be written as Jesus, God, Mary, her own invisible "guardian angel, Daniel," and Satan, and all seem to have the same hand writing and grammar. Nickell suggests, "If God deigns to use the English language, should we not expect it to be rendered accurately?" According to Nickell, "One suspects that if Ryden were prevented from seeing what was being written, the entities supposedly guiding her hand would be unable to so faithfully follow the lines! I invite Ryden to accept my invitation to perform a scientific test to refute or confirm this suspicion."

== Other publications ==
Rydén continued to produce new volumes of messages in the series True Life in God; in 2003 she published the 12th volume, containing messages from notebooks 102 to 107. In 1995, she published My Angel Daniel, an account of the early messages. In March 2013, Rydén published Heaven Is Real, But So Is Hell.

== Reception ==
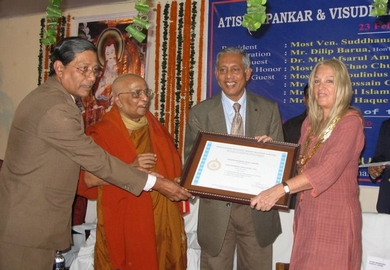
Vassula was awarded the Gold Peace Prize for her efforts to spread peace, unity and interfaith dialogue in the world.

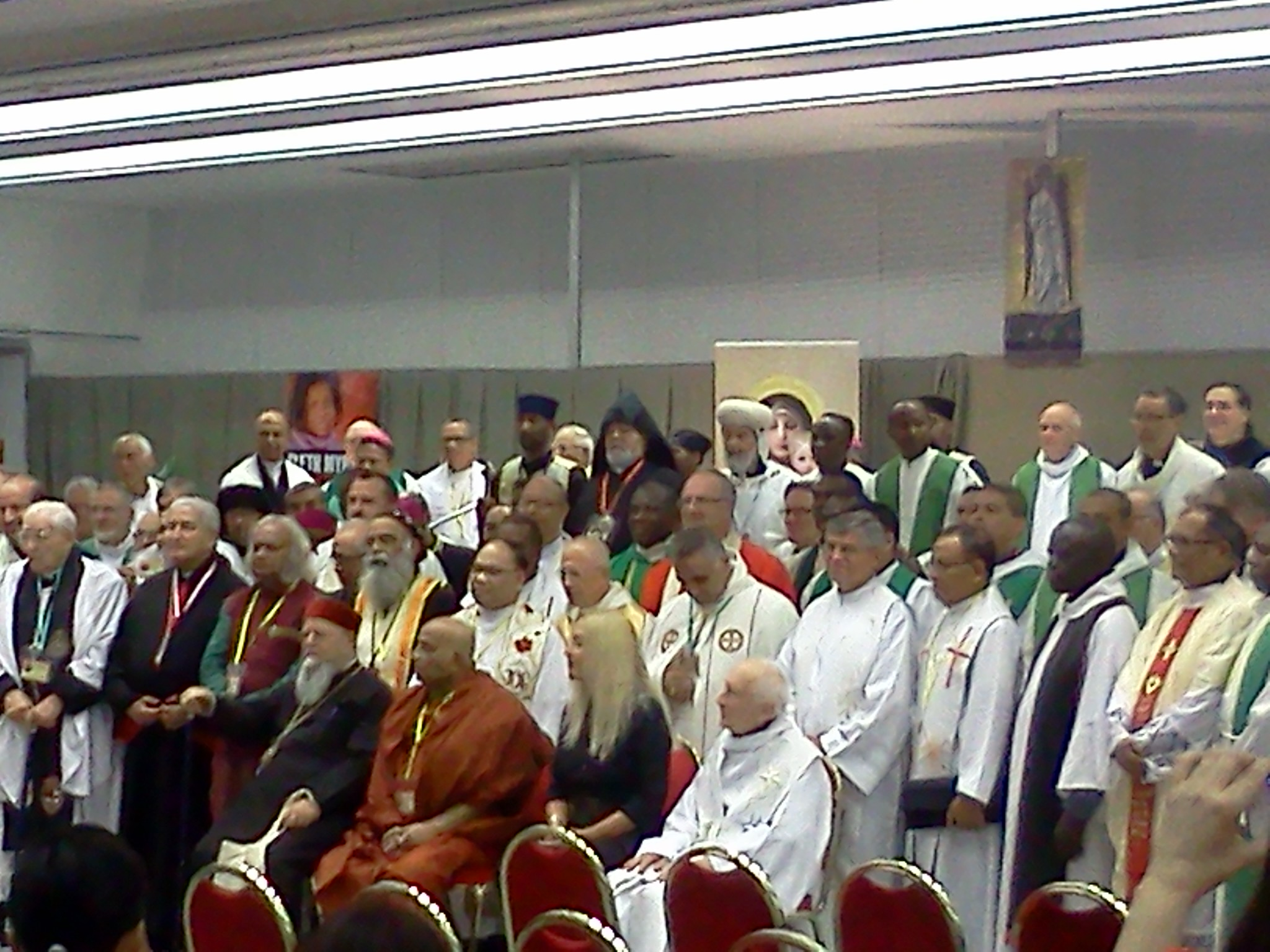
Interfaith meeting promoted by Vassula Rydén (2015)

=== Positive ===
Following Father James Fannan, Fathers Rene Laurentin, Robert Faricy, and Michael O'Carroll as well as Archbishop Frane Franić, who are major promoters of Our Lady of Medjugorje, also actively support Rydén through their public statements and publications. Upon examination of the many objections made against Rydén, Laurentin stated that: "she has excited more opposition than any other."

Supporters Fr. Edward O'Connor and Niels Hvidt believe that God is using Rydén's messages to "consolidate his church" and bring it into unity, which they feel is the main theme of her books.

Other believers such as Fr. Ferdinand Umana Montoya say that Rydén's writings are of supernatural origin of a type that he calls "hieratic" or "sacred" writing.

From 2002 to 2004 a dialogue took place at the request of Cardinal Ratzinger, then prefect of the Congregation for the Doctrine of the Faith. It led to a written exchange of critical questions to which Vassula Rydén answered in writing and then a careful statement to Catholic bishops that Vassula Rydén had provided "useful clarifications regarding her marital situation, as well as some difficulties which in the aforesaid Notification were suggested towards her writings and her participation in the sacraments" (http://www.vassula-cdf.org/clarificationsNU/NUindex.html#13).

Subsequently, on November 28, 2005, Bishop Felix Toppo, S.J., D.D., granted the Nihil Obstat and on November 28, 2005, Archbishop Ramon C. Arguelles, STL, DD, granted the Imprimatur to the TLIG books which indicate that a given book contains nothing that is contrary to Catholic doctrine.

=== Negative ===
==== In the Catholic Church ====
In 1995, Dermine wrote a book, Vassula Rydén: indagine critica (Vassula Rydén: critical inquiry), analyzing Rydén's first six books. Dermine described Rydén's early works as promoting a New Age-type spirituality including millennialism and pan-Christian ecumenicism, preceded by a time in which the antichrist dominated the Church. He said these ideas were heretical to Roman Catholicism, and that Rydén stopped putting them in her writings after warnings from the Church, a factor which demonstrates that they are her own thoughts, not those of spirits. He showed how Rydén's automatic writings were said by her to be from a variety of sources: guardian angels, Jesus, the Virgin Mary, God, and several Christian saints. Dermine noted that Rydén found some of her own messages to be false; she cancelled these ones. He wrote that Rydén explained away the problem by saying that God told her she could change any messages that she felt did not work. Dermine said that the whole body of Rydén's writings could be dismissed on the basis of this supposed revelation. More damning than that was Dermine's assessment that Rydén's automatic writing was directed not by Jesus or God but by the Devil. Dermine wrote that automatic writing has never been part of Christian mysticism and divine revelation, but it has been connected with demonic possession.

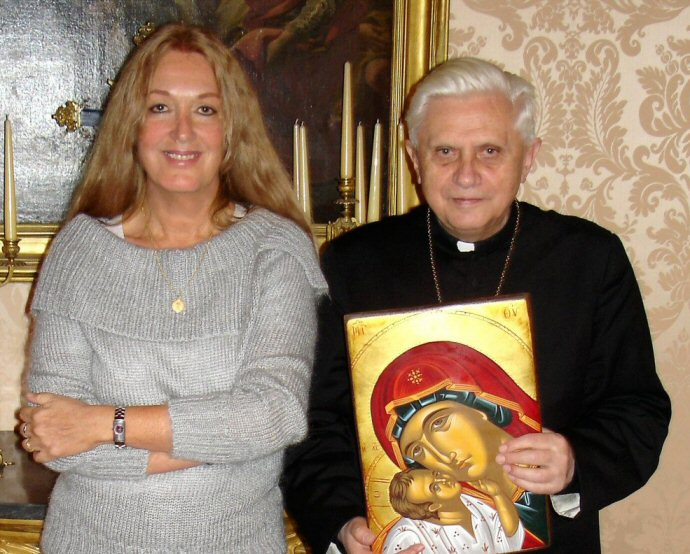
Meeting in 2004 of Vassula Rydén with then-Cardinal Joseph Ratzinger, head of the Vatican's Congregation for the Doctrine of the Faith, which decided against her in 1995

Some skeptics have noted how the revelations have changed with time and have alleged that this was in order to conform more with church doctrine. Dermine compares Rydén's early publications with later versions, noting that the changes made to the messages are one of the main reasons that the messages should be discredited.

In 1995, the Catholic Church's Congregation for the Doctrine of the Faith (CDF) issued a Notification on the writings of Rydén, the Notification was also printed in L'Osservatore Romano, the official Vatican newspaper. The CDF stated that the "attentive examination of the entire question" had brought up "a number of basic elements that must be considered negative in the light of Catholic doctrine" as well as "several doctrinal errors". It also questioned the "suspect nature of the ways in which these alleged revelations have occurred" and considers the fact that "the aforementioned errors no longer appear in Ryden's later writings is a sign that the alleged heavenly messages are merely the result of private meditations". The Notification concludes by requesting "the intervention of the Bishops" to prevent the dissemination of Ryden's ideas in their dioceses and "invites all the faithful not to regard Mrs Vassula Ryden's writings and speeches as supernatural".

In 1996, Belgian theologian Joseph Moerman criticized an attack made by Laurentin on those who had been speaking out against Rydén. Moerman said that Laurentin's defense of Rydén included unwarranted caricaturization of CDF leaders, and unsupported positive analysis of her writings. Moerman said that Rydén's writings could not be directly from Jesus because of inconsistencies within them, and because of differences between the style of known mystics writing in a state of religious ecstasy and Rydén's writings performed in "normal lucidity".

In November 1996, the CDF issued a press release, stating that the Notification "retains all its force" and "was approved by the competent authorities and will be published in the Acta Apostolicae Sedis, the official organ of the Holy See". It instructed Catholics "not to regard the messages of Vassula Ryden as divine revelations, but only as her personal meditations".

In 1999, the Argentine organization Servicio Para el Esclarecimiento en Sectas (Foundation S.P.E.S.), formed to investigate new religious movements and sects, published a two-part bulletin critical of Rydén and her followers, authored by Mónica de López Roda. De López Roda described how Rydén's mission appeared to be the unification of all Christian churches under a non-hierarchical ecumenicism; a spiritual Christianity devoid of doctrinal differences. She said that the positive words from Rydén provoked division among Christians because of questions about whether the messages were fake. De López Roda named supporters such as Archbishop Emmanuel Milingo and Father René Laurentin who reportedly questioned the directives of the 1995 Notification by the Holy See.

In September 2005, the spokesman for the Catholic Church in Scotland warned people against going to Rydén's conference in Edinburgh. Referring to the 1995 Notification, he said Rydén "certainly did not" operate with the approval of the Church and that "the advice to Catholics is not to attend her gatherings due to the suspect nature of her alleged revelations, which contain doctrinal errors."

In January 2006, Roger Mahony, the Archbishop of Los Angeles, California, approved the withdrawal of an invitation to host to a conference at the Cathedral of Our Lady of the Angels at which the main speaker was to be Rydén. Mgr. Kostelnik, pastor of the cathedral, explained in a press release that the organizers had assured him that Rydén's writings had "been cleared by the Vatican", but that he had discovered that those assurances were "a serious misrepresentation of the current Vatican view of Mrs Ryden's speeches and writings" and that the 1995 and 1996 Vatican statements cautioning Catholics against following Rydén remained "in full force".

Cardinal Prosper Grech said he communicated to Rydén in the name of the Congregation for the Doctrine of the faith in some period after 1997. He had thought the CDF was satisfied, but in a letter dated January 25, 2007, the new Prefect of the Congregation for the Doctrine of the Faith, Cardinal William Levada, following continued requests for clarifications on the writings and activities of Rydén, wrote to the Catholic hierarchy around the world stating that "the Notification of 1995 remains valid as a doctrinal judgment" of the writings, which should be seen as her own personal meditations and that Catholics should not take part in prayer groups established by Rydén.

Vassula's autobiographic book Heaven is Real But So is Hell was reviewed by Cardinal Grech

Cardinal Grech reviewed Heaven is Real But So is Hell: An Eyewitness Account of What is to Come in 2014 and said it was an autobiography and apologia in the apocalyptic genre. Grech said that he does not know the origin of Rydén's visions but that if they bring more people to God then "there is no reason to reject them outright."

==== In the Orthodox Church ====
On March 16, 2011, the Greek Orthodox Church and synod of the Ecumenical Patriarchate of Constantinople issued a disapproval of her teachings and instructed all Orthodox Christians not to associate with her. The Ecumenical Patriarchate "denounce[d] from the Mother Church" Rydén and her organization, "True Life In God", and refused "ecclesiastical communion" to those involved. The Synodical Committee for Matters of Heresy of the Church of Cyprus announced on January 13, 2012, that Rydén's "teachings are heretical, and her claims that she communicates directly with Christ are fantastical and outside of the spirit of the experience of our Church."

== Lawsuit against critical website ==
In 2002, Maria Laura Pio, a former follower of Rydén's teachings, published a website critical of Rydén. The website hosted a collection of documents and interviews that were critical of Rydén's teachings. Niels Christian Hvidt cited the website in his book Christian Prophecy: The Post-Biblical Tradition. In May 2012 the website was closed because of the threat of legal action from Rydén's attorneys, who argued that the term "Vassula" was trademarked, that a website named "infovassula" must belong to Rydén. Pio announced on 3 May 2012, "I am going to close the website at the end of May and unfortunately, since I do not have the means financially nor mentally to face another lawsuit, no matter how ridiculous it is, I am constrained to hand over the domain name to Vassula in June 2012." In 2013, the Catholic research group GRIS obtained permission from Pio to remount the critical website under a new domain: www.pseudomystica.info.

== Activities ==
In 1998, Rydén's True Life In God Foundation initiated the Beth Myriam (Mary's House) project to feed the poor.

Rydén has made speaking appearances in a Buddhist Temple in Hiroshima, Japan in 1999, in Benin, Africa in 2000, and at a Christian Unity conference "United in Christ" at Namur, Belgium in 2009.
