= Pontifical Academy of Mary =

Pontifical academy in Vatican City

- Latin: Pontificia Academia Mariana Internationalis
- Type: Pontifical academy
- Established: 1959
- Rector: Stefano Maria Cecchin
- Location: Vatican City
- Website: www.pami.info

The Pontifical Academy of Mary (Latin: Pontificia Academia Mariana Internationalis, Italian: Pontificia accademia mariana internazionale, PAMI) is an international pontifical organization tasked with promoting mariology. The academy is one of the Pontifical academies at the Vatican in Rome. The PAMI also has the task of coordinating the other Marian academies and societies that exist worldwide and of exercising vigilance against any Marian excess or minimalism. For this purpose the Pope directed that the Academy have a council that examines the organization of congresses, and that coordinates Mariological societies and those who promote or teach mariology.

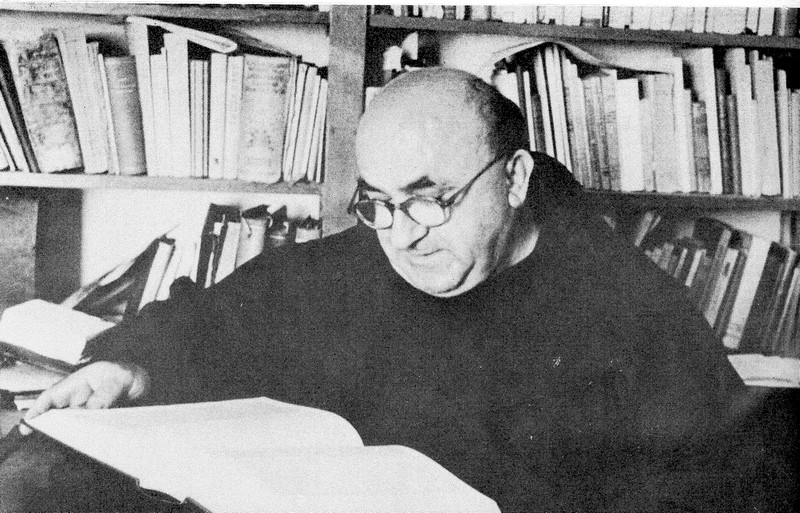
Carlo Balic

== History ==
The Academy was established in July 1946 by the Order of Friars Minor with the specific task of organising scientific debates and conferences and caring for the publication of the Bibliotheca Mariana. It was also responsible for studies relating to the dogma of the Immaculate Conception, on its first centenary. The first president of the Commission was Friar Charles Balic, who directed the Chair of Marian Studies at the Pontifical Atheneum Antonianum.

On December 8, 1959, Pope John XXIII, with the motu proprio Maiora in dies gave the Academy the title of “Pontifical”. In this way he instituted in it the permanent Committee charged with organizing the celebration of International Mariological and Marian Congresses. Said Committee, with the Statutes approved by Pope John Paul II, is the Council of the Academy.

With Pope Francis' reorganization of the Roman Curia as of 5 June 2022 as provided for in the apostolic constitution Praedicate evangelium, the new Dicastery for Culture and Education became responsible for coordinating the work of this Academy with its own work and that of a number of other bodies.

== Activities ==
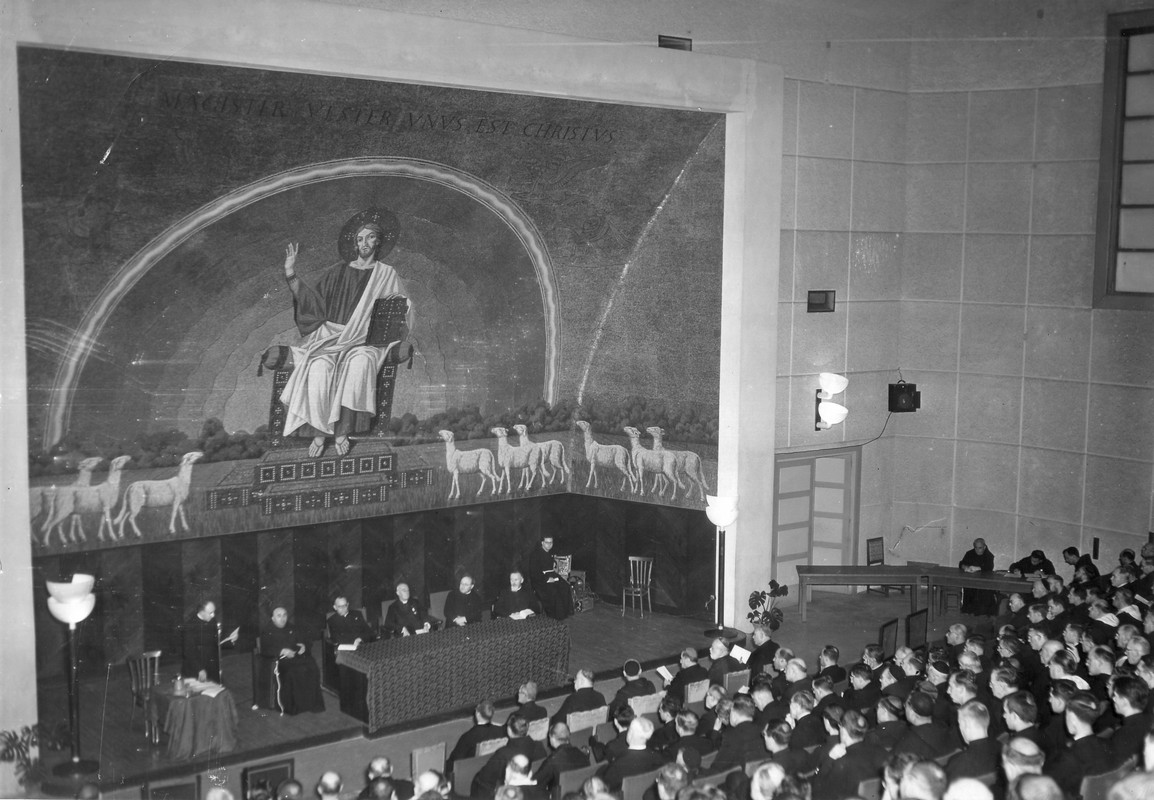
Rome 1950

In 1950 the Academy gained international recognition with the organisation of the first International Mariological Congress and the eighth International Marian Congress. Congresses in 1948 and 1958 followed. The 23rd International Congress was held on September 4–9, 2012, and emphasized developments and new perspectives in contemporary Roman Catholic mariology (since Vatican Council II, after which it declined, and then was revived starting with the pontificate of Pope Paul VI).

The work of PAMI has a twofold purpose: to promote and favor the scientific studies of the Virgin Mary, be they speculative or historical-critical, and to organize periodic Marian Conventions and Conferences. The results of which are edited and published in mariological collections, both historical and theological.

It is the will of the Papacy that it be an International, yet centralized body for the coordination of Mariological work in various nations and in the single scientific entities. This task of coordination was highlighted by the pontifical document of Pope John XXIII: “It is our desire that this our Academy continue, as it has up till now, to work for the friendly union of forces and intent of all other Marian Academies and Societies existing in the world so as to contribute to the praise and honor of the Virgin Mary.”

The PAMI also coordinates the teachers of mariology for which it organizes periodic meetings.

== Marian societies and academies ==
- Société Française d’Études Mariales (SFEM – Francia)
- Sociedad Mariológica Española (SME – Spagna)
- Mariological Society of America (USA)
- Deutsche Arbeitsgemeinschaft für Mariologie (Germania)
- Sociedad Mariológica Colombiana
- Polskie Towarzystwo Mariologiczne (Polonia)
- Hrvatski Mariološki Institut (Croazia)
- Associazione Mariologica Interdisciplinare Italiana (AMI)
- Ecumenical Society of the Blessed Virgin Mary (ESBVM – Inghilterra-Usa)
- Società Mariologica Mediorientale (Libano)
- Mariological Academy of India (India)
- Mariological Society of Philippines

Other Marian sections:

- Asiatic Section
- African Section
- Latin-American Section
- Slovenia Section
- Brazilian Section

== Marian centres ==
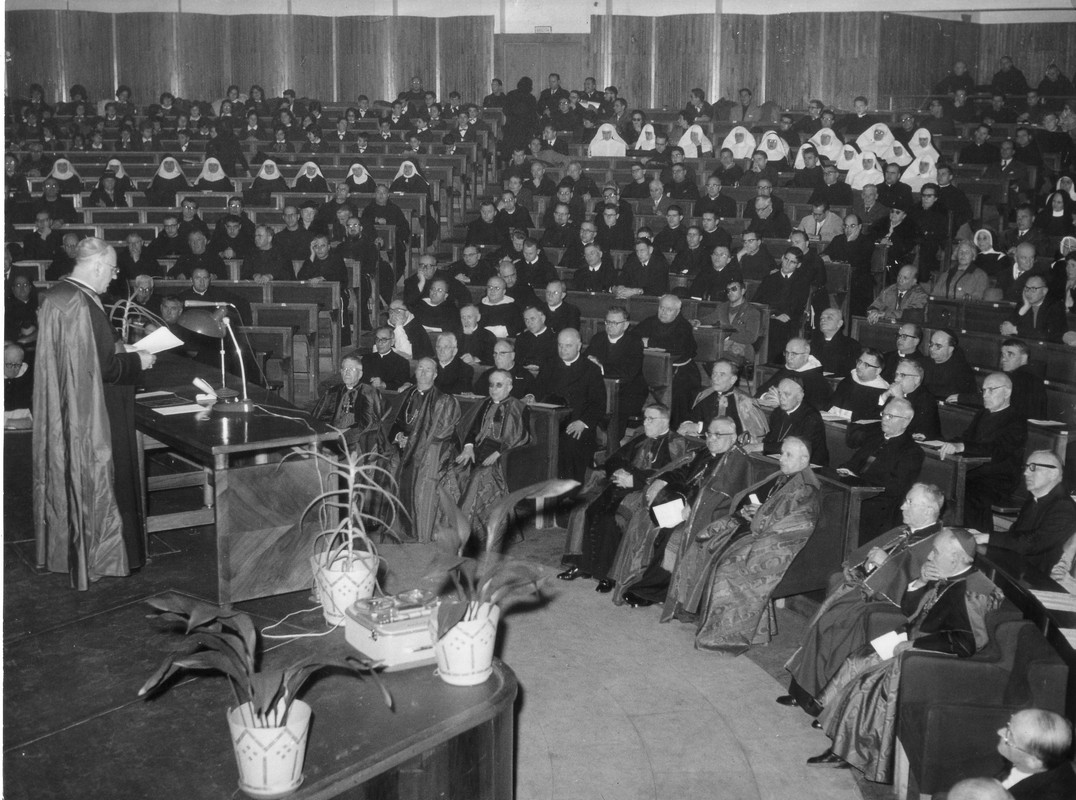
Rome 1954

- Pontifical Theological Faculty Marianum (Rome)
- International Marian Research Institute (Dayton – USA)
- Marian Academy of Kolbe (Kolbianum) in Niepokalanow (Poland)
- Istituto Superiore di Scienze Religiose S. Maria di Monte Berico (Vicenza – Italy)
- Centro mariano de los Siervos de Maria (Mexico)
- Centrum Formacji Maryjnej “Salvatoris Mater” Księży Marianów (Poland)
- Academia Marial de Aparecida (Brasil)
- Marian Centre of Our Lady Ta’ Pinu Shrine (Gozo, Malta)

== Mariological/Marian international congresses ==
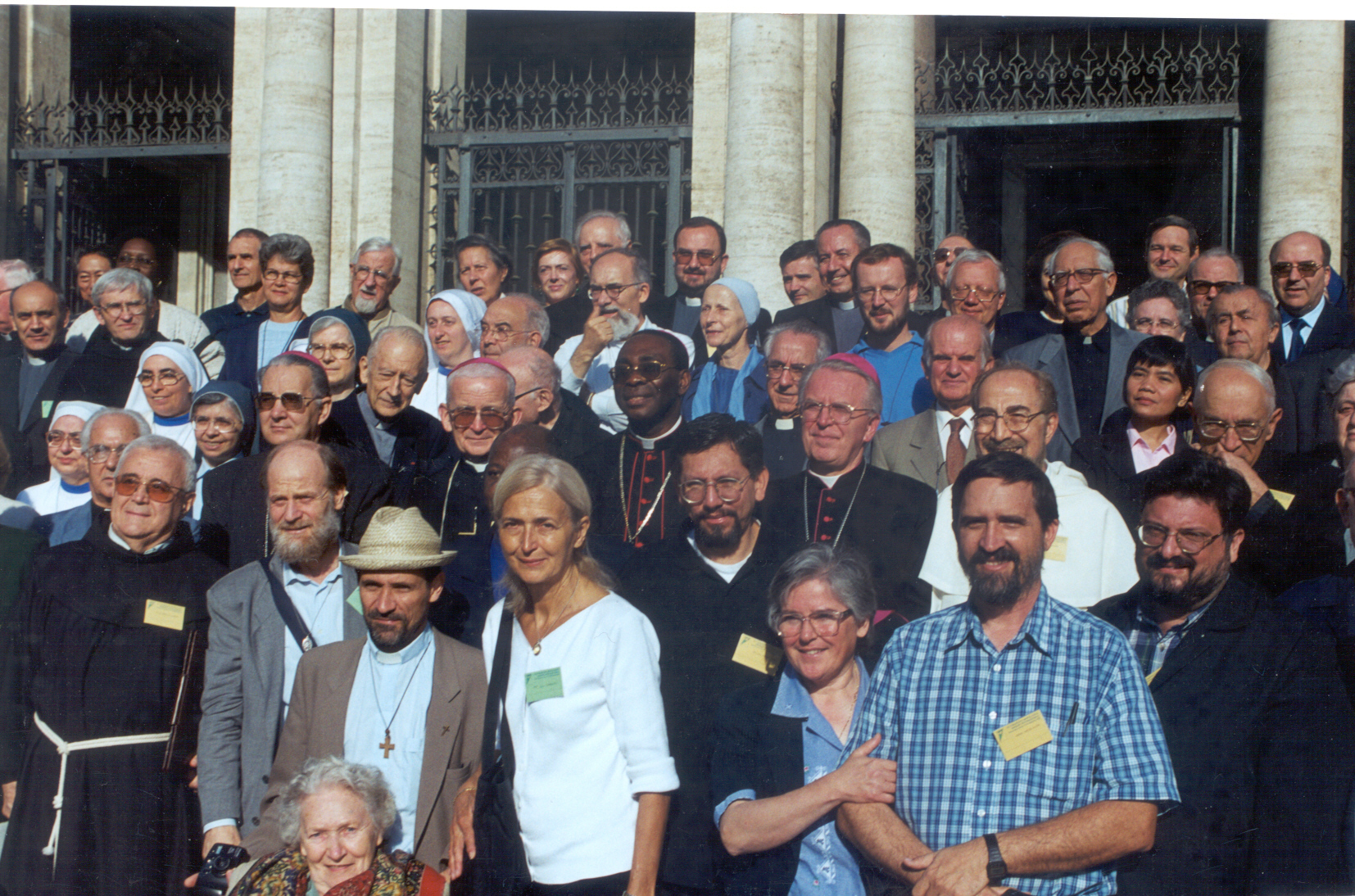
Rome 2000

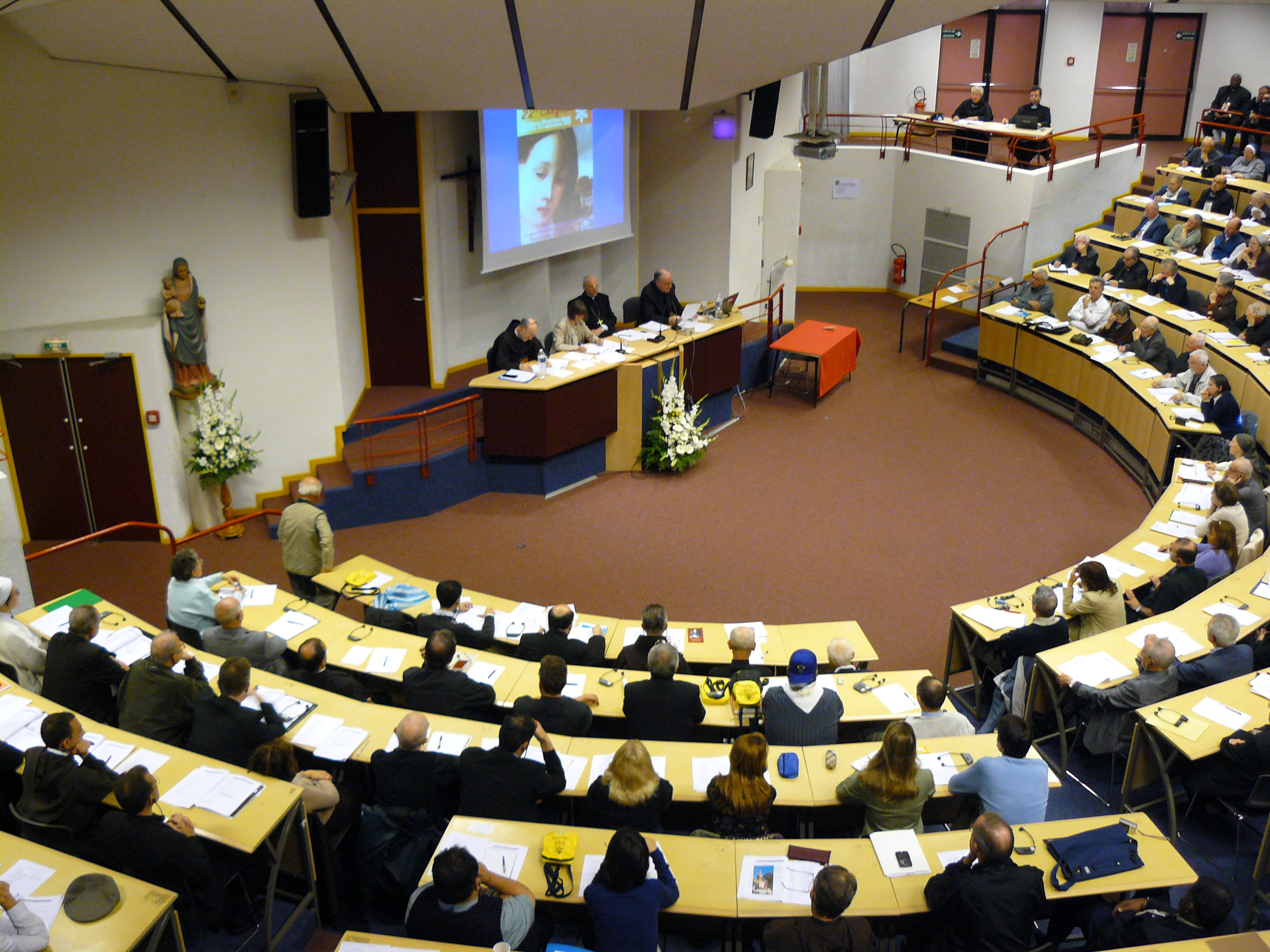
Lourdes 2008

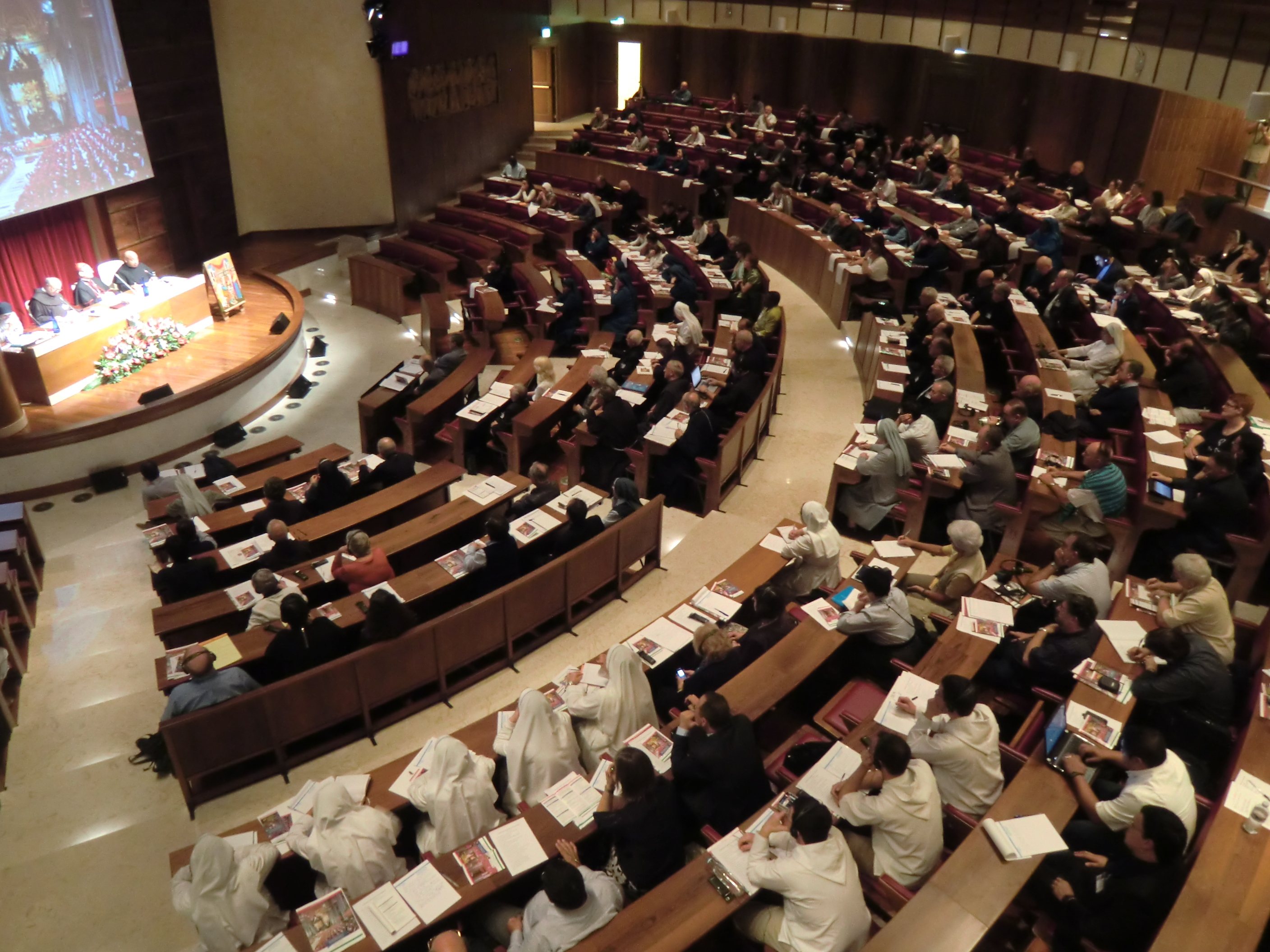
Congress 2012

The PAMI has organized "Mariological International Congresses" since 1950, the occasion of the 8th Marian International Congress:

1950 – 1º Mariological – 8º Marian International Congress – Rome
1954 – 2º Mariological – 9º Marian International Congress – Rome
1958 – 3º Mariological – 10º Marian International Congress – Lourdes
1965 – 4º Mariological – 11º Marian International Congress – Santo Domingo
1967 – 5º Mariological – 12º Marian International Congress – Lisboa
1971 – 6º Mariological – 13º Marian International Congress – Zagreb
1975 – 7º Mariological – 14º Marian International Congress – Rome
1979 – 8º Mariological – 15º Marian International Congress – Zaragoza
1983 – 9º Mariological – 16º Marian International Congress – Malta
1987 – 10º Mariological – 17º Marian International Congress – Kevelaer
1992 – 11º Mariological – 18º Marian International Congress – Huelva
1996 – 12º Mariological – 19º Marian International Congress – Częstochowa

On January 8, 1996, John Paul II approved the revision of the statutes of the PAMI, leading to a change in the denomination of the congresses since 2000.

2000 – 20º Mariological Marian International Congress – Rome
2004 – 21º Mariological Marian International Congress – Rome
2008 – 22º Mariological Marian International Congress – Lourdes
2012 – 23º Mariological Marian International Congress – Rome
2016 – 24º Mariological Marian International Congress – Fátima

== See also ==
- Global organisation of the Catholic Church
- Index of Vatican City-related articles
- Mariology
- Roman Catholic Mariology
- Virgin Mary
- The Pontifical Theological Faculty Marianum.
