= Marianum =

Pontifical institute

Coordinates: 41°53′11″N 12°27′49″E

The Marianum is a pontifical institute in Rome, Italy founded by Gabriel Roschini for the study of Mariology.

== History ==
=== Background ===
The name Marianum itself goes back to Pope Boniface IX, who in 1398 granted the Servites the right to confer theological degrees. This college in Rome was closed in 1870 by the victorious Italian government, which took over the Papal States, Rome and many papal institutions. It opened again under the name Sant' Alessio Falconieri in 1895.

=== Present institute ===
In 1939, Servite priest Gabriel Roschini founded the journal Marianum and directed it for thirty years. In 1950, he also founded the Marianum Theological Faculty, which, on December 8, 1955, became a pontifical faculty by decree Coelesti Honorandae Reginae of the Sacred Congregation of Seminaries and Universities under the authority of Pope Pius XII. Roschini served as the rector. Since 1971, the pontifical institute has been open to lay persons.

== Academics ==
The Marianum offers both a master's degree in Mariology (2-year academic program) and a doctorate in Mariology. This Mariological facility has a library with more than 85,000 volumes on Mariology and a number of magazines and journals that treat of theological and Mariological topics.

== Notable alumni ==
- Ngô Đình Lệ Quyên - served as Commissioner of Immigration for the city of Rome.

== See also ==
- Pontifical Academy of Mary
