= Cecilia Eusepi =

Italian Roman Catholic

Blessed Cecilia Eusepi
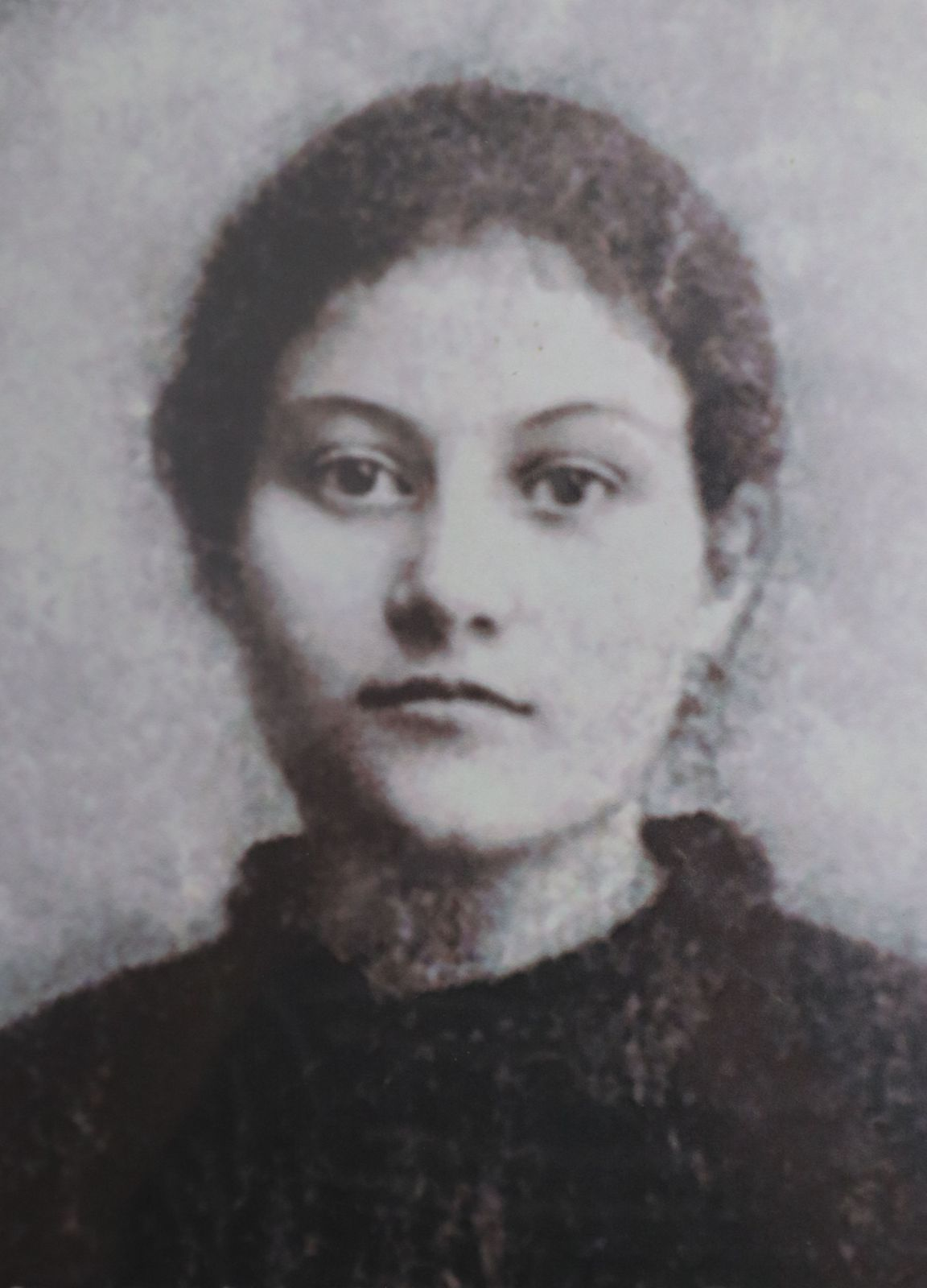
- Born: 17 February 1910; Monte Romano, Viterbo, Kingdom of Italy
- Died: 1 October 1928 (aged 18); Nepi, Viterbo, Kingdom of Italy
- Venerated in: Roman Catholic Church
- Beatified: 17 June 2012, Piazza della Bottata, Nepi, Italy by Cardinal Angelo Amato
- Feast: 1 October

Cecilia Eusepi (17 February 1910 – 1 October 1928) was an Italian Roman Catholic and a professed member from the Secular Servites. Since an early age she had desired to become a nun, but did not manage to do due to a severe case of tuberculosis which confined her to her bed.

In 1926 she met the young priest Gabriel Roschini who had recently arrived at Nepi, south or Rome, where Eusepi lived with her family. Roschini advised her to write a journal of her thoughts and prayers. She titled her journal Storia di un Pagliaccio ("Story of a Clown"), because she considered herself to be a "little clown" and "a half-stupid clown good for nothing"; she wrote that it must be her extreme weakness that appealed to God.

Eusepi died in 1928 of tuberculosis at age 18. In 1931 Roschini published a book titled "The Story of a Lilly" about her life. The title reflected the fact that Eusepi had desired to be like a lily in imitation of the life of the Virgin Mary. In 1946 Eusepi's writings were reviewed by the Vatican authorities and found to be in conformance to Catholic teachings.

Eusepi's beatification was celebrated in Nepi on 17, June 2012 and her case was mentioned by Pope Benedict XVI during his Angelus talk at the Vatican that day.

== Life ==
Cecilia Eusepi was born in Monte Romano on 17 February 1910. She was the last of eleven children to Paulina Mannucci; her brother Vincenzo was called for service during World War I. Eusepi received her baptism on 26 February from the archpriest Ugo Fulignoli. Her father died in April 1910 after ill health and on his deathbed entrusted his widow and children to his brother-in-law Filippo Mannucci. On 6 January 1915 she was taken to a small farm called "La Massa" just off from Nepi with her mother and siblings in the care of her maternal uncle. She received her Confirmation on 27 May 1917 from Bishop Luigi Olivares and her First Communion on 2 October 1917.

Eusepi was sent to a convent school (close to a Servite convent) on 5 September 1916 and later in 1922 she joined the Servite Order as a secular member. The Cistercian nuns oversaw her education while at this convent school from 1916 until 1923 and in 1922 she became part of Catholic Action. On 14 February 1922 she received the scapular at the San Tolomeo ai Servi church and assumed the name of "Maria Angela". In 1923 she received permission from the local bishop to join the order as a postulant despite her uncle and mother's objections. Eusepi studied in Rome as well as in Pistoia and Zara. From 1923 to 1926 she was among the Servite nuns in Pistoia but had to leave and go home due to tuberculosis which she was diagnosed with in summer 1926. The girl had also hoped to join the missions but her poor health prevented her from doing so and she returned home to Nepi on 23 October 1926.

During her final illness her religious practice was a comfort to members of the Catholic Action movement as well as seminarians and priests often visited her and sometimes asked her for her opinion on their homilies and other things. It was then that she met the Servite priest Gabriele M. Roschini who became her confessor and spiritual director and who instructed her to keep a journal; she started this on 29 May 1927 and ended entries on 12 September 1928 weeks before her death.

Eusepi died from tuberculosis on the night of 1 October 1928, reportedly singing songs to the Madonna on the date that she had predicted she would die after having a dream about Thérèse of Lisieux. On 16 March 1944 her remains were relocated to the San Tolmeo ai Servi church.

== Beatification ==
The beatification process commenced in an informative process in Civita Castellana from 1939 until 1942. Theologians approved to her journal and other spiritual writings as being in accord with the Catholic faith on 22 November 1946. The cause started on a formal level under Pope Pius XII on 23 January 1954 and she became titled as a Servant of God. An apostolic process was held from 1958 to 1963 and the Congregation for Rites validated both processes on 12 July 1963; the Congregation for the Causes of Saints received the Positio in 1977. Theologians approved the cause on 24 February 1987 as did the C.C.S. on 12 May 1987. The confirmation of her heroic virtue led to Pope John Paul II titling her as Venerable on 1 June 1987.

The miracle for her beatification concerned the 4 August 1959 cure of Tommaso Ricci who survived what would have been a fatal traffic accident. This was investigated in a diocesan process and received C.C.S. validation on 10 March 2006; a medical board approved it on 1 October 2009 as did theologians on 12 December 2009 and the C.C.S. on 4 May 2010. Pope Benedict XVI approved this on 1 July 2010 and Cardinal Angelo Amato presided on the pope's behalf on 17 June 2012 in Nepi.

The current postulator for this cause is the Servite priest Franco M. Azzalli.
