= Revelation in Mormonism =

Latter Day Saints doctrine

In Mormonism, revelation is communication from God to man. Latter Day Saints teach that the Latter Day Saint movement began with a revelation from God, which began a process of restoring the gospel of Jesus Christ to the earth. Latter Day Saints also teach that revelation is the foundation of the church established by Jesus Christ and that it remains an essential element of his true church today. Continuous revelation provides individual Latter Day Saints with a "testimony", described by Richard Bushman as "one of the most potent words in the Mormon lexicon".

In response to an inquiry on the beliefs of the church, Joseph Smith wrote what came to be called the Wentworth Letter, the last section of which was canonized as the Articles of Faith. The fifth, sixth, seventh and ninth articles state the essence of Latter Day Saint belief concerning revelation:

5 We believe that a man must be called of God, by prophecy, and by the laying on of hands by those who are in authority, to preach the Gospel and administer in the ordinances thereof.
6 We believe in the same organization that existed in the Primitive Church, namely, apostles, prophets, pastors, teachers, evangelists, and so forth.
7 We believe in the gift of tongues, prophecy, revelation, visions, healing, interpretation of tongues, and so forth.
9 We believe all that God has revealed, all that He does now reveal, and we believe that He will yet reveal many great and important things pertaining to the Kingdom of God.

Most Latter Day Saint denominations believe that the Lord "will yet reveal many great and important things" to his church through modern apostles and prophets; some go as far as to claim that all leaders of their churches are "called of God, by prophecy"; and that each member of the church can receive personal revelation to strengthen their faith and guide them in their own lives.

== Doctrine ==
The Latter Day Saint concept of revelation includes the belief that revelation from God is available to all those who earnestly seek it with the intent of doing good.

The Church of Jesus Christ of Latter-day Saints (LDS Church) and some other Latter Day Saint denominations claim to be led by revelation from God to a living prophet, who receives God's word just as Abraham, Moses, Peter, and other ancient prophets and apostles did. It also teaches that everyone is entitled to personal revelation with respect to his or her stewardship. Thus, parents can receive revelation in raising their families, individuals can receive revelation to help them meet personal challenges, church officers may receive revelation for those whom they serve, and apostles and prophets may receive revelation for the entire church. The important consequence of this is that each person may receive confirmation that particular doctrines taught by a prophet are true, as well as gain divine insight in using those truths for their own benefit and eternal progress. In the LDS Church, personal revelation is expected and encouraged, and many converts believe that personal revelation from God was instrumental in their conversion.

Joseph F. Smith, the sixth president and prophet of the LDS Church, summarized the church's belief concerning revelation by saying, "We believe ... in the principle of direct revelation from God to man."

Smith also more specifically detailed the importance of the principle of modern-day revelation to the church he then led:

"The gospel cannot be administered, nor the Church of God continue to exist, without it. Christ is the head of his Church and not man, and the connection can only be maintained upon the principle of direct and continued revelation. It… is a living, vital principle to be enjoyed on certain conditions only, namely – through absolute faith in God and obedience to his laws and commandments. The moment this principle is cut off, that moment the Church is adrift, being severed from its ever-living head. In this condition it cannot continue, but must cease to be the Church of God and, like the ship at sea without captain, compass or rudder, is afloat at the mercy of the storms and the waves of ever contending human passions, and worldly interests, pride and folly..." (Smith, 362)

James E. Talmage, a member of the Quorum of the Twelve Apostles, attempted to connect this belief with the nature of God and also emphasized the importance of the principle of continuing revelation to his faith:

"It is at once unreasonable, and directly contrary to our conception of the unchangeable justice of God, to believe that He will bless the Church in one dispensation with present living revelation of His will and in another leave [his] Church ... to live as best it may according to the laws of a bygone age."

Community of Christ has added a number of revelations to their canon from the president of their church. Other Latter Day Saint denominations have also added new scriptures. There is no one accepted way among Latter Day Saints as to where or how revelations should be received.

Latter Day Saints believe that God answers prayers. Communicating with God is seen by many Latter Day Saints as an important part of developing faith and coming to know God, resulting ultimately in exaltation if the person remains faithful to covenants with Jesus Christ.

=== Apostolic revelation ===
Latter Day Saints believe that the need for guidance by apostolic revelation in Jesus Christ's church is as great today as it was when Peter, Paul, and other apostles wrote the letters that eventually became the New Testament.

"Surely the Lord GOD will do nothing, but he revealeth his secret unto his servants the prophets."

James E. Faust, a member of the Quorum of the Twelve Apostles, spoke on the need for continual divine guidance of Jesus Christ's church in both doctrinal and administrative matters:

"Much revelation received, in this time as well as anciently, has been doctrinal. Some of it has been operational and tactical. Much of it is not spectacular. President John Taylor reminds us:

"'Adam’s revelation did not instruct Noah to build his ark; nor did Noah’s revelation tell Lot to forsake Sodom; nor did either of these speak of the departure of the children of Israel from Egypt. These all had revelations for themselves.'

"In our time God has revealed how to administer the Church with a membership of over six million differently than when there were just six members of the Church. These differences include the use of modern technology, such as films, computers, and satellite broadcasts, to teach and communicate new ways to conduct missionary work in various nations; the location and building of temples; and many others."

LDS Church president Gordon B. Hinckley further explained:

"A growing church, a church that is spreading across the earth in these complex times, needs constant revelation from the throne of heaven to guide it and move it forward.

"With prayer and anxious seeking of the will of the Lord, we testify that direction is received, that revelation comes, and that the Lord blesses His Church as it moves on its path of destiny.

"On the solid foundation of the Prophet Joseph's divine calling and the revelations of God, which came through him, we go forward. Much has been accomplished in bringing us to this present day. But there is much more to be done in the process of taking this restored gospel to "every nation, and kindred, and tongue, and people"."

=== Inspired vs. infallible ===
The LDS Church believes apostolic revelation to be inspired, but not infallible. One leader wrote, "We consider God, and him alone, infallible; therefore his revealed word to us cannot be doubted, though we may be in doubt some times about the knowledge which we obtain from human sources, and occasionally be obliged to admit that something which we had considered to be a fact, was really only a theory." Leaders are still considered regular people with "their opinions and prejudices and are left to work out their own problems without inspiration in many instances." Brigham Young taught "the greatest fear I have is that the people of this Church will accept what we say as the will of the Lord without first praying about it and getting the witness within their own hearts that what we say is the word of the Lord." Members are taught to rely on the Holy Ghost to judge, and if a revelation is in harmony with the revealed word of God, it should be accepted.

Dallin H. Oaks explains: "Revelations from God ... are not constant. We believe in continuing revelation, not continuous revelation. We are often left to work out problems without the dictation or specific direction of the Spirit." Thus, the current prophet can clarify, correct or change any previous teachings.

However, once a doctrine has been accepted by the church by "common consent", it becomes part of the standard works, and then takes precedence over any other revelation. Members of the LDS church only consider themselves bound by doctrine found in the standard works. Also, though it is not considered scripture, Latter-day Saints also believe the United States Constitution to be a divinely inspired document.

=== Called of God, by prophecy ===
Latter Day Saints believe that all who serve in any position in the church, from apostles who lead the entire church to deacons who pass the sacrament, must be "called of God, by prophecy, and by the laying on of hands by those who are in authority". This requirement applies to both hierarchical priesthood leadership callings (such as bishop), as well as other priesthood and non-priesthood callings (such as Sunday school instructor, organist, etc.).

"And Joshua the son of Nun was full of the spirit of wisdom; for Moses had laid his hands upon him: and the children of Israel hearkened unto him, and did as the LORD commanded Moses."

"And God hath set some in the church, first apostles, secondarily prophets, thirdly teachers, after that miracles, then gifts of healings, helps, governments, diversities of tongues."

Henry B. Eyring, a member of the Quorum of the Twelve Apostles, gave the following counsel to those called to serve. This counsel illustrates many key LDS beliefs concerning those "called of God, by prophecy",

"And so, to everyone, man or woman, girl or boy, who has been called or who will yet be, I give you my counsel.

"First, you are called of God. The Lord knows you. He knows whom He would have serve in every position in His Church. He chose you. He has prepared a way so that He could issue your call. He restored the keys of the priesthood to Joseph Smith. Those keys have been passed down in an unbroken line to President Hinckley. Through those keys, other priesthood servants were given keys to preside in stakes and wards, in districts and branches. It was through those keys that the Lord called you.

"Your call is an example of a source of power unique to the Lord’s Church. Men and women are called of God by prophecy and by the laying on of hands by those God has authorized.

"You are called to represent the Savior. Your voice to testify becomes the same as His voice, your hands to lift the same as His hands.

"You see, there are no small callings to represent the Lord. Your call carries grave responsibility. But you need not fear, because with your call come great promises.

"One of those promises is the second thing you need to know. It is that the Lord will guide you by revelation just as He called you. You must ask in faith for revelation to know what you are to do. With your call comes the promise that answers will come.

"There is a third thing you need to know: Just as God called you and will guide you, He will magnify you. You will need that magnification. Your calling will surely bring opposition. The Apostle Paul described it this way: "For we wrestle not against flesh and blood, but against principalities, against powers, against the rulers of the darkness of this world."

"One of the ways you will be attacked is with the feeling that you are inadequate. Well, you are inadequate to answer a call to represent God with only your own powers. But you have access to more than your natural capacities, and you do not work alone.

"The Lord will magnify what you say and what you do in the eyes of the people you serve. He will send the Holy Ghost to manifest to them that what you spoke was true. What you say and do will carry hope and give direction to people far beyond your natural abilities and your own understanding. That miracle has been a mark of the Lord’s Church in every dispensation."

=== Personal revelation ===
While teaching the importance of studying the words of both ancient and modern prophets, Latter Day Saints also emphasize the necessity of personal revelation from God by the power of the Holy Ghost as the only pathway to true knowledge of Jesus Christ:

"But the Comforter, which is the Holy Ghost, whom the Father will send in my name, he shall teach you all things, and bring all things to your remembrance, whatsoever I have said unto you."

"He saith unto them, But whom say ye that I am? And Simon Peter answered and said, Thou art the Christ, the Son of the living God. And Jesus answered and said unto him, Blessed art thou, Simon Bar-jona: for flesh and blood hath not revealed it unto thee, but my Father which is in heaven."

Boyd K. Packer, a member of the Quorum of the Twelve Apostles, explained the source and process of personal revelation:

"Following baptism, one is confirmed a member of The Church of Jesus Christ of Latter-day Saints in a brief ordinance, during which there is conferred the gift of the Holy Ghost. Thereafter, all through life, men, women, even little children receive the right to inspired direction to guide them in their lives—personal revelation! (See Alma 32:23.)

"The Holy Ghost communicates with the spirit through the mind more than through the physical senses. This guidance comes as thoughts, as feelings, through impressions and promptings. It is not always easy to describe inspiration. The scriptures teach us that we may "feel" the words of spiritual communication more than hear them, and see with spiritual rather than with mortal eyes. [See 1 Ne. 17:45.]

"The patterns of revelation are not dramatic. The voice of inspiration is a still voice, a small voice. There need be no trance, no sanctimonious declaration. It is quieter and simpler than that."

In another sermon, Packer warned Latter Day Saints against the dangers of over reliance on a rational or theological approach to knowledge of gospel principles:

"The witness is not communicated through the intellect alone, however bright the intellect may be.

"'The natural man,' Paul told us, 'receiveth not the things of the Spirit of God: for they are foolishness unto him: neither can he know them, because they are spiritually discerned.' (1 Cor. 2:13–14.)

"Recently the Council of the First Presidency and Quorum of Twelve Apostles issued a statement alerting members of the Church to the dangers of participating in circles which concentrate on doctrine and ordinances and measure them by the intellect alone.

"If doctrines and behavior are measured by the intellect alone, the essential spiritual ingredient is missing, and we will be misled.

"Personal testimony is confirmed to us initially and is reaffirmed and enlarged thereafter through a harmonious combining of both the intellect and the spirit."

LDS Church President Spencer W. Kimball also emphasized the importance of personal revelation versus the analytical approach in understanding the message of Jesus Christ:

"It should also be kept in mind that God cannot be found through research alone, nor his gospel understood and appreciated by study only, for no one may know the Father or the Son but 'he to whom the Son will reveal him'. The skeptic will some day either in time or eternity learn to his sorrow that his egotism has robbed him of much joy and growth, and that as has been decreed by the Lord: The things of God cannot be understood by the spirit of man; that man cannot by himself find out God or his program; that no amount of scientific or philosophical research nor rationalizing will bring a testimony, but it must come through the heart when compliance with the program has made the person eligible to receive that reward."

Although Latter Day Saints believe that personal revelation is an essential part of the plan of salvation, leaders of the church emphasize that true personal revelation should never contradict official revelation from the leadership of the church. Hartman Rector Jr. taught some basic criteria during a speech at BYU entitled "How to Know if Revelation Is from the Lord" that can help members of the church know whether the revelation that someone receives is actually coming from God. The following excerpt is the conclusion of this speech.

"Just by way of review, here is how to know if an idea is from God:

"One, is it within the bounds and limitations of your calling, and does it require a service consistent with your calling?

"Two, is it consistent with the revealed word of God? The scriptures and the directions of the living prophet of God today--those are the revealed words of God.

"Three, is the receiver of the communication a fit receptacle? Is he in condition to receive such a communication from the Lord?

"Four, does the communication edify and cause you to rejoice?

"Five, does it cause your bosom to burn or speak peace to your soul, or are you left troubled by the communication?

"Six, is the communication vivid to the understanding, or does it leave a cloud or a hazy impression?"

James E. Faust explained the difference between apostolic and personal revelation: "The prophets, seers, and revelators have had and still have the responsibility and privilege of receiving and declaring the word of God for the world. Individual members, parents, and leaders have the right to receive revelation for their own responsibility but have no duty nor right to declare the word of God beyond the limits of their own responsibility."

=== Spirit of prophecy ===
The concept of the "spirit of prophecy" as found in the LDS Church was first described by Joseph Smith, who believed that each individual person was capable of receiving revelation for themselves and those they presided over in their group or family. This enables Latter Day Saints to understand to what extent they are in harmony with the mind and the will of God. The term "personal revelation" is also common parlance.

Two Biblical scriptures that are often used to remind LDS adherents of the importance of seeking personal revelation are Revelation 19:10, which concludes: "worship God: for the testimony of Jesus is the spirit of prophecy" and Numbers 11:29, which concludes: "would God that all the Lord's people were prophets, and that the Lord would put his spirit upon them!" Thus, the spirit of prophecy is understood to be an important gift of the Spirit that is available through adherence to true worship of God, obedience to the laws and ordinances of the gospel, study of the scriptures, following leaders who have been called by revelation, and understanding the guidance offered by the gift of the Holy Ghost. (See Doctrine and Covenants Sections 8 and 9).

== Practice ==
Each Latter-day Saint is expected to use personal revelation to determine how best to apply gospel principles and the commandments in his or her life in a path toward perfection. It is accepted that not all members will agree on how to interpret the same scripture; rather, each person is responsible to determine how it should be interpreted for himself or herself.

For example, the dietary code called the Word of Wisdom contains the statement "And again, hot drinks are not for the body or belly." Church leaders later clarified the words "hot drinks" to mean coffee and tea. The Word of Wisdom is interpreted in various ways within the church. Although abstinence from coffee, tea, alcohol and tobacco are considered 'absolutes' by most Latter-day Saints, many will drink decaffeinated coffee or herbal tea. Some Latter-day Saints choose to avoid Coca-Cola, Pepsi, and other drinks containing caffeine, but other Latter-day Saints see nothing wrong with drinking such beverages. In the 2010s, official statements from the Church clarified that drinking caffeine was not a violation of the Word of Wisdom. Adherents to the Latter Day Saint movement likewise interpret the other parts of the Word of Wisdom relating to the kinds of foods to be eaten and avoided in various ways. It is considered inappropriate for one person to challenge another person's interpretation, although priesthood leaders such as bishops may determine when an interpretation is outside acceptable bounds. Rationalization of interpretations is tempered by the belief that each person must answer for their choices at the final judgment.

Individuals are encouraged to rely on personal revelation and to never take leader's statements at face value without investigating for themselves if they be true. Brigham Young said,

"I am more afraid that this people have so much confidence in their leaders that they will not inquire for themselves of God whether they are led by him. I am fearful that they settle down in a state of blind self security, trusting their eternal destiny in the hands of their leaders with a reckless confidence that in itself would thwart the purpose of God in their salvation .... Let every man and woman know, by the whispering of the Spirit of God to themselves, whether their leaders are walking in the path the Lord dictates, or not."

J. Reuben Clark wrote that there is only one way that church members can be sure that leaders are speaking for the Lord,

"I have given some thought to this question, and the answer thereto so far as I can determine, is: We can tell when the speakers are 'moved upon by the Holy Ghost' only when we, ourselves, are ‘moved upon by the Holy Ghost.’ In a way, this completely shifts the responsibility from them to us to determine when they so speak."

== Future scripture ==
Many Latter-day Saints believe that new scripture will be revealed or discovered and translated involving prophets among the Ten Lost Tribes at some time before or during the Millennium (Book of Mormon, 2 Nephi 29:13).

== See also ==
- 1978 Revelation on Priesthood
- Direct revelation
