= Progressive illumination =

Progressive illumination is a theological concept describing the hermeneutical practice of orthodox theological development, most notably in Christianity; though the practice exists in many religions, especially Abrahamic religions. The term is used mostly among Christian theologians. It is distinct from progressive revelation in that it does not describe the reception from God of new divine texts, or any novel concept that has no accepted foundation. Rather it describes God-given understanding of existing revelation in a better and more accurate way. It usually refers to understanding a biblical concept better, but the term also encompasses understanding creation better, even through scientific inquiry.
