= Progressive revelation (Christianity) =

Doctrine that the Bible progressively reveals God

Progressive revelation is the doctrine in Christianity that the sections of the Bible that were written later contain a fuller revelation of God than the earlier sections. "Progressive revelation does not mean to say that the Old Testament is somehow less true than the New Testament. The progress was not from untruth to truth – it was from less information to more full information."

For instance, the theologian Charles Hodge wrote:

The progressive character of divine revelation is recognized in relation to all the great doctrines of the Bible... What at first is only obscurely intimated is gradually unfolded in subsequent parts of the sacred volume, until the truth is revealed in its fulness.

== See also ==
- Biblical inspiration
- Christian views on the Old Covenant
- Continuous revelation
- Deposit of faith
- Direct revelation
- Dispensationalism
- General revelation
- Special revelation
- Supersessionism
- Development of doctrine
