= Thought inspiration =

Thought Inspiration is a form of divine inspiration in which revelation takes place in the mind of the writer, as opposed to verbal inspiration, in which the word of God is communicated directly to the writer. The theologian George La Piana claims that after 19th century advancements in philological and historical criticism showed sacred books of different religions to be similar in form and content, the "theological doctrine of biblical inspiration which had put these books in a class by themselves underwent a rapid change, from 'verbal inspiration' to 'thought inspiration' and from 'thought inspiration' to a vague 'moral inspiration,' such as could be attributed to many a book of ancient philosophy or poetry."

In one instance Ellen White, a 19th-century Seventh-Day Adventist proclaimed prophet and author, expressed it this way:

"The Bible is written by inspired men, but it is not God's mode of thought and expression. It is that of humanity. God, as a writer, is not represented. Men will often say such an expression is not like God. But God has not put Himself in words, in logic, in rhetoric, on trial in the Bible. The writers of the Bible were God's penmen, not His pen. Look at the different writers.

It is not the words of the Bible that are inspired, but the men that were inspired. Inspiration acts not on the man's words or his expressions but on the man himself, who, under the influence of the Holy Ghost, is imbued with thoughts. But the words receive the impress of the individual mind. The divine mind is diffused. The divine mind and will is combined with the human mind and will; thus the utterances of the man are the word of God."

This position emerged into prominence in the Seventh-Day Adventist church after the 1919 Bible Conference, in an effort to harmonize the Bible and Ellen G. White's writings which Adventists claimed as "divinely inspired". This position has been heavily criticised in Evangelical circles.

== See also ==
- Inspiration of Ellen White
