= Private revelation =

Christian concept

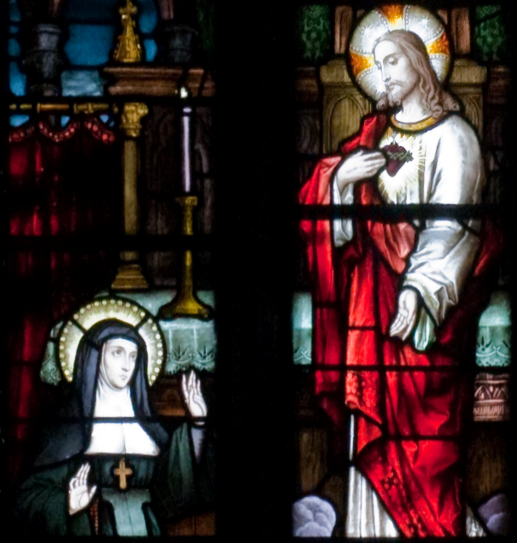
The Sacred Heart of Jesus revealed to Margaret Mary Alacoque

In Christian theology, a private revelation is an instance of revelation, in a broader sense of the term, of divine reality to a person or persons. It contrasts with revelation intended for humanity at large, which is sometimes termed public revelation.

The Catholic Church has an official skeptical predisposition toward accounts of private revelation is maintained. When recognized by the authority of the church – after their credibility and religious significance has been judged positively by the local Catholic bishop – these messages are considered helpful to believers "in a certain period of history". Still, faith in them is equated to human faith, as opposed to supernaturally bestowed faith, and such beliefs are not dogmatically taught. Private revelations come in a variety of types, such as Marian apparitions and visions. Any such revelation is deemed not to add to or amend the completed revelation, but as a heavenly message that helps its recipients and other faithful live by revelation.

== Catholic theology ==
According to the Catechism of the Catholic Church, public revelation was complete in New Testament times, but depends on interpretation and deepening understanding of this foundational or "definitive" revelation:

66. "The Christian economy, therefore, since it is the new and definitive Covenant, will never pass away; and no new public revelation is to be expected before the glorious manifestation of our Lord Jesus Christ." (Note: Catechism footnote 28: "Dei verbum §4; cf. 1 Timothy 6:14; Titus 2:13.") Yet even if Revelation is already complete, it has not been made completely explicit; it remains for Christian faith gradually to grasp its full significance over the course of the centuries.
67. Throughout the ages, there have been so-called "private" revelations, some of which have been recognized by the authority of the Church. They do not belong, however, to the deposit of faith. It is not their role to improve or complete Christ's definitive Revelation, but to help live more fully by it in a certain period of history. Guided by the Magisterium of the Church, the sensus fidelium knows how to discern and welcome in these revelations whatever constitutes an authentic call of Christ or his saints to the Church.
  Christian faith cannot accept "revelations" that claim to surpass or correct the Revelation of which Christ is the fulfilment, as is the case in certain nonChristian religions and also in certain recent sects which base themselves on such "revelations".
97. "Sacred Tradition and Sacred Scripture make up a single sacred deposit of the Word of God" (DV 10) in which, as in a mirror, the pilgrim Church contemplates God, the source of all her riches.[emphasis in original]

The Catechism teaches that divine revelation was fulfilled, completed, and perfected in Christ. In this sense, Catholics believe that Christ is the fullness and mediator, author and interpreter, purpose and center of public revelation. Hence, public revelation is the deposit of faith and rule of faith and must be lived by all Catholics. Thomas Aquinas taught that all public revelation ended with the death of John the Apostle. Private revelations are believed to be incapable of surpassing, correcting, improving, fulfilling, completing, or perfecting public revelation. The Catechism further teaches that divine revelation, since it is contained in the Word of God and in Christ, also includes the living tradition or sensus fidelium, the magisterium, the sacraments, and Catholic dogma.

As the living tradition and the magisterium are a part of divine revelation, they are both believed to have divine authority. Catholicism teaches that because the sacraments are a part of divine revelation, their natures cannot be changed (for example, receiving Holy Communion without mortal sin) but their ways of celebration can be changed (for example, receiving Holy Communion in the hand or on the tongue). Catholic dogma is believed to be a part of divine revelation, and therefore immutable. But what truths are dogmas has needed to be clarified by church councils, and the much more numerous doctrines have yielded to varied and increased understanding based on solid study of the Biblical roots and of the history of the topic. For this the work of theologians is indispensable, since the charism of the bishops is not to receive revelations but to determine what is Catholic teaching, the more so in doctrines that are more central to the faith and dogmatically taught. The Second Vatican Council of Bishops maintained a careful line between the "two source" (Scripture and the living tradition) and "one source" explanation of revelation, careful to acknowledge the ultimate priority of the original deposit of faith: "For Sacred Scripture is the word of God inasmuch as it is consigned to writing under the inspiration of the divine Spirit, while sacred tradition takes the word of God entrusted by Christ the Lord and the Holy Spirit to the Apostles, and hands it on to their successors in its full purity, so that led by the light of the Spirit of truth, they may in proclaiming it preserve this word of God faithfully, explain it, and make it more widely known."

In the doctrine of the Catechism, the revelations in the Word of God – such as the apparition of the three angels to Abraham and the angel who wrestled Jacob; the burning bush; the theophany on Mount Sinai; the pillar of cloud and pillar of fire; the visions and prophecies of the prophets; Elijah's test at the cave, and his assumption; the revelation to Peter ("You are the Christ"); the apparitions of the risen Christ to the Apostles, including the exceptional and unique apparition to Paul; the various miracles recorded in the Acts of the Apostles and in the Epistles; and the entire Book of Revelation – are not private revelations but are public revelation, though their original meaning and relevance for modern Catholicism are subject to interpretation. The apparition of Our Lady of the Pillar to James the Greater is a private revelation, since it depends on facts not contained in the original deposit of faith.

The Catechism maintains that Christ promised that the Holy Spirit would lead the church into every truth, and that therefore God leads the church into a deeper understanding of the original deposit of faith. The magisterium of the Catholic Church, therefore, carefully examines private revelations, to assure that they are in accord with church doctrine. Catholic sources argue that this is necessary because Christ warned that false prophets would come and that the tree will be known by its fruit.

=== Types of revelation ===
Private revelation, in Catholicism, is a heavenly message that helps people live by divine revelation. Various types of private revelations have been reported in the Catholic Church.

The Catechism doctrine is that private revelations can come to anyone for so long as God pleases. Some address the visionary, while others address more people. For instance, Our Lady of Laus was said to have appeared to a young shepherdess for many years, while Our Lady of Kibeho apparently addressed the leaders of the nation of Rwanda. The appearances of the Blessed Virgin Mary are usually called Marian apparitions. These generally include a vision of the Blessed Virgin, accompanied by brief messages. These are by far the most widely reported form. Well known examples of approved Marian apparitions include Our Lady of Guadalupe, Our Lady of Lourdes and Our Lady of Fátima. These apparitions are considered private revelations from God through the Virgin Mary.

In Catholic belief, Marian visions do not mean Mary appears as a disembodied spirit, since she has been assumed into heaven. However, it is probable that Mary could appear in bodily form by bilocation.

A number of apparitions of Jesus Christ following his ascension have been reported. Some of these have received approval, as safe for private belief, from the Holy See. For instance, the Vatican biography of Faustina Kowalska quotes some of her conversations with Jesus.

The Catholic teaching is that apparitions of Jesus are not the same as the real presence of Christ in the Eucharist, even if they include Eucharistic adoration, because the sacraments are a part of public revelation. The apparitions are also not the same as the Second Coming, because the church believes Jesus "will come again in glory to judge the living and the dead."

There are reports of interior locutions in which inner voices are reported, but no vision of divinity is claimed. The Vatican biographies of both Teresa of Ávila and Mother Teresa of Calcutta refer to their interior locutions, although Mother Teresa often preferred to remain private about them.

Some private revelations produce large amounts of text, while others amount to a few reported sentences. For instance, the priest Stefano Gobbi produced a book of messages attributed to the Blessed Virgin Mary, while Mary of the Divine Heart Droste zu Vischering simply wrote two letters to Pope Leo XIII with a message attributed to Jesus Christ, prompting the Pope to consecrate the world to the Sacred Heart of Jesus.

The Catholic Church does not regard spiritism, automatic writing, astrology, fortune-telling, psychic powers, magic, divination, conjuring the dead, etc. as types of private revelations, instead classing them as occultism. The Catholic Church does not regard private revelations as having authority over the Pope or the bishops in communion with him, because Catholicism gives the church, the bishop, and public revelation divine authority as a matter of faith, while teaching that private revelations are not a matter of faith but are believed with human faith. Catholic theologians argue that private revelations neither have divine authority nor can they be believed with divine and catholic faith, offering as evidence the teaching that the Magisterium infallibly interprets the inerrant Word of God, whereas saints are believed to be capable of making errors about the details of private revelations, since fallen human nature is inclined to sin and error.

=== Sources of revelation ===
According to the Catholic Church, private revelations come from God, while false revelations come either from human or demonic sources. Just as in exorcism, the Catholic Church is careful to distinguish between supernatural events, mental illness, drug abuse, deception, and demonic activity. The church gathers a team of scientists, theologians, and other experts to test the spirit of the alleged visionary to see if they are genuine, psychotic or manipulative, influenced by drugs, deceptive or deceived, or possessed by demons.

According to the Catholic Church, revelations from God are an extraordinary grace which confirms Catholic doctrine and dogma. One famous example is Our Lady of Lourdes, who declared Mary to be the Immaculate Conception four years after the dogma of the Immaculate Conception was proclaimed. Catholicism teaches that revelations are not to be confused with holiness, and that no one can rightfully desire to receive revelations. The Catholic teaching is that revelations which occur in unexpected ways are intended as reminders of public revelation. For instance, the stigmata are interpreted as a reminder of the Paschal Mystery; weeping statues as a reminder of sin and mercy; and the mystical ring of Catherine of Siena as a reminder of mystical marriage.

Eugenia Ravasio reported a series of messages from God the Father, which were published as "The Father speaks to His children". Ravasio's messages were approved by Alexander Caillot, bishop of Grenoble, who ordered an investigation and after ten years issued a letter stating that the messages had a divine nature. In 1988 the messages received also the imprimatur of Petrus Canisius Van Lierde, the Vicar General for the Vatican City State, whose general duties were the administration of daily functions of Vatican City. The Congregation for the Doctrine of the Faith at the Holy See, which is the official authority for approving private revelations on behalf of the Catholic Church, did not declare Ravasio's writings heresy.

=== False revelations ===
Catholicism distinguishes between what it believes to be true revelations, and various sources of revelations it does not recognize. One source of false revelations, according to Catholicism, is pareidolia, where people see visions or hear voices where there are none. It is church doctrine that apparitions and visions cannot be photographed and messages and locutions cannot be recorded.

Catholicism teaches that false revelations may also result from misattribution, where people put words into saints' and other persons' mouths, such as the "three days of darkness" prophecy attributed to Pio of Pietrelcina, the "end-times" prophecy attributed to Our Lady of Laus, and the Medjugorje sayings attributed to Pope John Paul II.

According to the Catholic Church, false revelations may also result from demonic possession, and Satan can appear like an angel of light and rebuke people for their sins, and mimic the miracles and revelations of God. The most famous case is Magdalena de la Cruz, through whom Satan is supposed to have uttered false prophecies and fabricated miracles, including uncreated light, stigmata, levitation, ecstasy, and extraordinary fasting (she allegedly survived solely on the Eucharist).

The Catholic Encyclopedia argues that it is a misconception that the Catholic Church is quick to accept mental illness or drug abuse, such as schizophrenia or hallucinogens, for private revelation and demonic activity. Catholic sources argue that the Catholic Church is skeptical, and only accepts private revelation after discernment, because it is "the pillar and bulwark of the truth" and because it has a long history of dealing with fraudulent visionaries.

=== Discernment of revelation ===
Catholicism teaches that all charisms, including the charisms of prophecy, speaking in tongues, and miracles, are subject to discernment. It uses the 1978 Normae Congregationis to discern and judge private revelations. After an alleged private revelation has been judged by the local Catholic bishop to be worthy of belief, the private revelation is said to contain nothing contrary to Catholic faith or morals, the faithful are authorized to prudently believe in the private revelation (without obligation), and it is legal to publish the private revelation.

Firstly, the local Catholic bishop judges the alleged revelation according to its "fruits", or outcomes:

- Good Fruits:
  - The alleged revelation likely happened/is happening, and is not attributable to postdiction and hoaxes.
  - The alleged visionary is mentally healthy, honest, humble, and lives a normal life.
  - Conformity to public revelation and immunity from error in faith or morals.
  - Healthy devotion to the alleged revelation (adherence to Dogma, submission to the Bishop, obedience of faith, etc.)
  - Abundant spiritual fruits that spring from said healthy devotion (prayer, conversion, charity, etc.)
  - Example according to the church: the revelations to the Polish mystic Faustina Kowalska were promoted by Pope John Paul II from before his papacy, and received his approval as safe in practice.
- Bad Fruits:
  - The alleged revelation did not actually happen (someone mistaking sun dogs for a miracle, etc.)
  - Doctrinal errors attributed to God or a Saint, although this does not include redaction.
  - Using the alleged revelation for fame, fortune, sex, or other gains.
  - Occultism or other grave sins (drug abuse, etc.) in connection with the alleged revelation.
  - Mental illness, psychotic tendencies, and demonic activity.
  - Example according to the church: the Mariavite revelations contained heresy and attacked critics, despite promoting popular piety and frequency of the sacraments.

When judgment is favorable, the bishop permits a local devotion without judging the revelation to be worthy of belief, which can include being favorable toward miracles in connection with the revelation without approving of the revelation itself. This step is commonly called "approved for faith expression." Then, after the bishop sees a healthy devotion to the revelation and abundant spiritual fruits spring from said devotion, he judges the revelation to be worthy of belief: the private revelation contains nothing contrary to Catholic faith or morals, the faithful are authorized to prudently believe in the private revelation (without obligation), and it is legal to publish the private revelation. In addition, the bishop approves of the titles – such as "Our Lady" – given to a Marian apparition (Our Lady of Lourdes, for example).

Judgment on private revelations falls under a bishop's ordinary magisterium, which is authoritative but noninfallible and requires religious submission of intellect and will. A bishop or his successor could overturn a prior judgment, such as happened in the case of the apparitions of The Lady of All Nations.

A bishop can judge an alleged private revelation to be either worthy of belief (constat de supernaturalitate) or not worthy of belief (constat de non supernaturalitate). A private revelation that is worthy of belief can receive full approval if it is approved by the Pope, such as happened with the revelations to Margaret Mary Alacoque. Papal approval does not include popes visiting sites of alleged revelations, granting special privileges to shrines, offering gifts to alleged visionaries, or speaking favorably of alleged revelations or visionaries. A private revelation that is not worthy of belief can either be more fully investigated or, if bad fruits are found, condemned. A condemned revelation may not be followed, believed, or published by the faithful.

A bishop can judge an alleged private revelation before it ends, such as was the case with the prophecies of Montanus (condemned) and the prophecies of Elizabeth Barton (approved). Fraudulent visionaries sometimes counter the negative judgments of their bishops, and skeptics of authentic revelations sometimes counter positive judgments, by saying the bishops did not do a thorough investigation, such as interviewing the visionaries.

Not all reports of private revelation are approved, even if they have good fruits. For instance, reports of Our Lady of Surbiton appearing every day under a pine tree in England were flatly rejected by the Vatican as a fraud.

It is permissible, with the bishop's permission, to make a shrine in honor of an approved revelation. However, no one is obligated to believe in a private revelation, since it is not public revelation; just as no one is obligated to practice popular piety, since it is not the liturgy. Only public revelation and the liturgy are obligatory, for they are necessary for salvation. Despite this, some Catholics, such as the Fatima Crusaders, believe the rosary is necessary for world peace because Our Lady of Fatima said "Pray the Rosary every day, in order to obtain peace for the world, and the end of the war."

=== Publication of revelation ===
On 23 October 1995, the Congregation for the Doctrine of the Faith issued a press release regarding Vassula Rydén's private revelations:

With regard to the spreading of texts of presumed personal revelations, the Congregation makes it clear that:
1. The interpretation by some people of a decision approved by Paul VI on October 14, 1966, and promulgated on November 15 of the same year, by virtue of which writings and messages coming from presumed revelations might be freely spread within the Church is absolutely not valid. This decision actually referred to the "Abolition of the Index of Banned Books," and said that -- once relative censures were lifted -- the moral obligation in any case not to spread or read those writings which endangered faith and morals still remained.
2. A reminder, therefore, that for the diffusion of texts of presumed private revelations, the norm of the Code in force, Canon 823, para 1, which gives pastors the right "to demand that the writings of the faithful which touch faith or morals be submitted to their own judgment before publication", remains valid.
3. Presumed supernatural revelations and writings which regard them are in the first instance subject to the judgment of the diocesan bishop and, in particular cases, to that of the episcopal conference and the Congregation of the Doctrine of the Faith.

It is a misconception that the faithful do not need permission to publish alleged private revelations since the abolition of Canon 1399 and 2318 of the former Canonical Code by Pope Paul VI in AAS 58 (1966) on 14 October 1966. The truth is that Pope Paul VI only abolished the Index Librorum Prohibitorum, and that Canon 823 and 824 of the current 1983 Code of Canon Law define the right and duty of the bishop to censor all material concerning faith or morals.

The canonization of a mystic or an imprimatur given to a book of revelations do not mean a private revelation is authentic, because the church does not pronounce on alleged revelations when it pronounces on the holiness of an individual and because the Imprimatur only guarantees that a book is free from all doctrinal and moral errors.

=== Controversy ===
Certain private revelations have been the subject of conspiracy theories. The theories include church coverups, church officials siding with the local government to destroy apparitions, visionaries' doubles, and church corruption.

== Latter Day Saint theology ==
In the Latter Day Saint movement, continuing revelation is the principle that God or his divine agents still continue to communicate to humankind. The founder of the movement Joseph Smith, Jr. used the example of the Lord's revelations to Moses in Deuteronomy to explain the importance and necessity of continuous revelation to guide "those who seek diligently to know [God's] precepts":

God said, "Thou shalt not kill" Deuteronomy 5:17 at another time He said, "Thou shalt utterly destroy." Deuteronomy 7:2; 12:2; 20:17 This is the principle on which the government of heaven is conducted-by revelation adapted to the circumstances in which the children of the kingdom are placed. Whatever God requires is right, no matter what it is, although we may not see the reason thereof till long after the events transpire . . . As God has designed our happiness-and the happiness of all His creatures, He never has – He never will – institute an ordinance or give a commandment to His people that is not calculated in its nature to promote that happiness which He has designed, and which will not end in the greatest amount of good and glory to those who become the recipients of his law and ordinances... for all things shall be made known unto them in [His] own due time, and in the end they shall have joy.

— Joseph Smith, Teachings of the Prophet Joseph Smith, pp. 256–7.

Both the Church of Jesus Christ of Latter-day Saints (LDS Church) and the Community of Christ, the two largest denominations in the Latter Day Saint movement have a tradition of continuing revelation and have added modern public revelations to their canon of scriptures. In the LDS Church, in addition to teaching the importance of studying the words of both ancient and modern prophets, the church also emphasize the necessity of private or personal revelation from God by the power of the Holy Ghost as the only pathway to true knowledge of Jesus Christ:

"But the Comforter, which is the Holy Ghost, whom the Father will send in my name, he shall teach you all things, and bring all things to your remembrance, whatsoever I have said unto you."

"He saith unto them, But whom say ye that I am? And Simon Peter answered and said, Thou art the Christ, the Son of the living God. And Jesus answered and said unto him, Blessed art thou, Simon Bar-jona: for flesh and blood hath not revealed it unto thee, but my Father which is in heaven."

Boyd K. Packer, a member of the Quorum of the Twelve Apostles, explained the source and process of personal revelation:

"Following baptism, one is confirmed a member of The Church of Jesus Christ of Latter-day Saints in a brief ordinance, during which there is conferred the gift of the Holy Ghost. Thereafter, all through life, men, women, even little children receive the right to inspired direction to guide them in their lives—personal revelation! (See Alma 32:23.)

"The Holy Ghost communicates with the spirit through the mind more than through the physical senses. This guidance comes as thoughts, as feelings, through impressions and promptings. It is not always easy to describe inspiration. The scriptures teach us that we may "feel" the words of spiritual communication more than hear them, and see with spiritual rather than with mortal eyes. [See 1 Ne. 17:45.]

"The patterns of revelation are not dramatic. The voice of inspiration is a still voice, a small voice. There need be no trance, no sanctimonious declaration. It is quieter and simpler than that."

In another sermon, Packer warned Latter-day Saints against the dangers of over reliance on a rational or theological approach to knowledge of gospel principles:

"The witness is not communicated through the intellect alone, however bright the intellect may be.

"'The natural man,' Paul told us, 'receiveth not the things of the Spirit of God: for they are foolishness unto him: neither can he know them, because they are spiritually discerned.' (1 Cor. 2:13–14.)

"Recently the Council of the First Presidency and Quorum of Twelve Apostles issued a statement alerting members of the Church to the dangers of participating in circles which concentrate on doctrine and ordinances and measure them by the intellect alone.

"If doctrines and behavior are measured by the intellect alone, the essential spiritual ingredient is missing, and we will be misled.

"Personal testimony is confirmed to us initially and is reaffirmed and enlarged thereafter through a harmonious combining of both the intellect and the spirit."

LDS Church President Spencer W. Kimball also emphasized the importance of personal revelation versus the analytical approach in understanding the message of Jesus Christ:

"It should also be kept in mind that God cannot be found through research alone, nor his gospel understood and appreciated by study only, for no one may know the Father or the Son but 'he to whom the Son will reveal him'. The skeptic will some day either in time or eternity learn to his sorrow that his egotism has robbed him of much joy and growth, and that as has been decreed by the Lord: The things of God cannot be understood by the spirit of man; that man cannot by himself find out God or his program; that no amount of scientific or philosophical research nor rationalizing will bring a testimony, but it must come through the heart when compliance with the program has made the person eligible to receive that reward."

Although Latter-day Saints believe that personal revelation is an essential part of the plan of salvation, leaders of the church emphasize that true personal revelation should never contradict official revelation from the leadership of the church. Hartman Rector Jr. taught some basic criteria during a speech at BYU entitled "How to Know if Revelation Is from the Lord" that can help members of the church know whether the revelation that someone receives is actually coming from God. The following excerpt is the conclusion of this speech:

"Just by way of review, here is how to know if an idea is from God:

"One, is it within the bounds and limitations of your calling, and does it require a service consistent with your calling?
"Two, is it consistent with the revealed word of God? The scriptures and the directions of the living prophet of God today--those are the revealed words of God.
"Three, is the receiver of the communication a fit receptacle? Is he in condition to receive such a communication from the Lord?
"Four, does the communication edify and cause you to rejoice?
"Five, does it cause your bosom to burn or speak peace to your soul, or are you left troubled by the communication?

"Six, is the communication vivid to the understanding, or does it leave a cloud or a hazy impression?"

James E. Faust explained the difference between apostolic and personal revelation: "The prophets, seers, and revelators have had and still have the responsibility and privilege of receiving and declaring the word of God for the world. Individual members, parents, and leaders have the right to receive revelation for their own responsibility but have no duty nor right to declare the word of God beyond the limits of their own responsibility."

== See also ==
- Beatific vision
- Christian contemplation
- Marian apparition
- Mysticism
- Neo-revelationism
- Psychology of religion
- Religious experience
- Revelation (Latter Day Saints)
- Somnium Scipionis
- Theosis (Eastern Christian theology)
- Vision (spirituality)
- Visions of Jesus and Mary
