= Verbal dictation =

Theory about the creation of the Bible

Verbal dictation describes a theory about how the Holy Spirit was involved with the people who first physically inscribed the Bible. According to this theory, the words of Scripture were dictated to man, who spoke and wrote them down. The human role was a purely mechanical one; their individuality was bypassed whilst they wrote. This may have been the original understanding of inspiration for the people of the Bible. The cultural and historical context has been a point of disagreement among verbal dictationists: Some believe that the historical context in which the Scriptures were penned still matters, while others do not.

People who believed in verbal dictation include:

Athenagoras: "And you too will admit, excelling all others as you do in intelligence and in piety towards the true God (τὸ ὄντως θεῖον), that it would be irrational for us to cease to believe in the Spirit from God, who moved the mouths of the prophets like musical instruments, and to give heed to mere human opinions."(underline added)

Irenaeus: "We should leave things of that nature to God who created us, being most properly assured that the Scriptures are indeed perfect, since they were spoken by the Word of God and His Spirit; but we, inasmuch as we are inferior to, and later in existence than, the Word of God and His Spirit, are on that very account destitute of the knowledge of His mysteries."

King James I: "The whole Scripture is dictated by God’s Spirit, thereby, as by his lively word, to instruct and rule the whole Church militant to the end of the world:"

According to James Barr, this theory of inspiration was popular among Protestant theologians during the sixteenth and seventeenth centuries. According to Frederic Farrar, Martin Luther did not understand inspiration to mean that scripture was dictated in a purely mechanical manner. Instead, Luther "held that they were not dictated by the Holy Spirit, but that His illumination produced in the minds of their writers the knowledge of salvation, so that divine truth had been expressed in human form, and the knowledge of God had become a personal possession of man. The actual writing was a human not a supernatural act." Farrar says that John Calvin also rejected the verbal dictation theory. Today, according to T.D. Lea and H.P. Griffen, "[n]o respected Evangelicals maintain that God dictated the words of Scripture."

Independent Baptist preacher, Dr. Phil Stringer, also holds to this view, stating: "Inspiration is dictation. ... Inspiration did suspend self-consciousness, suppress human faculties and interfere with the free exercise of the distinctive mental characteristics of individuals."

== See also ==
- Biblical inspiration
