= Special revelation =

Christian theological concept

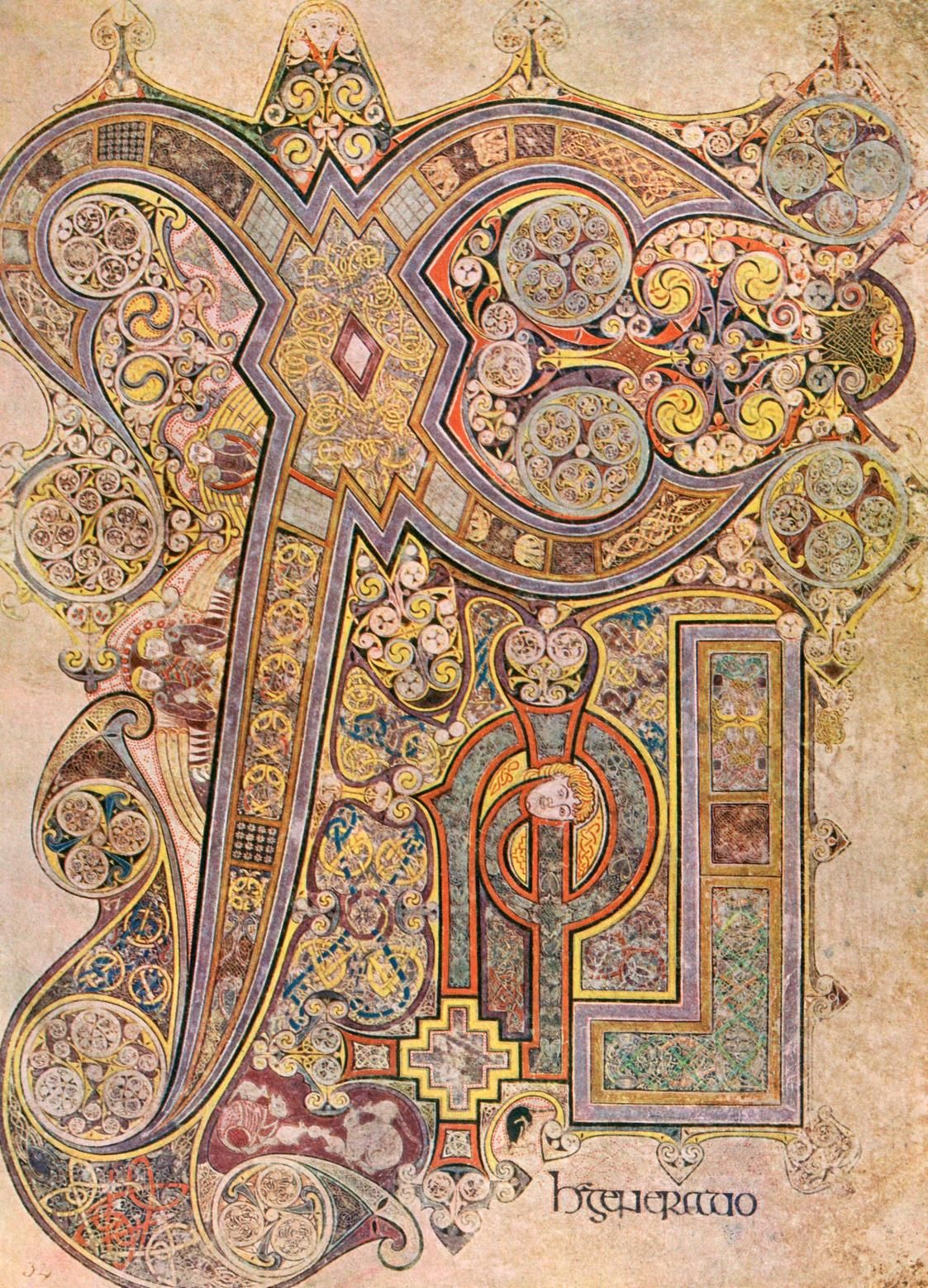
The Chi Rho Monogram from the Book of Kells, a 9th-century Celtic illuminated manuscript of the Gospels, a form of special revelation.

Special revelation is a concept in Christian theology that refers to God's revelation as it is made exclusively to his chosen people in his divine Word; spoken or written Scripture, for his glory and their salvation. This is a special rather than general disclosure of the knowledge of God through means other than those which are available to all people, such as the observation of nature, philosophy, reason, conscience or providence.

According to Dumitru Stăniloae, the Eastern Orthodox Church's position on general and special revelation stands in stark contrast to Protestant and Roman Catholic theology, which marks a clear difference between the two and tends to posit that the former is not sufficient for salvation. In Eastern Orthodox Christianity, Stăniloae argues, there is no separation between the two and supernatural revelation merely embodies the former in historical persons and actions.

== Characteristics ==
Christian theologians claim that the disclosure of special revelation is at specific times to specific persons, especially during the ministry of Jesus Christ, and is preserved in Scripture. The purpose of special revelation is to impart the knowledge and understanding of Jesus Christ, salvation and the atonement. Essentially it is knowledge and understanding, 'that is requisite to salvation, that is, an explicit knowledge of Christ and his gospel.' Forms of special revelation as considered legitimate by mainstream Christianity include the following.

1. Personal experience
2. Miracles
3. Prophecy
4. The earthly life of Jesus Christ
5. Scripture

American Presbyterian theologian B. B. Warfield describes special revelation in relation to general revelation; 'There is the revelation which God continuously makes to all men: by it His power and Divinity are made known. And there is the revelation which He makes exclusively to His chosen people: through it His saving grace is made known. Both species or stages of revelation are insisted upon throughout the Scriptures. They are, for example, brought significantly together in such a declaration as we find in Psalm 19: "The heavens declare the glory of God . . . their line is gone out through all the earth" (vv. 1, 4); "The law of Jehovah is perfect, restoring the soul" (v. 7).'

He goes on to posit a close interdependence with general revelation; 'Revelation, therefore, in its double form was the Divine purpose for man from the beginning. [...] Without special revelation, general revelation would be for sinful men incomplete and ineffective, and could issue, as in point of fact it has issued wherever it alone has been accessible, only in leaving them without excuse (Romans 1:20). Without general revelation, special revelation would lack that basis in the fundamental knowledge of God as the mighty and wise, righteous and good, maker and ruler of all things, apart from which the further revelation of this great God’s interventions in the world for the salvation of sinners could not be either intelligible, credible or operative.' Thus, general revelation can be understood as the everyday experience of life, but is dependent on the interpretation of those experiences as revealing God's involvement in external events or things through special revelation.

The necessity of special revelation in order to truly understand general revelation is expanded upon by John Calvin in his Institutes of the Christian Religion (1.6.1). Due to the corruption of human nature by original sin, general revelation requires further illumination in the form of special revelation, so that humans may know God more fully.

For as the aged, or those whose sight is defective, when any book, however fair, is set before them, though they perceive that there is something written, are scarcely able to make out two consecutive words, but, when aided by glasses, begin to read distinctly, so Scripture, gathering together the impressions of Deity, which, till then, lay confused in our minds, dissipates the darkness, and shows us the true God clearly.’ He adds that ‘it is necessary to apply to Scripture, in order to learn the sure marks which distinguish God, as the Creator of the world, from the whole herd of fictitious gods. [...] God, the Maker of the world, is manifested to us in Scripture, and his true character expounded, so as to save us from wandering up and down, as in a labyrinth, in search of some doubtful deity.

In view of the specific substance in the immediately below paragraph it is important that recipients of special revelation are provided with a reference perspective for potential defence of their experiences. This can be accomplished by viewing special revelation as consisting of three intensities or levels, with the middle intensity referred to as medium intensity, and the level deemed to be 'above' sometimes referred to as high intensity. Such a triad will allow peace of mind for many, and will remove the challenge of having to potentially defend one's experience against another's (even to oneself), inasmuch as there are no distinct boundary areas regarding those three intensities of special revelation. Also, a special revelation comfort zone, regardless of the intensity of the experience(s), does not oblige one to have to assess implications of one having possibly transitioned to what is referred to below as direct revelation.

Other means by which God purportedly gave special revelation were divine voice, writing or dictation, angels, prophets, visions, dreams, dream-visions, inspiration, and guidance from the Holy Spirit. When reviewing these examples, one can see that there is some overlap with direct revelation, which denotes personal communication from God through hearing a voice, for example, rather than the revelation which is made in Scripture to Christians.

== See also ==
- General revelation
- Continuous revelation
- Private revelation
- Supernatural revelation
- Theophany
