= Direct revelation =

Communication from God to a person

Direct revelation is a term used by some Christian churches to express their belief in a communication from God to a person by words, impression, visions, dreams, or actual appearance. Direct revelation is believed to be an open communication between God and man, or the Holy Spirit and man, without any other exterior (secondary) means. Direct revelation from evil spirits can also occur.

Examples of this are seen in God communicating the Ten Commandments to Moses on Mount Sinai (Exodus 34:4); or the devil communicating knowledge to Jesus Christ during his temptation in the wilderness (Luke 4:1-12) or the appearance of an angel to Manoah's wife telling her that she shall bear Samson (Judges 13:2). Direct revelation is classified as special revelation. Still, the word "direct" has come to make this type of revelation distinct.

== Pentecostal and Charismatic Christianity ==
Pentecostal and Charismatic Christianity have always maintained that God directly speaks today through direct means such as dreams, visions, voices, impressions, and signs (or meaningful coincidences). While these Christians have emphasized speaking in tongues or even praying for healing, for the longest time Charismatics have shied away from expressing the gift of prophecy – which is the cause of these direct spiritual experiences. The reason for this is that Christian prophets in history have often come into conflict with the pastors and religious authorities of the church hierarchy. Throughout church history, Christian prophets have usually been mystics or people that practiced divine contemplation or soaking prayer.

Various Christian groups throughout church history could be labeled "prophetic", because they have welcomed the gift of prophecy in their church meetings and lives: the Montanists, the Desert Fathers, various orders of Catholic monasticism such as the Dominicans and the Discalced Carmelites, the Waldensians, the Anabaptists, the Jansenists, the Quietists, the Quakers, the French prophets, various people in the Great Awakening and Second Great Awakening, the Irvingites, individuals in the Holiness movement, the early Pentecostal movement, the Latter Rain revival, the Charismatic movement, the Jesus movement, the Vineyard; and especially the Kansas City prophets, Dukh-i-zhizniki, the Toronto Blessing movement, and Bethel Church in Redding, California.

== Church of Jesus Christ of Latter-day Saints ==
The Church of Jesus Christ of Latter-day Saints (LDS Church) teaches that God restored direct revelation as recently as the nineteenth century by way of Joseph Smith and the First Vision. Since then, direct revelation has been the teaching and practice of the LDS Church. The Latter-day Saints believe that direct revelation is available to all mankind who diligently seek God with sincerity and real intent. "Every devoted, obedient and righteous person on the earth has and does receive revelation from God."

According to the LDS Church, there are two basic types of direct revelation, public and personal. Public revelation refers to the revelation of God’s will to his chosen prophets, seers, and revelators. These revelations are to guide the church, its functions, direction, and doctrinal stance. "These public revelations usually illuminate scriptural passages that are doctrinal rather than those that are descriptive or directive."

Personal or private revelations pertain to that person's life. A person can receive personal revelation from God as would God's prophet, but the difference lies in its purpose. This revelation is to edify, enlighten and fill the soul of that person and assist them in their lives, both in a general sense and a religious or spiritual sense. A person can receive private revelation for him/herself or their immediate family, but will not receive this revelation for others outside their family or the church. This revelation is considered an integral part of the life of the faithful.

Sometimes personal revelation affects nations or the world but in a more indirect manner. In this sense, God inspires certain people in history to impart knowledge and moral truths. God "enlightens" the works of certain people that have influence or will have influence upon the world. God enlightened "great religious leaders of the world such as Muhammad, Confucius, and the Reformers, as well as philosophers including Socrates, Plato, and others. This was to bring whole nations to a higher level of understanding."

== See also ==
- Private revelation
- Continuous revelation
- General revelation
- Progressive revelation (Christian)
