= General revelation =

Christian theological concept

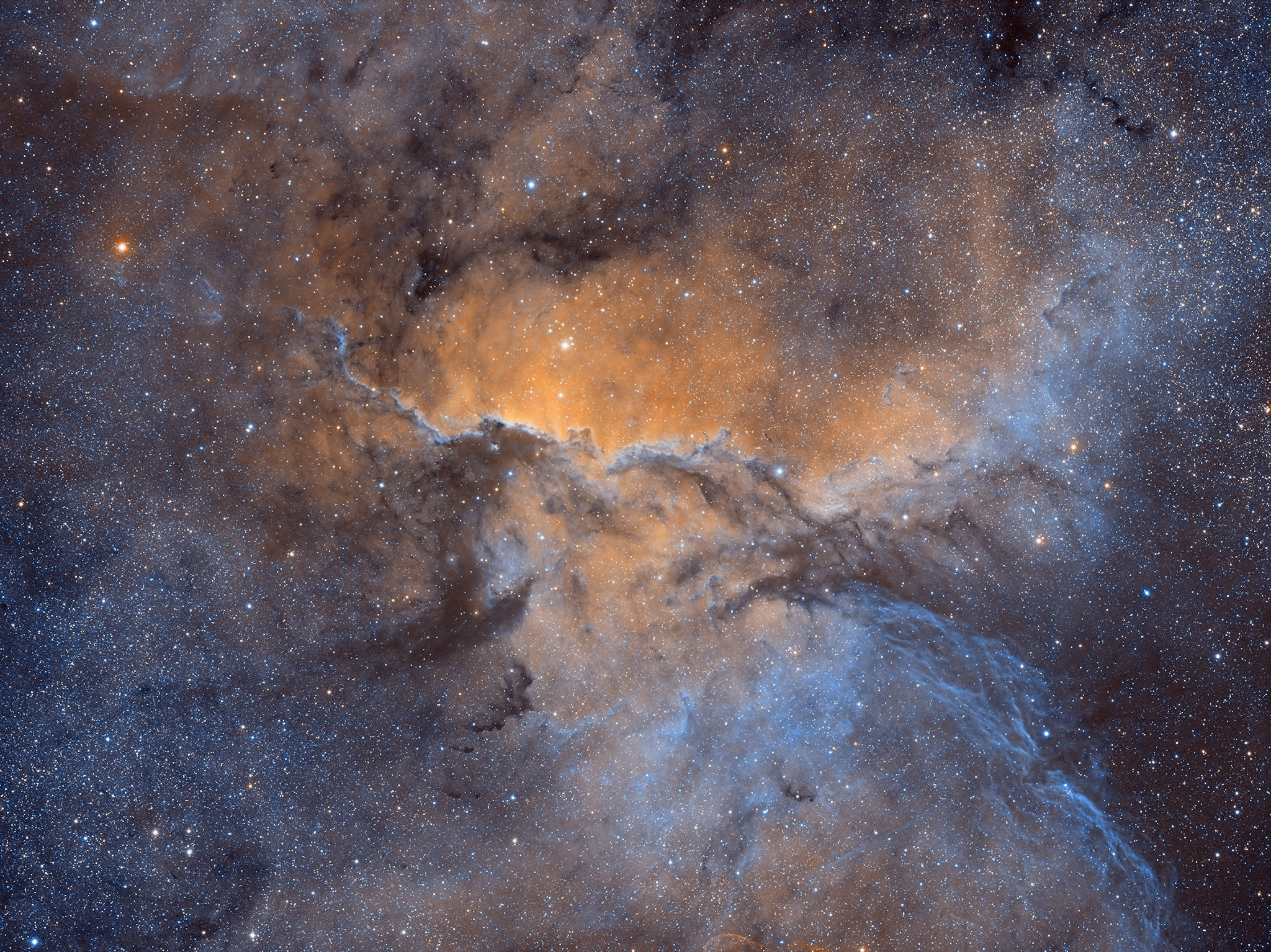
The heavens declare the glory of God; and the firmament sheweth his handywork. (Psalm 19:1) — This verse is taken as a description of God revealing his own character through natural means to all men.

General revelation, or natural revelation, is a concept in Christian theology that refers to God's revelation as it is 'made to all men everywhere', which is discovered through natural means, such as observations of nature (the physical universe), philosophy and reasoning. Christian theologians use the term to describe the knowledge of God purported to be plainly available to all of humanity. General revelation is usually understood to pertain to outward temporal events that are experienced within the world or the physical universe. The definition may be extended to include human conscience or providence (or providential history).

According to Dumitru Stăniloae, the Eastern Orthodox Church's position on general and special revelation stands in stark contrast to Protestant and Roman Catholic theology, which marks a clear difference between the two and tends to posit that the former is not sufficient for salvation. In Eastern Orthodox Christianity, Stăniloae argues, there is no separation between the two and supernatural revelation merely embodies the former in historical persons and actions.

== Characteristics ==
Christian theologians cite passages of Scripture to ground the concept of general revelation, for example, Romans 1:20, Psalm 19:1–6 and Matthew 5:45. The following is a non-exhaustive list of fields of knowledge which fall under general revelation.

1. Nature / the physical universe: The laws and nature of the physical universe as it transpires are interpreted as displaying God's attributes of existence, knowledge, wisdom, power, order, greatness, supremacy, righteousness and goodness.
2. Philosophy: An example would be the philosophical arguments of Thomas Aquinas known as the Five Ways, which may lead one to knowledge of God.
3. History: The study of history may reveal an aspect of divine providence, which is defined in Webster's 1828 Dictionary as 'proceeding from divine direction or superintendence; as the providential contrivance of things; as a providential escape from danger.'
4. Human conscience: God is said to instill the innate ability in all people to discern the difference between right and wrong, to choose and act on that discernment and judgment according to free will and conscience, and to experience guilt when the act or choice is wrong. One of the arguments for the existence of God is based on moral sense in humans.

American Presbyterian theologian B. B. Warfield describes general revelation in relation to special revelation; 'There is the revelation which God continuously makes to all men: by it His power and Divinity are made known. And there is the revelation which He makes exclusively to His chosen people: through it His saving grace is made known. Both species or stages of revelation are insisted upon throughout the Scriptures. They are, for example, brought significantly together in such a declaration as we find in Psalm 19: "The heavens declare the glory of God ... their line is gone out through all the earth" (vv. 1, 4); "The law of Jehovah is perfect, restoring the soul" (v. 7).'

He goes on to posit a close interdependence with special revelation:

Revelation, therefore, in its double form was the Divine purpose for man from the beginning. [...] Without special revelation, general revelation would be for sinful men incomplete and ineffective, and could issue, as in point of fact it has issued wherever it alone has been accessible, only in leaving them without excuse (Romans 1:20). Without general revelation, special revelation would lack that basis in the fundamental knowledge of God as the mighty and wise, righteous and good, maker and ruler of all things, apart from which the further revelation of this great God’s interventions in the world for the salvation of sinners could not be either intelligible, credible or operative.

Thus, general revelation can be understood as the everyday experience of life, but is dependent on the interpretation of those experiences as revealing God's involvement in external events or things.

General revelation is distinguished from direct revelation, which involves the direct communication from God to a person, as opposed to the indirect and varied means through which God communicates in general revelation.

== See also ==
- Special revelation
- Biblical inspiration
- Continuous revelation
- Private revelation
- Theophany
