= Continuous revelation =

Belief in ongoing contact from God

Continuous revelation or continuing revelation is a theological belief or position that God continues to reveal divine principles or commandments to humanity.

In Christian traditions, it is most commonly associated with the Latter Day Saint movement, the Religious Society of Friends (Quakers), and with Pentecostal and Charismatic Christianity, though it is found in some other denominations as well.

Continuous revelation also forms part of the rituals of gatherings in various chapters of Taoism. In the Bahá'í Faith, progressive revelation is an important concept that is similar to continuous revelation.

A notable factor of continuous or continuing revelation as a source of divine commandments and statements is the written recording of such statements in an open scriptural canon, as is the case with the Latter Day Saints origin churches with Community of Christ in particular adding frequently to their Doctrine and Covenants in recent years. While more frequent with the Latter Day Saints, it is less frequent with the Bahá'í Faith, with progressive revelation only being periodically expanded over an extremely long period.

== Baháʼí Faith ==
Progressive revelation is a core teaching in the Baháʼí Faith that suggests that religious truth is revealed by God progressively and cyclically over time through a series of divine messengers or prophets, known as Manifestation of God, and that the teachings are tailored to suit the needs of the time and place of their appearance. Baháʼí teachings consider several world religions as different stages in the history of one religion, while believing that the revelation of Baháʼu'lláh is the most recent (though there will never be a last), and therefore the most relevant to modern society.

Baháʼís believe each Manifestation of God establishes a covenant and founds a religion. This process of revelation, according to the Baháʼí writings, is also never ceasing. The general theme of the successive and continuous religions founded by Manifestations of God is that there is an evolutionary tendency, and that each Manifestation brings a larger measure of revelation (or religion) to humankind than the previous one. The differences in the revelation brought by the Manifestations of God is stated to be not inherent in the characteristics of the Manifestation of God, but instead attributed to the various worldly, societal and human factors; these differences are in accordance with the "conditions" and "varying requirements of the age" and the "spiritual capacity" of humanity which is increasing over time.

== Christianity ==
=== Roman Catholicism ===
Vatican II states "no new public revelation is to be expected before the glorious manifestation of our Lord, Jesus Christ." The notion of progressive or continuing revelation is not held by the Catholic Church, who instead favor the idea of tradition and development of doctrine. Progressivist and continuationist approaches are condemned, such as is outlined in the 2000 declaration Dominus Iesus prepared by the Dicastery for the Doctrine of the Faith.

Private revelation may be recognized by the church, so long as it does not "claim to surpass or correct the Revelation of which Christ is the fulfilment". It cannot, however, be considered part of the deposit of faith.

=== Protestantism ===
Protestants generally teach that the modern age is not a period of continuing public revelation.

=== Friends (Quakers) ===
The Religious Society of Friends (Quakers) affirm continuing revelation through the Inner light or the light within, which is the presence of God which provides illumination and guidance to the individual and through individuals to the group. Some, usually African and Evangelical, Friends hold that individual revelations should be tested against the Bible, while others place less importance on scripture. Both groups believe that the Inner Light speaks to people directly and not just through the text of the Bible.

Because Friends believe that revelation is ongoing, they have no set creed or dogmas. As early Friends listened to the Inner light and endeavored to live accordingly, some common lived expressions of faith emerged, which became known as testimonies. Although rooted in the immediate experience of the Society of Friends, Quakers believe much of the testimonies may be verified in the Bible, especially as described in the Gospels regarding the life and teachings of Jesus.

=== The Church of Jesus Christ of Latter-day Saints ===
In the Church of Jesus Christ of Latter-day Saints (LDS Church), the largest denomination in the Latter Day Saint movement, continuing revelation is the principle that God or his divine agents still continue to communicate to humankind. Joseph Smith, founder of the Latter Day Saint movement, used the example of the Lord's revelations to Moses in Deuteronomy to explain the importance and necessity of continuous revelation to guide "those who seek diligently to know [God's] precepts":

God said, "Thou shalt not kill" [Deuteronomy 5:17] at another time He said, "Thou shalt utterly destroy." [Deuteronomy 7:2; 12;2; 20:17]. This is the principle on which the government of heaven is conducted-by revelation adapted to the circumstances in which the children of the kingdom are placed. Whatever God requires is right, no matter what it is, although we may not see the reason thereof till long after the events transpire [...] As God has designed our happiness—and the happiness of all His creatures, He never has—He never will—institute an ordinance or give a commandment to His people that is not calculated in its nature to promote that happiness which He has designed, and which will not end in the greatest amount of good and glory to those who become the recipients of his law and ordinances... for all things shall be made known unto them in [His] own due time, and in the end they shall have joy.

— Joseph Smith, Teachings of the Prophet Joseph Smith, pp. 256–7.

The LDS Church believes in continuing revelation, not continuous revelation, and differentiates between the two.

==== Personal versus church-wide revelation ====
The LDS Church distinguishes between personal revelation and revelation directed to all members of the church. Members believe that personal revelation can come to any individual with a righteous desire, for example to direct someone in their search for truth. In contrast, revelation for the entire church only comes to those who have been called by God as prophets, which in the LDS Church includes the First Presidency and the Quorum of the Twelve Apostles.

==== Opposition to continued revelation ====
Church members see the tendency to dismiss the possibility that God could call modern prophets as similar to the attitude of those in the Bible who rejected the prophets and/or apostles of their day; the sense of change in the message of Jesus and the apostles led many to regard them as false prophets. Jesus himself warned against false prophets, teaching that the way to distinguish between a true and a false prophet was "by their fruits"; however, the perceived threat to tradition was often a strong enough deterrent to cause the witnesses of good fruits (such as powerful sermons or miraculous healings) to dismiss them as the work of the devil. After Jesus ordained his apostles, he warned them of the extreme opposition they would encounter for these reasons, telling them, "ye shall be hated of all men for my name's sake". Jesus also said, "Woe unto you, when all men shall speak well of you! For so did their fathers to the false prophets," thus illustrating that opposition will naturally accompany a true prophet if they are doing their job correctly.

==== Apostasy ====
Sometimes the opposition against God's prophets escalated to the point of violence and martyrdom, which Jesus and the apostles frequently referenced while preaching to their detractors (Matthew 23:31–37, Luke 11:47–51, Acts 7:52, Romans 11:3, 1 Thessalonians 2:15). In this sense, church members acknowledge that revelation has not continued uninterrupted throughout history, being that the killing of God's prophets sometimes resulted in periods without church-wide revelation—which church members refer to as apostasies. Similar to prophets before them, Peter and the apostles also suffered martyrdom at the hands of their persecutors—with the exception of John who was banished to the Isle of Patmos. This view is in contrast to the mainstream Christian view that the apostolic era came to a close because revelation had reached its completion.

LDS Church members believe that once the Christian church was no longer led by revelation, its doctrine began to be altered by theologians who took it upon themselves to continue developing doctrine, despite not being called or authorized to receive revelation for the church body. In the absence of revelation, these theologians often resorted to speculation, which coupled with their own interpretations and extrapolations of scripture, inevitably resulted in disagreement and division on many doctrinal points. Ecumenical councils were held in order to settle these differences, yet without prophets called and authorized to reveal God's will on the topics being debated, the attendees could only vote on the theories presented in order to decide which ones would become official doctrine—a practice that served to ostracize as heretics those who did not go along with these decisions, and in some cases led to major schisms in the church. Church members view this process of doctrinal development as completely foreign to God's established pattern of revealing doctrine through a prophet. They point to history as incontrovertible proof that humans are incapable of agreeing on how to interpret the Bible (2 Peter 1:20), which should act as a strong indicator that God's purpose for the Bible was not to derive doctrine, but rather to support it. When doctrine is not established and maintained through continued revelation, church members see the inevitable result as "philosophies of man, mingled with scripture".

==== Restoration ====
LDS Church members again point to the Bible to show that after every period of apostasy, God always eventually called another prophet when the time was right. It is in that same spirit that church members claim that once conditions were ready, God again resumed his pattern of revealing his will through prophets by calling Joseph Smith, through whom he restored the fullness of the gospel of Jesus Christ, clearing up the error that had been introduced during the Great Apostasy. Church members believe that since that time, revelation through prophets and apostles has continued unbroken until the present day, God having promised that revelation will not be taken again from the earth before the Second Coming of Christ.

==== Open scriptural canon ====
The open scriptural canon of the LDS Church is based on the principle of continuous revelation. Its 9th Article of Faith states:

We believe all that God has revealed, all that He does now reveal, and we believe that He will yet reveal many great and important things pertaining to the Kingdom of God.

Members of the LDS Church anticipate additions to its canon, including the translation of the remaining two-thirds of the golden plates, which was the source of the Book of Mormon.

=== Community of Christ ===
The Community of Christ (formerly the Reorganized Church of Jesus Christ of Latter Day Saints), the second largest Latter Day Saint denomination, regularly canonizes revelation into its Doctrine and Covenants. Continuing revelation is one of the enduring principles of the church which "define the essence, heart, and soul of our faith community. They describe the personality of our church as expressed throughout the world."

==== Prophetic people ====
In recent years, the church has begun to redefine the process of revelation from one that comes from the top down with an appointed Prophet providing revelation to the church to one that is more collaborative and bottom up with the people increasingly becoming involved in the revelatory process as a community. This change has included theological and procedural changes including concepts such as faithful disagreement which allows for open debate, dialogue and disagreement within the church body without consequence.

One of the most clear explications of the role of a prophetic people in the church was canonised in the church's Doctrine and Covenants on March 29, 2004.

== Islam ==
The phrase Khatamu 'n-Nabiyyīn ("Seal of the Prophets") is a title used in the Quran to designate the prophet Muhammad. It is generally regarded to mean that Muhammad is the last of the prophets sent by God.

=== Ahmadiyya ===
Ahmadi Muslims believe that while law-bearing revelation has ended with the perfection of scripture in the form of the Quran, non-scriptural revelation to non-prophets and non-law-bearing Muslim prophets continues. They cite Quranic verses and Ahadith, which are considered by many to be authentic in support of their belief in continuous revelation.

== Judaism ==
Reform Judaism is centered on a continual revelation and that "revelation is a continuous process, confined to no one group and to no one age," according to the Movement's 1937 Columbus Platform.

Conservative Judaism teaches God's revelation at Mount Sinai and God's continuing revelation through study of Jewish texts and through life as a Jewish believer.

== Taoism ==
In various designated offshoots of Taoism like the De Schools in Malaysia, Singapore and Hong Kong, and the Dao Schools in Hong Kong, Taiwan and China, weekly or sometimes monthly gatherings are held at temples to receive and understand communications from above by way of two mediums holding rattan sifts writing on sand, who are 'dictated' with news ranging in contents from current affairs, religion, to arts and morality; the writings are called Sift Text or '乩文'.

== See also ==
- Direct revelation
- General revelation
- Tertön
- Terma (religion)
