= Teachings of the Prophet Joseph Smith (book) =

Book of teachings from Joseph Smith

- Author: Joseph Smith, Joseph Fielding Smith (compiler)
- Language: English
- Subject: Teachings of Joseph Smith
- Publisher: Deseret Book Company
- Publication date: 1938
- Publication place: United States
- Media type: Print (Hardcover)
- Pages: 410 pp
- OCLC: 718055

Teachings of the Prophet Joseph Smith is a book compiling selected sermons and portions of sermons and sundry teachings of Joseph Smith, the first prophet of the Church of Jesus Christ of Latter Day Saints.

The title page reads as follows:

TEACHINGS OF THE PROPHET JOSEPH SMITH — Taken from his sermons and writings as they are found in the Documentary History and other publications of the Church and written or published in the days of the Prophet's ministry — Selected and arranged by the Historian, Joseph Fielding Smith, and his Assistants in the Historian's Office of the Church of Jesus Christ of Latter-day Saints.

Apostle Joseph Fielding Smith is generally given credit for editing the book, although he had extensive help from fellow researchers.

The book is published by Deseret Book and is a widely used reference work among membership of the Church of Jesus Christ of Latter-day Saints (LDS Church).

In 1993, Deseret Book issued a revised edition of the work edited by Richard C. Galbraith entitled Scriptural Teachings of the Prophet Joseph Smith. This revised work retains the basic text of the work but supplements it with extensive footnoted references to scriptures of the LDS Church.

== See also ==
- History of the Church, a seven-volume work that is the source of the selections in Teachings
