= Biblical inspiration =

Doctrine in Christian theology

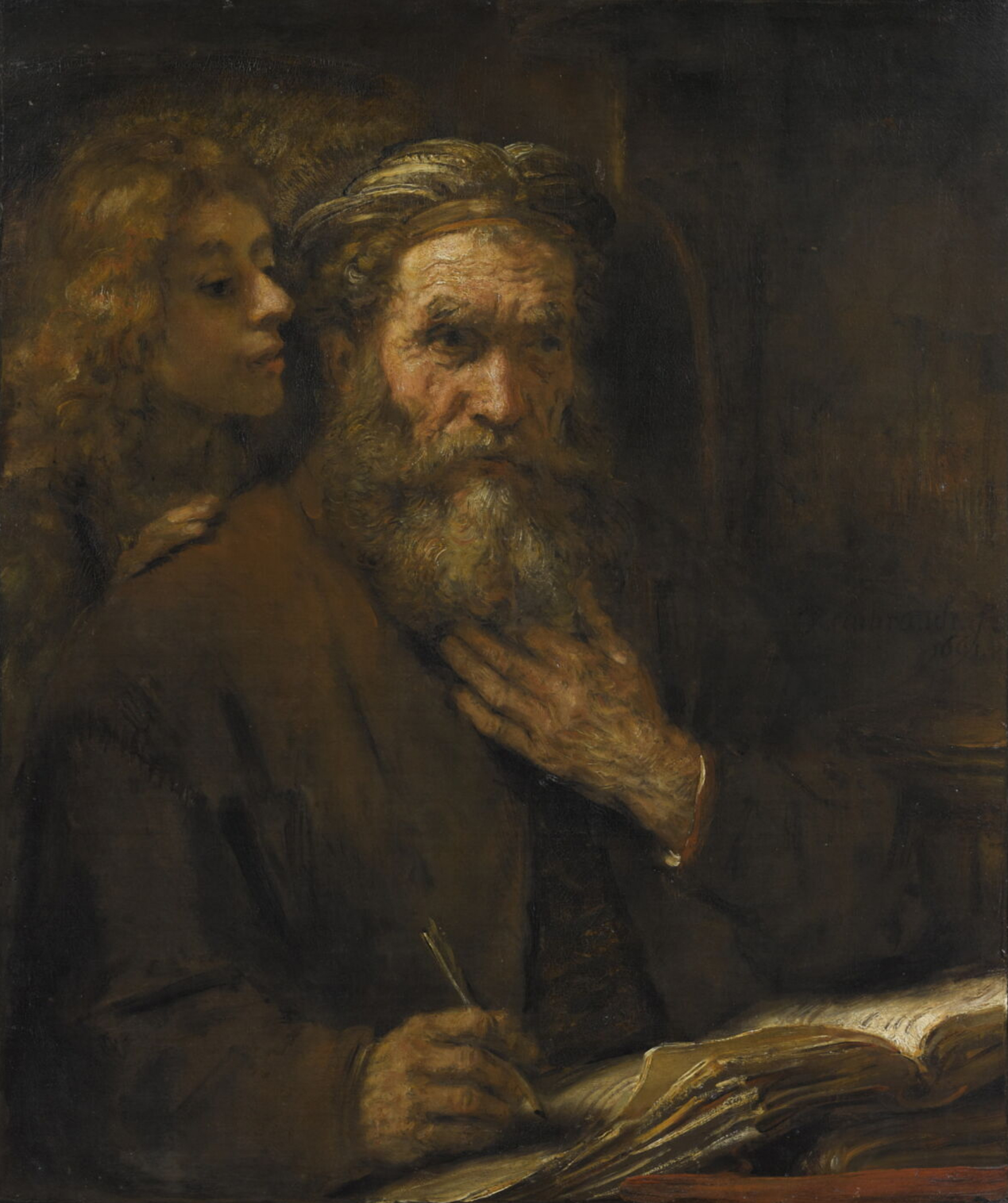
Rembrandt's The Evangelist Matthew Inspired by an Angel (1661)

Biblical inspiration is the doctrine in Christian theology that the human writers and canonizers of the Bible were led by God with the result that their writings may be designated in some sense the word of God. This belief is traditionally associated with concepts of the biblical infallibility and the internal consistency of the Bible.

== Theopneustos ==
At 2 Timothy 3:16 (NRSVue), it is written: "All scripture is inspired by God [theopneustos] and is useful for teaching".

When Jerome translated the Greek text of the Bible into the language of the Vulgate, he translated the Greek theopneustos (θεόπνευστος) of 2 Timothy 3:16 as divinitus inspirata ("divinely breathed into").

Some modern English translations opt for "God-breathed" (NIV) or "breathed out by God" (ESV). The -tos ending in the Greek theopneustos also designates a passive construct whereby the subject God is breathing out the object (scripture).

Theologian C. H. Dodd suggests that it is "probably to be rendered" as: "Every inspired Scripture is also useful".

Daniel B. Wallace states that numerous scholars believe that the proper translation should be: "Every inspired scripture is also profitable". Wallace, however, criticises this translation; he proposes the translation "every scripture is inspired and profitable".

== Evangelical viewpoint ==
Evangelicals view the Bible as superintended by the Holy Spirit, preserving the writers' works from error without eliminating their specific concerns, situation, or style. This divine involvement, they say, allowed the biblical writers to communicate without corrupting God's own message both to the immediate recipients of the writings and to those who would come after. Some Evangelicals have labelled the conservative or traditional view as "verbal, plenary inspiration of the original manuscripts", by which they mean that each word (not just the overarching ideas or concepts) was meaningfully chosen under the superintendence of God.

Evangelicals acknowledge the existence of textual variations between biblical accounts of apparently identical events and speeches. They see these as complementary, not contradictory, and explain them as the differing viewpoints of different writers. For instance, the Gospel of Matthew was intended to communicate the Gospel to Jews, the Gospel of Luke to Greeks, and the Gospel of Mark to Romans. Evangelical apologists such as John W. Haley in his book Alleged Discrepancies in the Bible and Norman Geisler in When Critics Ask have proposed answers to hundreds of claimed contradictions. Some discrepancies are accounted for by changes from the master manuscripts (which are alleged to contain very nearly the original text and) that these alterations were introduced as copies were made (maybe of copies themselves), either deliberately or accidentally.

Three basic approaches to inspiration are often described when the evangelical approach to scripture is discussed:

- Verbal plenary inspiration: This view gives a greater role to the human writers of the Bible while maintaining a belief that God preserved the integrity of the words of the Bible. The effect of inspiration was to move the writers so as to produce the words God wanted. In this view the human writers' "individual backgrounds, personal traits, and literary styles were authentically theirs, but had been providentially prepared by God for use as his instrument in producing Scripture". However, the theory nuances that "God so mysteriously superintended the process that every word written was also the exact word he wanted to be written—free from all error".
- Verbal dictation theory: The dictation theory claims that God dictated the books of the Bible word by word, suggesting the writers were no more than tools used to communicate God's precisely intended message.
- Dynamic inspiration: The thoughts contained in the Bible are inspired, but the words used were left to the individual writers. This suggests the underlying message of the Scriptures are inspired, while the exact wording is dynamic.
- Partial inspiration: the Bible is infallible in matters of faith and practice/morals, yet it could have errors in history or science (e.g. the Big Bang could be true, and the Genesis creation account is more allegorical than historical).
- Intuition theory: The authors of the Scriptures were merely wise men, so the Bible is inspired by human insight.

Theories seeing only parts of the Bible as inspired ("partial inspiration") meet with insistent emphasis on plenary inspiration on the part of its proponents.

=== Criticism ===
The New American Commentary by T.D. Lea and H.P. Griffen says "[n]o respected Evangelicals maintain that God dictated the words of Scripture". By this, Lea & Griffen were referring to the entirety of the Scriptures, i.e. every single word in the Bible. Lea & Griffen meant that they advocated verbal plenary inspiration as fact, instead of the verbal dictation theory.

The Evangelical position was criticized as being circular by Catholic Answers. They claimed that the Bible can only be used to prove doctrines of biblical inspiration if the doctrine is assumed to begin with. Some defenders of the evangelical doctrine such as B. B. Warfield and Charles Hodge, however, moved away from a circular argument and "committed themselves to the legitimacy of external verification" to inductively prove the doctrine, though they placed some restrictions on the evidences that could be considered.

== Lutheran and Reformed viewpoints ==
The Apology of the Augsburg Confession identifies Holy Scripture with the Word of God and calls the Holy Spirit the author of the Bible. Article 3 (entitled 'Of the Written Word of God') of the Belgic Confession, a Reformed confession of faith, states "We confess that this Word of God was not sent nor delivered by the will of man, but that holy men of God spake as they were moved by the Holy Ghost, as the apostle Peter saith (2 Peter 1:21). And that afterwards God, from a special care which He has for us and our salvation, commanded His servants, the prophets and apostles, to commit His revealed Word to writing; and He Himself wrote with His own finger the two tables of the law. Therefore we call such writings holy and divine Scriptures." Here a consensus with Lutheranism is apparent, namely, that Scripture is conceived of as being the 'Word of God' by virtue of its principal author, the Holy Spirit, which used human authors as instruments to write Scripture without superseding their humanity.

According to Frederic Farrar, Martin Luther did not understand inspiration to mean that the scriptures were dictated in a purely mechanical manner. Instead, Luther "held that they were not dictated by the Holy Spirit, but that His illumination produced in the minds of their writers the knowledge of salvation, so that divine truth had been expressed in human form, and the knowledge of God had become a personal possession of man. The actual writing was a human not a supernatural act". John Calvin also rejected the verbal dictation theory.

Luther asserted that "He [the pious Christian] should not doubt that however simple they [the Scriptures] may seem, these are the very words, deeds, judgments, and history of the high majesty and wisdom of God; for this is the Scripture which makes fools out of all the wise".

The doctrine of sola scriptura was one of the central teachings during the Protestant Reformation. It teaches that the Bible is the final authority for moral, spiritual, and for some, civil matters. As Luther said, "The true rule is this: God's Word shall establish articles of faith, and no one else, not even an angel can do so".

== Catholic viewpoint ==
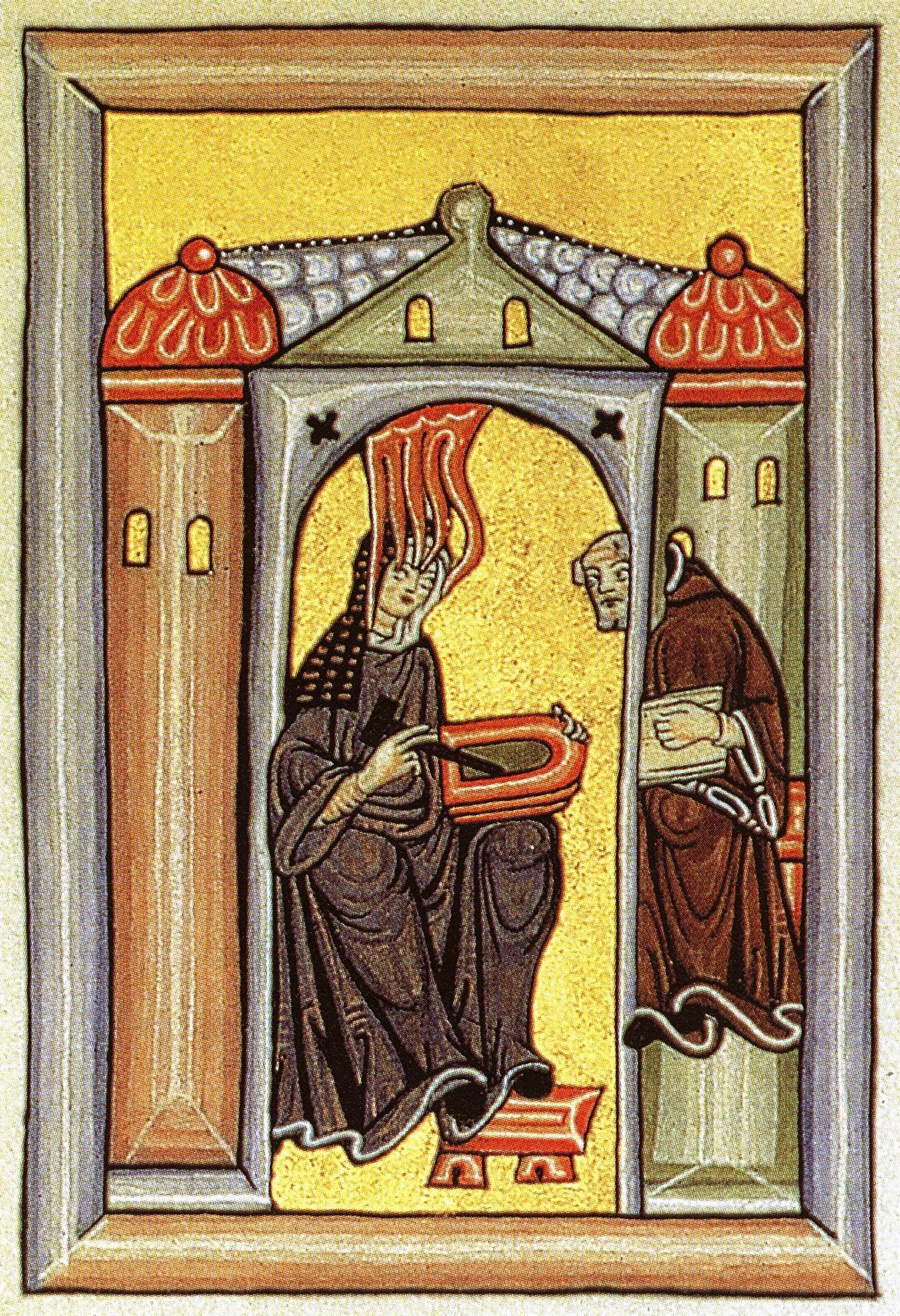
Hildegard of Bingen receiving divine inspiration (illustration in the Rupertsberger Codex, c. 1180)

The Catechism of the Catholic Church alleges that the Bible's human writers were "consigned to writing whatever he wanted written, and no more". The Catechism also claims that the Bible "without error teach that truth which God, for the sake of our salvation, wished to see confided to the Sacred Scriptures". The Catholic Church holds the Bible as inspired by God, but that it does not view God as the direct author of the Bible, in the sense that he does not put a 'ready-made' book in the mind of the inspired person.

Pope Benedict XVI gave the following explanation in 2007:

The Scripture emerged from within the heart of a living subject — the pilgrim people of God — and lives within this same subject. [...] [T]he individual author or group of authors [...] are not autonomous [...] they form part of [...] the "people of God," [...] the deeper "author" of the Scriptures. [...] [L]ikewise, this people [...] knows that it is led, and spoken to, by God himself, who — through men and their humanity — is at the deepest level the one speaking.

The Catholic view of biblical inspiration stems from the belief in the historical authenticity of the foundation of an infallible Church, and Jesus' grant of teaching authority to that church through his Apostles. Because the Catholic Church designated the biblical canon through its tradition, its authority to identify the inspired books is accepted, rather than any self-contained or inherent claims of the Scriptures themselves.

== Liberal Christian viewpoint ==
The typical view within Liberal Christianity and Progressive Christianity rejects the idea that the Bible is divinely inspired. Some advocates of higher criticism who espouse this view even go so far as to regard the Bible as purely a product of human invention. However, most form critics, such as Rudolf Bultmann (1884–1976) and Walter Brueggemann (1933–2025 ), still regard the Bible as a sacred text, just not a text that communicates the unaltered word of God.

== Neo-orthodox viewpoint ==
Emil Brunner (1889–1966) was one of the primary advocates of Neo-orthodoxy. He wrote: "[T]he Christian Church believes the Bible to be the Word of God", and that "Christian faith is Bible faith". He also wrote: "Yes, God has made known the secret of His will through the Prophets and Apostles in the Holy Scriptures". Brunner rhetorically asked, "Is the whole Bible God's Word then?"; Brunner answered, "Yes, insofar as it speaks of that which is 'here' in Christ". Brunner's illustration, relying on the name of the label His Master's Voice, was: "If you buy a phonograph record you are told that you will hear the Master Caruso. Is that true? Of course! But really his voice? Certainly! And yet—there are some noises made by the machine which are not the Master's voice". Brunner adds: "[T]he Bible[...] makes the real Master's voice audible,—really his voice, his words, what he wants to say". Brunner ultimately concludes: "Only a fool listens to the incidental noises when he might listen to his Master's voice!".

== Other viewpoints ==
A 2011 Gallup survey reports, "A 49% plurality of Americans say the Bible is the inspired word of God but that it should not be taken literally, consistently the most common view in Gallup's nearly 40-year history of this question".

== See also ==
- Biblical inerrancy
- Biblical infallibility
- Clarity of Scripture
- Internal consistency of the Bible
- General revelation
- Progressive revelation (Christianity)
- Thought inspiration
- Verbum Domini – apostolic exhortation of the Pope Benedict XVI
