= Development of doctrine =

Evolution of Catholic doctrine

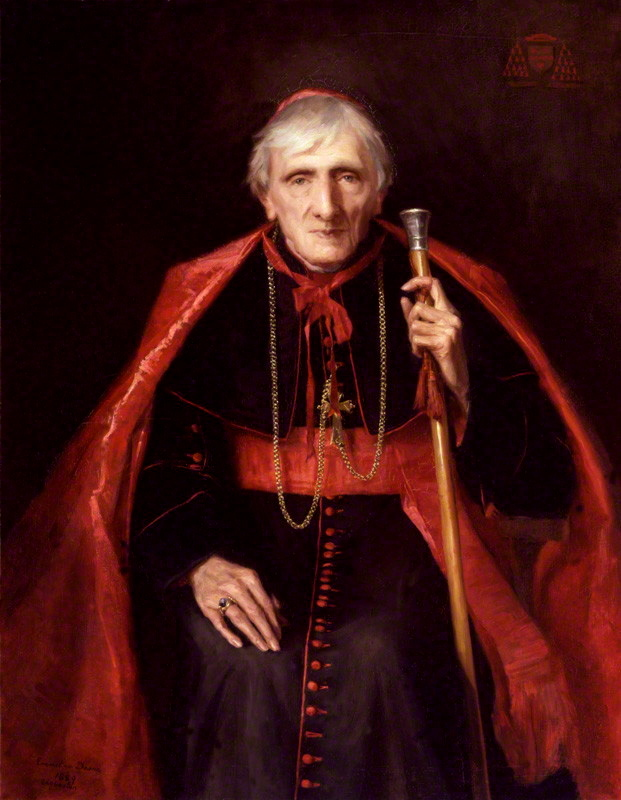
John Henry Newman, who introduced the term

Development of doctrine is a term used by philosopher John Henry Newman and other theologians influenced by him to describe the way Christian teaching has become more detailed and explicit over the centuries, while later statements of doctrine remain consistent with earlier statements.

== Precursors ==
In the 16th century, Erasmus controversially suggested, from historical evidence, the reality of the development of doctrine in some important areas: examples being papal supremacy ("I have never doubted about the sovereignty of the Pope, but whether this supremacy was recognised in the time of St. Jerome, I have my doubts") and the Trinity and filioque ("We (now) dare to call the Holy Spirit true God, proceeding from the Father and the Son, which the ancients did not dare to do.").

== Newman's formulation ==
The term was introduced in Newman's 1845 book An Essay on the Development of Christian Doctrine.

He argued that various Catholic doctrines not accepted by Protestants (such as devotion to the Blessed Virgin Mary, or Purgatory) had a developmental history analogous to doctrines that were accepted by Protestants (such as the Trinity or the divinity and humanity of Christ). Such developments were, in his view, the natural and beneficial consequences of reason working on the original revealed truth to draw out consequences that were not obvious at first. This thinking of Newman had a major impact on the Bishops at the Second Vatican Council, and appears in their statement that

There is a growth in the understanding of the realities and the words which have been handed down. This happens through the contemplation and study made by believers, who treasure these things in their hearts (see Luke 2:19, 51) through a penetrating understanding of the spiritual realities which they experience, and through the preaching of those who have received through Episcopal succession the sure gift of truth.

G.K. Chesterton characterized the Development of Doctrine as:

When we say that a puppy develops into a dog, we do not mean that his growth is a gradual compromise with a cat; we mean that he becomes more doggy and not less. Development is the expansion of all the possibilities and implications of a doctrine, as there is time to distinguish them and draw them out;...

— G.K. Chesterton, Ch I, St Thomas Aquinas, 1933

== As distinct from evolution of dogmas ==
There is a more radical understanding of development of doctrine that is known as evolution of dogmas. This view, mixed in with philosophical currents such as vitalism, immanentism and historicism, was at the heart of the modernist controversy during the papacy of Pius X, and was condemned in the encyclical Pascendi dominici gregis. Although modernist intellectuals such as George Tyrrell and Alfred Loisy did at times cite the influence of Newman's ideas on their thinking, their goal was not so much to understand the ancient roots of Church doctrine but to make it change meaning, according to their own ideas in the liberal spirit of the times.

== Eastern Orthodoxy ==
Archpriest Oleg Davydenkov wrote:

This theory is very convenient for Western Christians, because it makes it easy to justify arbitrary dogmatic innovations of both the Roman Catholic Church and Protestant denominations. On the one hand, this theory seems quite logical, but on the other — it leads to paradoxical conclusions. In this case, we will have to admit, for example, that the Church of the time of the apostles and even the holy apostles themselves knew incomparably less about God than any modern Christian who attended a course of dogmatics. Naturally, it is impossible to agree with such an understanding of the problem

Daniel Lattier has argued that some older Eastern Orthodox thinkers did not reject the concept outright, and that Eastern Orthodoxy may allow a form of doctrinal development, albeit more limited than Western forms of it.

== See also ==
- Grammar of Assent
- Probabiliorism
- Progressive revelation (Christianity)
