= Philomena =

Virgin martyr and saint

Saint Philomena
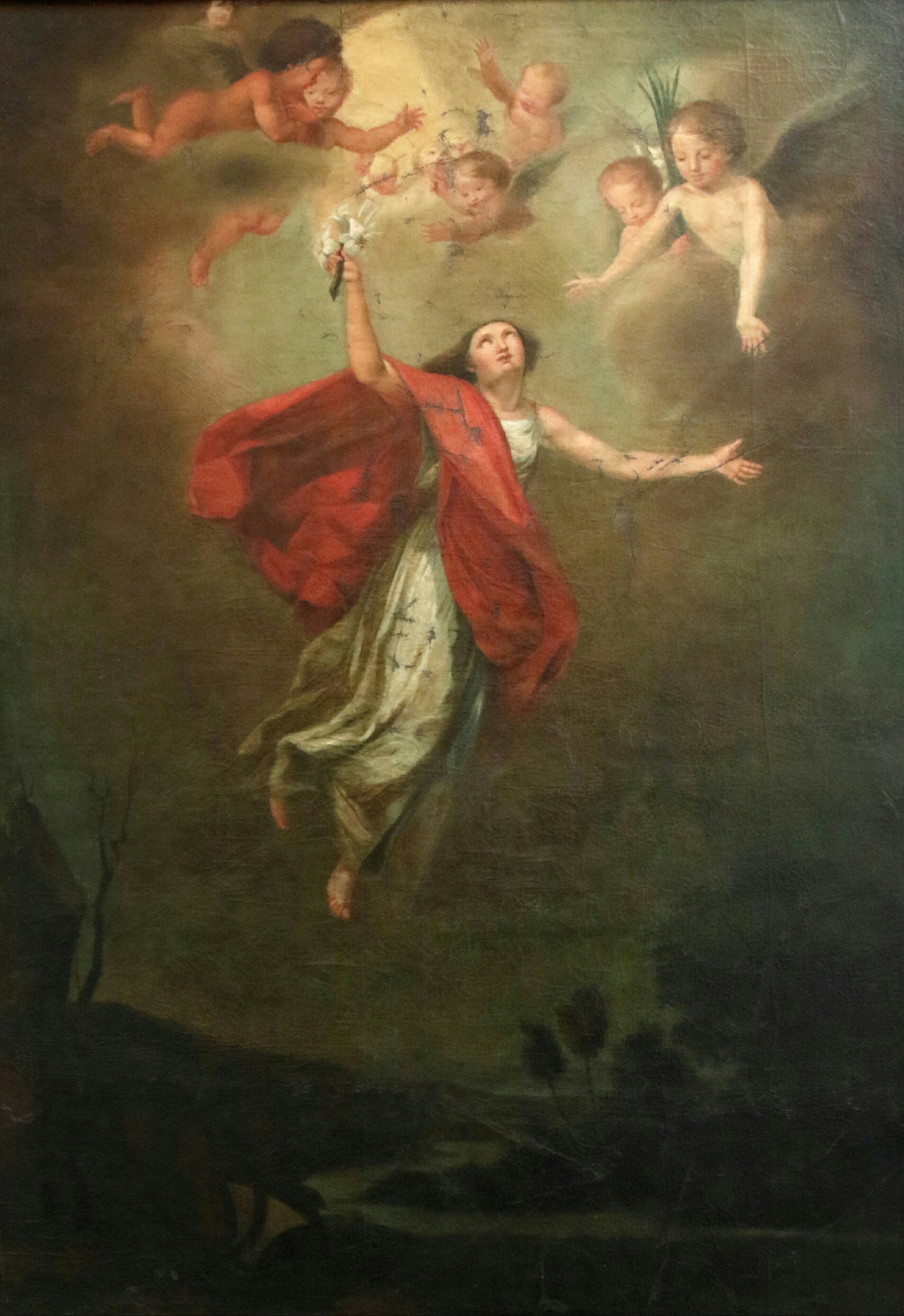
- The Triumph of Saint Philomena of Rome

Virgin and martyr
- Born: c. 10 January 291; Greece
- Died: c. 10 August 304 (aged c. 13); Rome, Italy
- Cause of death: Capital punishment by drowning
- Venerated in: Catholic Church; Coptic Orthodox Church
- Major shrine: Sanctuary of Saint Philomena in Mugnano del Cardinale
- Feast: 11 August (Catholic); 4 Misra (Coptic Orthodox)
- Attributes: Martyr's palm, crown of both white and red roses, arrows, anchor, sometimes a partially slit throat

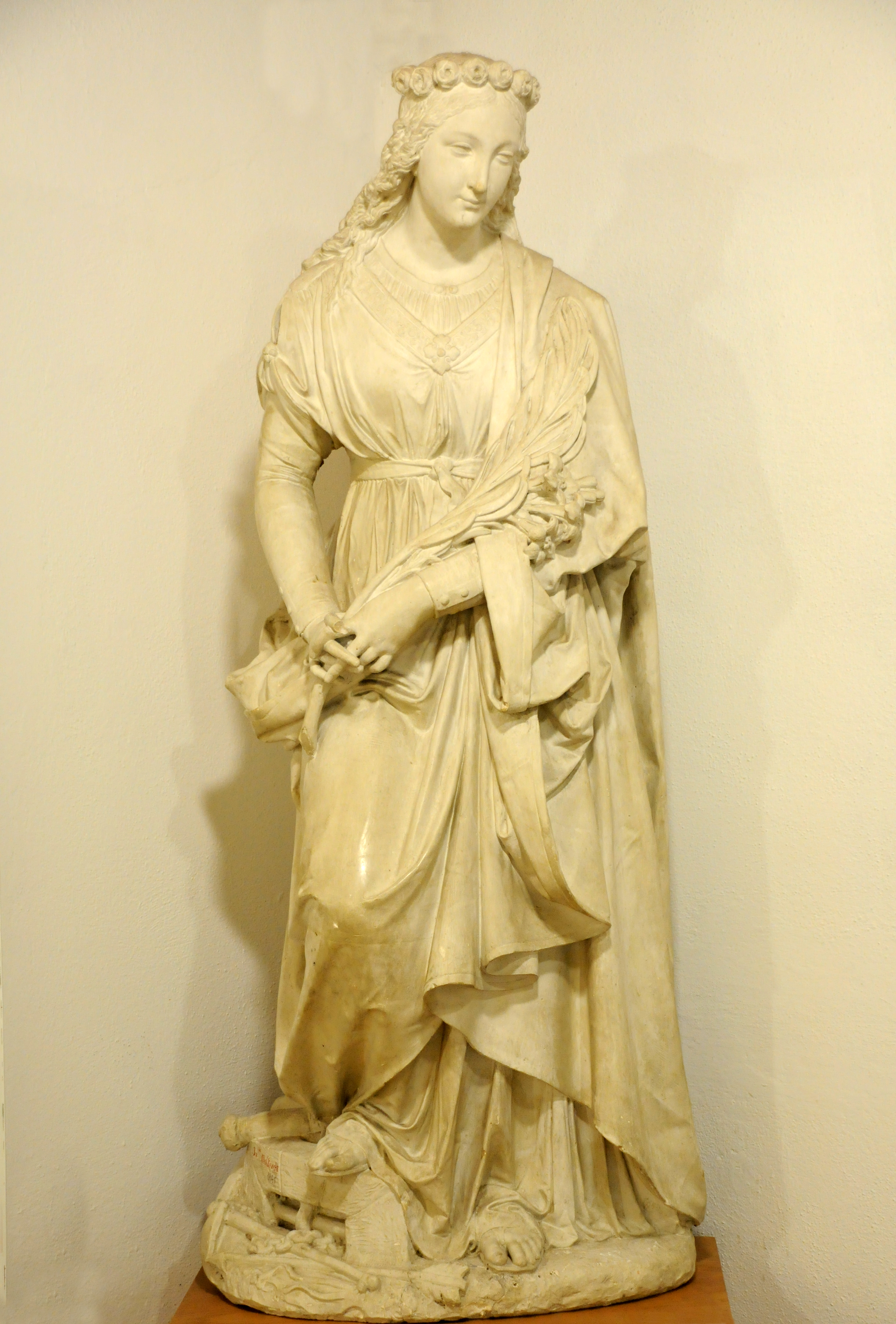
Saint Philomena with attributes: palm branch, whip, anchor and arrows. Plaster cast by Johann Dominik Mahlknecht in the Museum Gherdëina in Urtijëi, Italy.

Philomena (/ˌfɪləˈmiːnə/ FIL-ə-MEE-nə), also known as Saint Philomena (Ancient Greek: Ἁγία Φιλουμένη, romanized: Hagía Philouménē; Modern Greek: Αγία Φιλομένα, romanized: Agía Filoména) or Philomena of Rome (c. 10 January 291 – c. 10 August 304) was a Greek virgin martyr whose remains were discovered on 24–25 May 1802, in the Catacomb of Priscilla. Three tiles enclosing the tomb bore an inscription, Pax Tecum Filumena (i.e. "Peace be unto you, Philomena"), that was taken to indicate that her name (in the Latin of the inscription) was Filumena (Ancient Greek: φιλουμένη, romanized: philouménē, lit. 'beloved'), the English form of which is Philomena. Philomena is the patron saint of babies, infants, and youth, and is known as "The Wonderworker". Although never formally canonized in the Catholic Church, Philomena is venerated by devotees in the Catholic and Coptic Orthodox Churches; while both Churches have churches and shrines dedicated to her.

The remains were moved to Mugnano del Cardinale in 1805. There, they became the focus of widespread devotion; several miracles were credited to Philomena's intercession, including the healing of Pauline Jaricot in 1835, which received wide publicity. John Vianney attributed to her intercession the extraordinary cures that others attributed to him.

From 1837 to 1961, celebration of her feast day was approved for regional calendars, but was never included in the General Roman Calendar. The 1920 typical edition of the Roman Missal included a mention of her, under 11 August, in the section headed Missae pro aliquibus locis ("Masses for some places"), with an indication that the Mass to be used in those places was one from the common of a virgin martyr, without any proper.

== Biography ==
On 21 December 1833, the Holy Office declared that there was nothing contrary to the Catholic faith in the revelations that Maria Luisa di Gesù, a Dominican tertiary from Naples, claimed to have received from Philomena herself.

According to Maria Luisa di Gesù, Philomena told her she was the daughter of a king in Greece who, with his wife, had converted to Christianity. At the age of about 13, she took a vow of virginity for Christ's sake. When the Emperor Diocletian threatened to make war on her father, her father went with his family to Rome to ask for peace. The Emperor "fell in love" with the young Philomena and, when she refused to be his wife, subjected her to a series of torments: scourging, from whose effects two angels cured her; drowning with an anchor attached to her (two angels cut the rope and raised her to the river bank); and being shot with arrows (on the first occasion her wounds were healed; on the second, the arrows turned aside; and on the third, they returned and killed six of the archers, after which several of the others became Christians). Finally, the Emperor had her decapitated. The story goes that the decapitation occurred on a Friday at three in the afternoon, as with the death of Jesus. The two anchors, three arrows, the palm, and the ivy leaf on the tiles found in the tomb were interpreted as symbols of her martyrdom.

In the Neapolitan tertiary's account, Philomena also revealed that her birthday was 10 January, that her martyrdom occurred on 10 August (the date also of the arrival of her relics in Mugnano del Cardinale), and that her name "Filumena" meant "daughter of light" (from Latin "filia" and "lumen"; however, it is usually taken to be derived from Greek φιλουμένη philouménē (hence Latin "u" for "ου") meaning "beloved"). Publication of this account gave rise to critical study both of the account itself and of the many archaeological finds, leading to uncertainty that her supposed tomb was in fact that of a martyr.

== Discovery of her remains ==
On 24 May 1802, in the Catacombs of Priscilla on the Via Salaria Nova, an inscribed loculus (a space hollowed out of the rock) was found, and on the following day it was carefully examined and opened. The loculus was closed with three terracotta tiles on which was the following inscription: lumena paxte cumfi. It was and is generally accepted that the tiles had not been positioned in the sequence of the words and that the inscription originally read, with the leftmost tile placed on the right: pax tecum Filumena ("Peace with you, Philomena"). The skeleton of a female between thirteen and fifteen years old was found within the loculus. Embedded in the cement was a small glass vial with vestiges of what was taken to be blood. By the assumptions of the time, the remains were taken to be those of a virgin martyr named Philomena.

The belief that such vials were signs of the grave of a martyr was rejected by the investigations of Giovanni Battista De Rossi (1822–1894), but more recently this original view has found advocates, such as theologian Mark Miravalle.

In 1805, Canon Francesco De Lucia of Mugnano del Cardinale requested relics for his oratory and, on 8 June, obtained the remains discovered in May 1802 (then reduced to dust and fragments). The relics arrived in Mugnano on August 10, and were placed in the Church of Our Lady of Grace. A new Church of Our Lady of Grace was built, containing a chapel to which the sacred relics were moved on 29 September 1805.

In 1827, Pope Leo XII gave the church in Mugnano del Cardinale the three inscribed terracotta slabs taken from the tomb.

== Veneration ==
=== Catholic Church ===
==== Spread and Devotion ====
In his Relazione istorica della traslazione del sagro corpo di s. Filomena da Roma a Mugnano del Cardinale, written in 1833, Canon De Lucia recounted that wonders accompanied the arrival of the relics to his church: among them a statue that sweated some liquid continuously for three days. A miracle accepted as proved in the same year was the multiplication of the bone dust of the saint which provided for hundreds of reliquaries without the original amount experiencing any decrease in quantity.

Devotion to Philomena includes the wearing of the "Cord of Philomena", a red and white cord, which had a number of indulgences attached to it, including a plenary indulgence on the day on which the cord was worn for the first time, indulgences that were not renewed in Indulgentiarum doctrina, the 1967 general revision of the discipline concerning them. There is also the chaplet of Saint Philomena, with three white beads in honour of the Christian Trinity and thirteen red beads in honour of the thirteen years of Philomena's life. A sacramental associated with devotion to Philomena is the Oil of Saint Philomena, used for the putative healing of the body and soul.

In August 1876, the first issue of Messenger of Saint Philomena was published in Paris, France. On 6 October 1876, Louis Petit, a priest, founded the Confraternity of Saint Philomena in Paris. In November 1886, the Confraternity was raised to the rank of Archconfraternity by Pope Leo XIII. On 21 May 1912, Pope Pius X raised it to the rank of Universal Archconfraternity with the Apostolic brief Pias Fidelium Societates stating that: "The current statements (regarding St. Philomena) are and remain always fixed, valid and effective; in this way it has to be judged as normative; and if it is proceeded in another way, it will be null and void, whatever its authority."

==== Veneration by Saints ====
- The spread of devotion to her in France and Italy was helped when John Vianney built a shrine in her honour and referred to her often, attributing to her the miracles that others attributed to him.
- Another help was the cure of the near-dying Pauline Jaricot, founder of the Society for the Propagation of the Faith, at Philomena's shrine on August 10, 1835. On July 6 1835, the Miracle of Giovanna Cescutti took place in Venice.
- Damien of Molokai, who had an intense devotion to Philomena, named his church at Kalawao in honor of her.
- Many other saints were devoted to Philomena, including Peter Julian Eymard, Peter Chanel, Pio of Pietrelcina, Anthony Mary Claret, Madeleine Sophie Barat, Euphrasier Pelletier, John Neumann, and Anna Maria Taigi.

==== Liturgical Observance ====
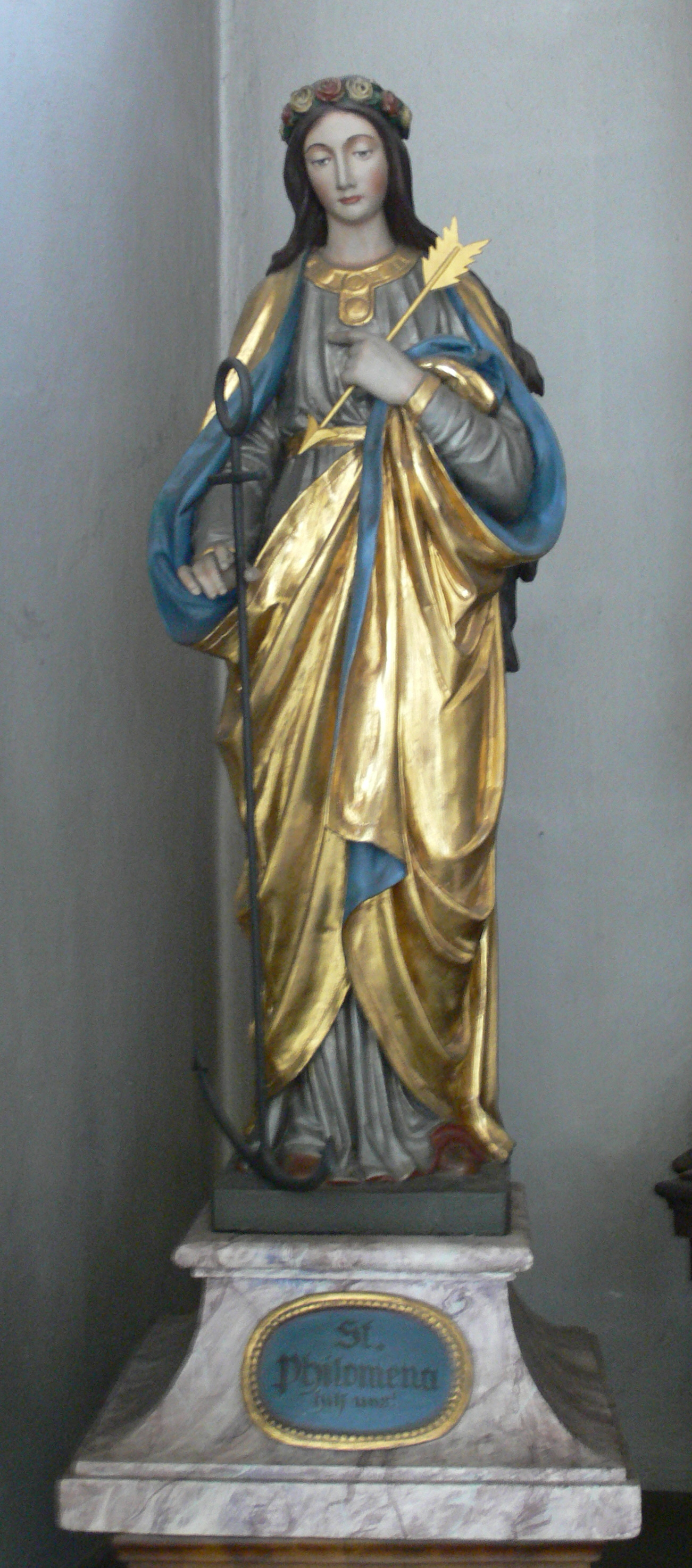
Statue of Saint Philomena in the Church of Our Lady ("Obere Pfarre") in Bamberg

In 1834, due to many supposed miracles, Pope Gregory XVI allowed the veneration of Saint Philomena and, in 1837, authorized the celebration of the feast of Saint Philomena on 11 August or, according to another source, 9 September, first in the Diocese of Nola (to which Mugnano del Cardinale belongs), and soon in several other dioceses in Italy.

The name "Philomena" was not included in the Roman Martyrology in which venerated persons are included immediately upon beatification or canonization. In the 1920 typical edition of the Roman Missal, Philomena is mentioned under 11 August with an indication that the Mass for her feast day was to be taken entirely from the common liturgy.

On 14 February 1961, the Holy See ordered that the name of Philomena be removed from all liturgical calendars. This order was given as part of an instruction on the application to local calendars of the principles enunciated in the 1960 Code of Rubrics that had already been applied to the General Roman Calendar. Section 33 of this document ordered the removal from local calendars of fourteen named feasts but allowed them to be retained in places with a special link to the feast. It then added: "However, the feast of Saint Philomena, virgin and martyr (11 August), is to be removed from all calendars."

=== Coptic Orthodoxy ===
Devotion and veneration to Philomena is present among members of the Coptic Orthodox Church. In November of 2007, Metropolitan Marcos of the French Coptic Orthodox Church brought fragment attributed to Philomena to the Convent of St. George in Old Cairo. And in 2018, clergy of the Coptic Orthodox Church ceremonially perfumed relics attributed to Philomena in the Church of the Virgin Mary in Qena.

In 2020, El-Fagr reported that two Coptic devotees had appealed to Pope Tawadros II of Alexandria and the Holy Synod to recognize Saint Philomena's sainthood. Their appeals also requested to include her life in the Synaxarion, to include her name in the Commemoration, and to consecrate Altars in her name. On 25 March 2021, Tawadros presided at the Divine Liturgy at the Monastery of St. Victor in Khatatba, and consecrated the main altar of the Monastery's Church of the Martyr Philomena in Philomena's name. The Monastery observes her feast annually on 4 Misra of the Coptic Calendar. In 2026 Anba Sawerous, Bishop and Abbot of the Monastery, presided at Vespers on the eve of the feast. The Church of Our Lady the Virgin and the Martyr Philomena in Haram City also identifies Philomena as a patron of the church, and takes 4 Misra as the date of her commemoration.

There is also a Coptic Orthodox Children's home in Suva, Fiji, named for Philomena.

=== Places dedicated to Saint Philomena ===
==== Catholic Church ====
- Sanctuary of St. Philomena, Mugnano del Cardinale, Avellino, Italy, which houses her remains within a life-size, richly robed effigy
- St. Philomena's Cathedral (India)
- St. Philomena's Church (Cincinnati, Ohio)
- St. Philomena's Church (Pittsburgh, PA)
- St Philomena's Catholic High School for Girls
- St Philomena’s Catholic Church (Lansdowne, PA)
- St. Philomena's Roman Catholic Church (Franklinville, New York)
- Sanctuary of St. Philomena (Sorocaba, Brazil)
- St. Philomena's Catholic Church and School (Peoria, Illinois)
- St. Philomena's Catholic Church (Monticello, Illinois)
- St Philomena Catholic Church (Chicago, Illinois)
- Sacred Shrine of Ss. Peter, Paul and Philomena (New Brighton, England)

==== Coptic Orthodoxy ====
- Church of the Martyr Philomena, Monastery of St. Victor (Khatatba, Egypt)
- Church of Our Lady the Virgin and the Martyr Philomena (Haram City, Egypt)
- Shrine of St. Philomena, Convent of St. George (Old Cairo, Egypt)
- St. Philomena Coptic Orthodox Children’s Home (Suva, Fiji)

=== In art ===
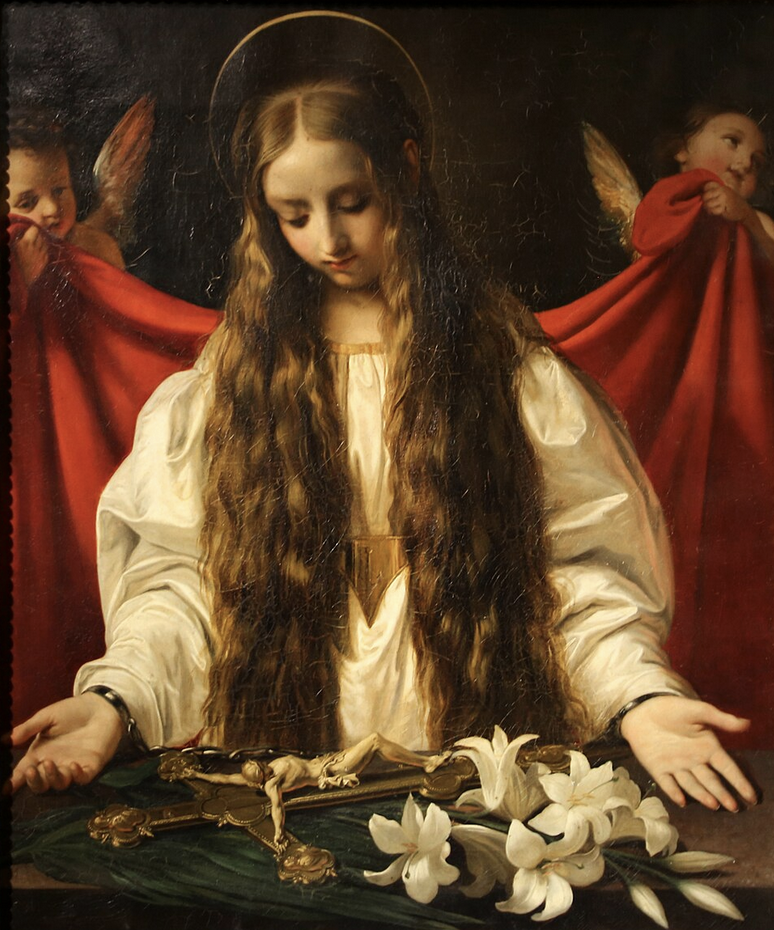
Giuseppe Bezzuoli, Santa Filomena (1840)

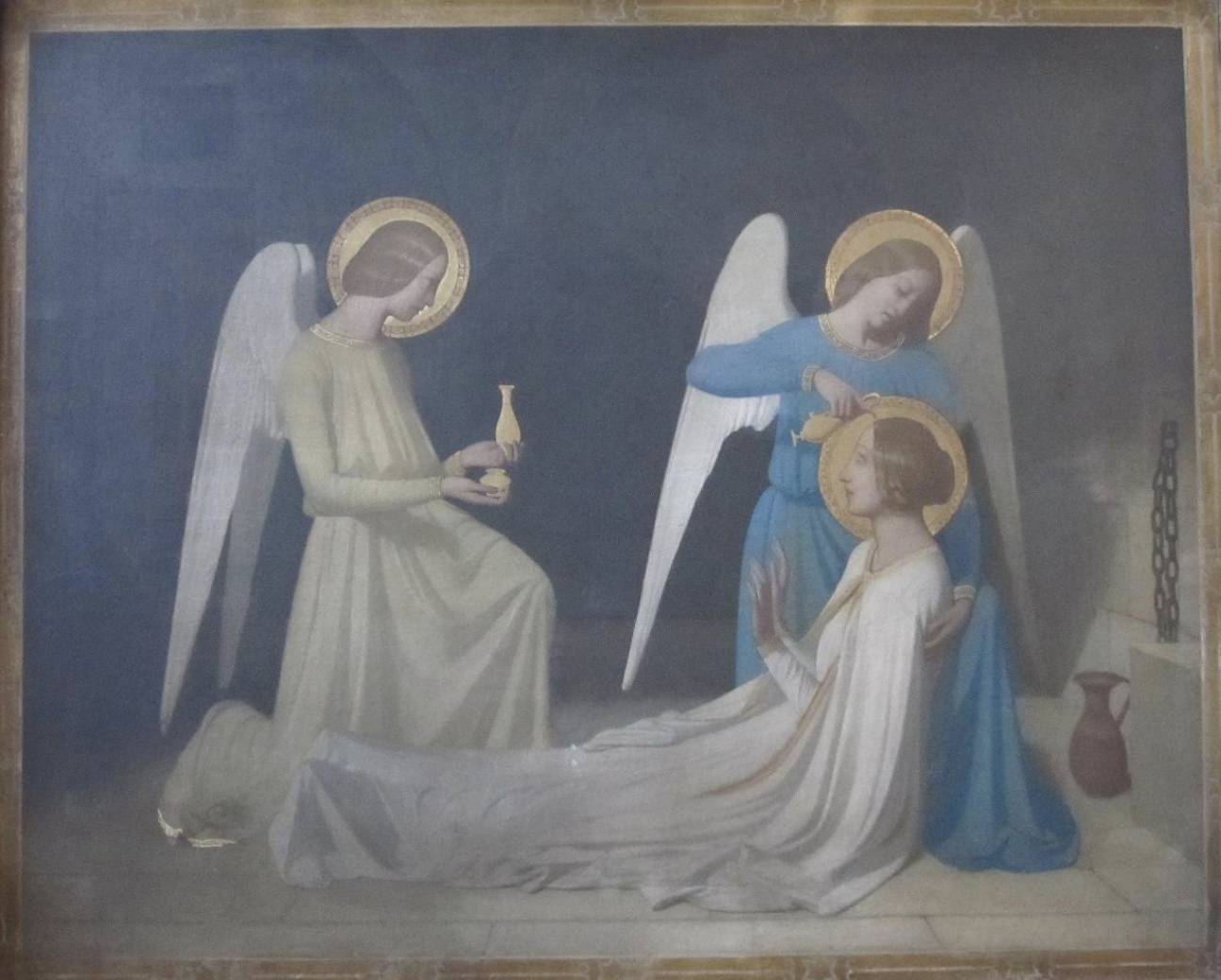
Amaury-Duval, Saint Philomena (1844)

== Criticism ==
Although correlation does not prove causation, the Holy See's instruction to remove the name of Philomena even from local calendars followed the raising of questions by certain scholars, whose interest had been drawn to the phenomenon more especially in connection with the revelations of Sister Maria Luisa di Gesù. The questions were raised in particular by Orazio Marucchi, whose study in the late 19th Century won the support of Johann Peter Kirsch, an archaeologist and ecclesiastical historian who is the author of the 1911 article on Philomena in the Catholic Encyclopedia. Orazio Marucchi had argued that the inscription on the three tiles that had provided the Latin name "Filumena" belonged to the middle or second half of the second century, while the body that had been found was of the fourth century, when the persecutions of Christians had ended. Thus, on his theory, not only the name but also the leaf, the two anchors and the palm that decorated the three tiles, and which had been believed to indicate that Filumena was a martyr, had no relation to the person whose remains were found. The alleged disarrangement of the tiles would be explained by a fourth-century practice of re-using materials already engraved, with the aim of indicating that it was not the same person who was now buried in the place.

More recently, Mark Miravalle has argued that Marucchi's conclusions should not be taken as the final word on the historicity of St. Philomena. His book, It Is Time to Meet St. Philomena, cites several specialists who disagree with Marucchi's conclusions. Historian Michael S. Carter (who supports Miravalle's position) has written about devotion to Saint Philomena within the broader context of veneration of "catacomb martyrs" and their relics in the history of the United States. Moreover, In April 2005, at the Conference of Philomenian Studies – 1805-2005, findings of a study carried out on the tiles by the Opificio delle Pietre Dure e Laboratori di Restauro (Factory of Hard Stones and Restoration Laboratories) of Florence were made public. The analysis confirmed that only one type of mortal lime could be found on the tiles, thus giving strong support to the theory that the tiles had not been re-arranged.

Others stress that the authenticity of her cult can be grounded on account of the miracles attributed to her, its long-standing papal approbation, and the saint's continued popularity. This has been the position of the rector of the shrine in Mugnano del Cardinale and the view presented in the Italian-language Enciclopedia Dei Santi. Pilgrims from all over the world arrive continually at Philomena's shrine in the Diocese of Nola, Italy, displaying an intense degree of popular devotion.

The website of "The National Shrine of Saint Philomena, Miami, Florida" (associated with the SSPX, a group excommunicated by the Catholic Church) sees "the action taken in 1960 as the work of the devil in order to deprive the people of God of a most powerful Intercessor, particularly in the areas of purity and faith at a time when these virtues were so much being challenged as they continue to be up until now!"

== Bibliography ==
- Marie Helene Mohr, SC, Saint Philomena, Powerful with God, Rockford, IL: TAN Books and Publishers, Inc, 1988.
- Philomena in David Hugh Farmer, The Oxford Dictionary of Saints, (Oxford University Press, 2004) ISBN 0-19-860949-3
- Mark Miravalle, Present Ecclesial Status of Devotion to St. Philomena, (Queenship Publishing, 2002) ISBN 1-57918-228-3 (also on Internet: see below)
- Cecily Hallack, Saint Philomena: Virgin martyr and wonderworker. Dublin, Ireland; Anthonian Press, 1936
- Alfonso Ramos, Santa Filomena: Princesa del cielo. Chihuahua, Mexico; Ultimo Sello, 2013.
- Michael S. Carter, Glowing With the Radiance of Heaven: Roman Martyrs, American Saints, and the Devotional World of Nineteenth-Century American Catholicism in U.S. Catholic Historian, Volume 36, Number 1 (Winter 2018), pp. 1–26
