= Sanctuary of Saint Philomena =

Catholic building in Mugnano del Cardinale, Italy

Sanctuary of Saint Philomena Santuario di Santa Filomena
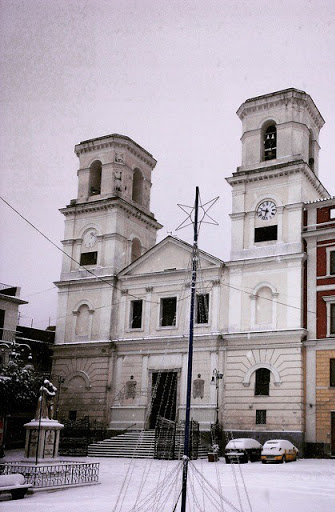
- Façade of the Sanctuary

Religion
- Affiliation: Roman Catholic
- Province: Diocese of Nola
- Year consecrated: 1805

Location
- Location: Mugnano del Cardinale, Italy
- Interactive map of Sanctuary of Saint Philomena; Santuario di Santa Filomena
- Coordinates: 40°56′38″N 14°38′11″E

Architecture
- Type: Church
- Direction of façade: S-W

Website
- www.santuariosantafilomena.it

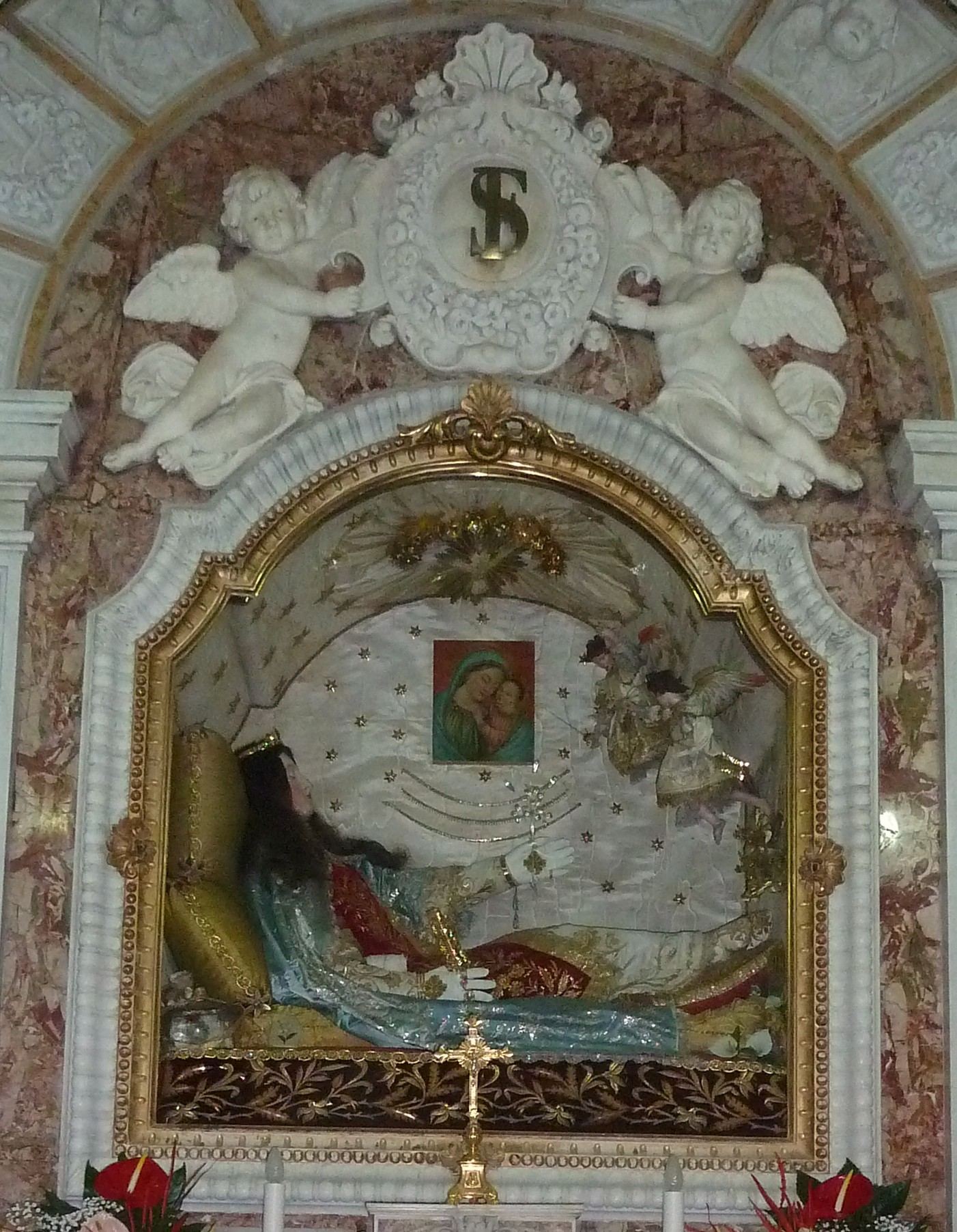
The urn with the Holy Body of Saint Philomena

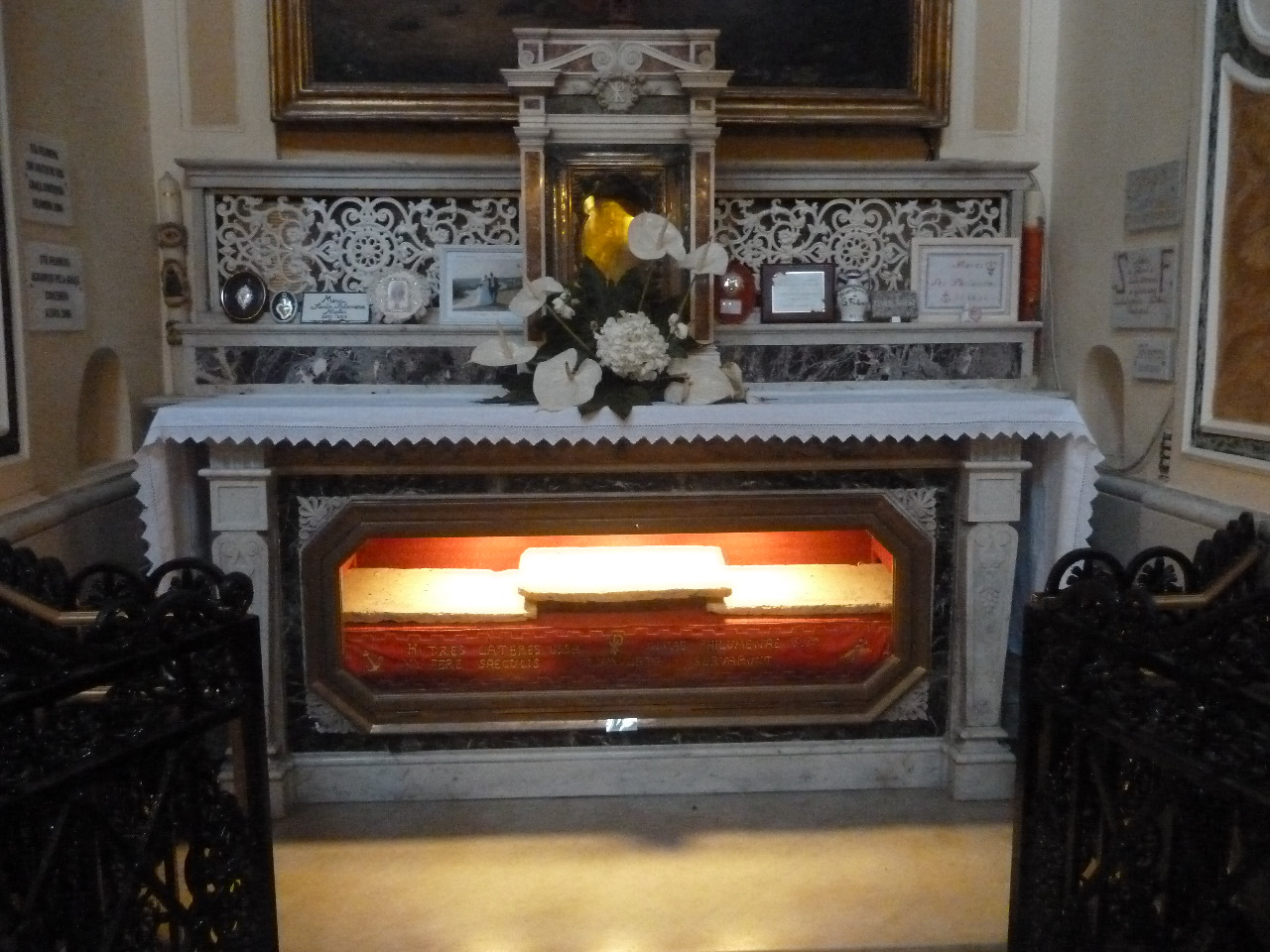
The altar where the tombstones of Philomena are kept, donated to the Sanctuary in 1827

The Sanctuary of Saint Philomena (Italian: Santuario di Santa Filomena) is the main Catholic place of worship in Mugnano del Cardinale, in the province of Avellino. Inside, the remains of Saint Philomena have been kept since August 10, 1805. It is one of the nine sanctuaries of the Diocese of Nola.

== History ==
The construction of the building began in 1580 by the municipality of Mugnano del Cardinale. The construction ended in 1600 and was named after Our Lady of Graces. The founder of the Sanctuary was Father Francesco De Lucia, born in Mugnano del Cardinale on September 19, 1772. Before entering the priesthood, he taught philosophy in the House of Iliceto, the novitiate of the religious of Alphonsus Liguori. After priestly ordination, on September 19, 1796, he settled in Naples, where he opened a school of philosophy and literature; in the capital of The Kingdom of the Two Sicilies, De Lucia was highly esteemed by some notable figures, including Bartolomeo De Cesare, future Bishop of Potenza, and Joseph Pignatelli, restorer of the Society of Jesus. In 1805, De Lucia went to Rome to accompany the Bishop of Potenza, Bartolomeo De Cesare, on a visit to Rome on behalf of Ferdinand IV of Naples. On this occasion, thanks to De Cesare, he obtained the remains of Saint Philomena from Pope Pius VII, found in the Catacomb of Priscilla together with a small glass phial believed to contain the blood of Philomena. The niche was closed by three tiles on which the following words were read: LUMENA | PAX TE | CVM FI, with the symbols of the lily, the palm and the anchor; the tiles were given on July 11, 1827, to the Shrine by Pope Leo XII. Back in Naples, with the presence of the Bishop of Nola Vincenzo Torrusio, the remains were placed in a statue of a girl covered in clothes donated by Angela Terres. They left Naples on the evening of August 9 to return to Mugnano on the morning of August 10, when the remains were placed in the Our Lady of Graces Church. In September 1805, De Lucia donated the remains to the municipality of Mugnano del Cardinale who in turn donated it to King Ferdinand II of the Two Sicilies on April 22, 1836, together with the church itself.

The first statue of Saint Philomena, donated in 1806 by the Cardinal of Naples Luigi Ruffo Scilla

In 1806, the Cardinal of Naples Luigi Ruffo-Scilla gave the Sanctuary the first statue dedicated to the saint. On August 10, 1835, the miracle of the healing of Pauline Jaricot, founder of the Work of the Propagation of the Faith, took place in the Sanctuary. Pope Gregory XVI witnessed that miracle, who decided to give public worship to Saint Philomena on January 30, 1837.
