= Fractio Panis =

Artwork in Ancient Rome

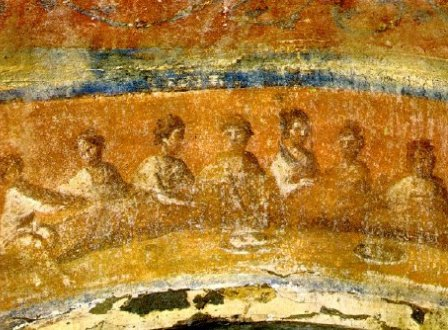
Fractio panis, in the Catacombs of Rome

Fractio Panis (English: Breaking of Bread) is the name given to a fresco in the Greek Chapel (Capella Greca) in the Catacomb of Priscilla, situated on the Via Salaria Nova in Rome. The fresco depicts seven persons at a table, possibly all women, due to the long skirts (men's wouldn't come past the calf), veil, and all of their upswept hair. The Vatican declares it to be six men and a woman. Like the whole of the decorations of the chapel, the fresco dates from the first half of the 2nd century. The painting is found upon the face of the arch immediately over the altar tomb, upon which the sacrament of the Eucharist was performed.

== Discovery ==
By chance this particular fresco, having been covered by a thick crust of stalactites, escaped the notice of the early explorers of the catacombs. In 1893, Jesuit art historian Joseph Wilpert, one of a band of young scholars who looked upon De Rossi as their master, arrived at the conclusion that the roof and arches of this chapel were decorated with frescoes. Chemical reagents were used to remove the crust which covered the surface, and by the patient care of Wilpert this delicate operation was attended with complete success. De Rossi described it as "the pearl of Catacomb discoveries". Wilpert published a monograph in 1895 giving a full account of this discovery under the title Fractio Panis, die alteste Darstellung der eucharistischen Opfers (Freiburg in Breisgau). This was translated into French the next year. It contains a collection of very carefully executed photogravures of the frescoes in the Capella Greca.

The scene represented is a picture of seven persons at a table, six men and a woman. It seems clear that six of these are reclining as the ancients reclined at their meals. But the seventh personage, a bearded and impressive figure, sits somewhat apart at the extremity of the table. His head is thrown back, he has a small loaf or cake in his hands, and his arms stretched out in front of him show that he is breaking it. Upon the table immediately before him is a two-handled cup. Further along the table there are two large plates, one containing two fishes, the other five loaves. At each extremity of the picture upon either side are baskets filled with loaves—four baskets at one end, three at the other.

== Interpretation ==
The phrase "fractio panis" (Greek: klasis tou artou) and its variants is not found in pagan literature but recurs frequently in early Christian literature, indicating particular Christian usage; not only is the "blessing and breaking" of the bread mentioned in each of the four accounts of the Last Supper, but repeatedly also in the other Apostolic writings. For example, in 1 Corinthians, 10:16, "The cup of benediction, which we bless, is it not the communion of the blood of Christ? And the bread, which we break, is it not the partaking of the body of the Lord?" So again in Acts, 2:42, "And they were persevering in the doctrine of the apostles and in the communication of the breaking of bread, and in prayers" (cf. Acts, 2:46). And particularly Acts, 2:7, "And on the first day of the week, when we were assembled to break bread", where this practice is closely associated with the observance of Sunday. (Cf. also the disciples at Emmaus on Easter Day—Luke 24:30-35, and Acts, 27:35).

Similar prominence is given to this conception in other sub-Apostolic writings, notably in the Didache or "Teaching of the Apostles" (xiv, I), where it is associated with the observance of the Sunday as well as with the explicit mention of Sacrifice and with confession. "And on the Lord's day come together and break bread and give thanks, having first confessed your transgressions, that your sacrifice may be pure." Further, in ch. xi of the same early treatise the consecrated Host is clearly designated by the term klasma, i.e. "broken bread". It seems natural then that, in the earliest form of the liturgy, the breaking of the bread should have been regarded as the climax of the ritual employed. This Eucharistic significance of the picture is borne out by all the accessories. The loaves and the fishes upon the table point directly to the feeding of the multitude twice performed by Jesus Christ. The association of this miracle with the Eucharist is familiar, not only in other archaeological monuments, but also in early Christian literature.

Regarding the symbolic significance of the fish and the anagram ichthys, both the Inscription of Abercius of the close of the 2nd century and that of Autun a little later, as well as the large number of allusions in early Christian literature, make it clear that Christ was indicated by this symbol. Moreover, the Abercius inscription clearly conveys that this "great fish" was to be the permanent food of the soul. The one unambiguously female guest depicted in the Fractio Panis fresco is veiled, which is not the case with the female figures represented in those other banqueting scenes found in the catacombs and usually interpreted as symbolic of the joys of heaven.

A number of scholars, including Karen Jo Torjesen, Joan Morris, Dorothy Irvin, and Nicola Denzey Lewis, argue that most or all of the figures depicted are women, citing their hairstyles and clothing. They sometimes interpret this as archaeological evidence that women presided over the Eucharist in the early Church.

The 1913 Catholic Encyclopedia argues that some parts of the fresco should be understood as symbolic rather than realistic, such as the seated position of the person breaking the bread. A further indication of the Eucharistic significance of the fresco is afforded by the fact that in the fresco next to it in the same chamber is depicted the Binding of Isaac. On the other side is a representation of Daniel in the lions' den, to which Wilpert also attaches a Eucharistic significance on account of the supernatural feeding of Daniel through the intervention of the prophet Habakkuk (Daniel, 14:36).
