= Mark Miravalle =

American theology professor (born 1959)

Mark Miravalle (born 1959) is an American professor of theology at Franciscan University of Steubenville, specializing in Mariology. He is president of Vox Populi Mariae Mediatrici, a Catholic movement promoting the concepts of the Blessed Virgin Mary as Mediatrix and Co-Redemptrix.

== Life ==
Mark Miravalle was born in 1959 in San Francisco, where he attended Catholic schools. He made his undergraduate studies in theology as a student in the St. Ignatius Institute (Catholic Great Books program) of the University of San Francisco. Miravalle was married in 1981. He continued his studies at the Pontifical University of St. Thomas Aquinas Angelicum in Rome where he earned a Licentiate of Sacred Theology and a Doctor of Sacred Theology. In 1984 he and his wife made a pilgrimage to Medjugorje. The following year, Miravalle wrote his doctoral dissertation on The message of Medjugorje : a post conciliar formulation of Lourdes and Fatima on the message of the Marian apparitions at Medjugorje.

== Career ==
As of 2009, Miravalle holds the rank of Professor of Theology at Franciscan University, where he has taught since 1986, and where he has received several teaching awards. His areas of specialization are Mariology and spiritual theology. In 2018, Miravalle was named St. John Paul II Chair of Mariology at Franciscan University.

=== Mariological activities ===
Miravalle is a member of the Mariological Society of America and the Ecumenical Society of the Blessed Virgin Mary, U.S.A. In the preface to Miravalle's book Introduction Mary Cardinal Edouard Gagnon stated that Mark Miravalle is "internationally renowned for his unquestioned fidelity to the Church's Magisterium and for his outstanding scholarship".

Miravalle is president of Vox Populi Mariae Mediatrici, a Roman Catholic movement which seeks the solemn papal definition of the Spiritual Maternity of the Mother of God, the Blessed Virgin Mary, as Co-Redemptrix, Mediatrix of All Graces, and Advocate for the People of God.

Miravalle has given numerous international lectures in Mariology, has addressed several Catholic bishops' conferences, and has served members of the episcopal hierarchy with preliminary investigations for reported apparitions.

Miravalle publishes a bi-monthly Marian e-zine, Mother of All Peoples.

=== Media appearances ===
Miravalle has made numerous appearances on Catholic television and radio for EWTN, the Apostolate for Family Consecration, National Family Catholic Radio, and Air Maria, the media project of the Franciscan Friars of the Immaculate.

He has been interviewed for CNN Latin America, BBC, Fox News, and the NBC series Dateline.

== Works ==
Mark Miravalle has written and edited numerous books and articles in the areas of Mariology and Marian private revelation. He is also a contributor to National Catholic Register and Inside the Vatican.

=== Articles ===
- New Catholic Encyclopedia, entry “Medjugorje,” 1989

=== Books ===
- The Message of Medjugorje: The Marian Message to the Modern World, University Press of America, 1985
- Heart of the Message of Medjugorje, Franciscan University Press, 1988
- Medjugorje and the Family, Helping Families to Live the Message, Franciscan University Press, 1991
- Mary: Coredemptrix, Mediatrix, Advocate, Queenship Publishing, 1993
- Mary, Coredemptrix, Mediatrix, Advocate: Theological Foundations II, Queenship Publishing, 1997
- The Dogma and the Triumph, Queenship Publishing, 1998
- Contemporary Insights on a Fifth Marian Dogma: Mary Co-redemptrix, Mediatrix, Advocate, Theological Foundations III, Queenship Publishing, 2000;
- Mary Co-redemptrix: Doctrinal Issues Today, Queenship Publishing, 2002
- Present Ecclesial Status of Devotion St Philomena, Queenship Publishing, 2002;
- In Continued Dialogue with the Czestochowa Commission, Queenship Publishing, 2002;
- "With Jesus": The Story of Mary Co-redemptrix, Queenship Publishing, 2003;
- Introduction to Mary: The Heart of Marian Doctrine and Devotion, Queenship Publishing, 2006;
- Private Revelation: Discerning with the Church, Queenship Publishing, 2007
- The Seven Sorrows of China, Queenship Publishing, 2007
- Meet Mary: Getting to Know the Mother of God, Sophia Institute Press, 2008
- Mariology: A Guide for Priests, Deacons, Seminarians, and Consecrated Persons, Queenship Publishing, 2008 (editor)

== See also ==
- Co-Redemptrix
- Roman Catholic Mariology
