= Nicola Denzey Lewis =

Canadian religion scholar

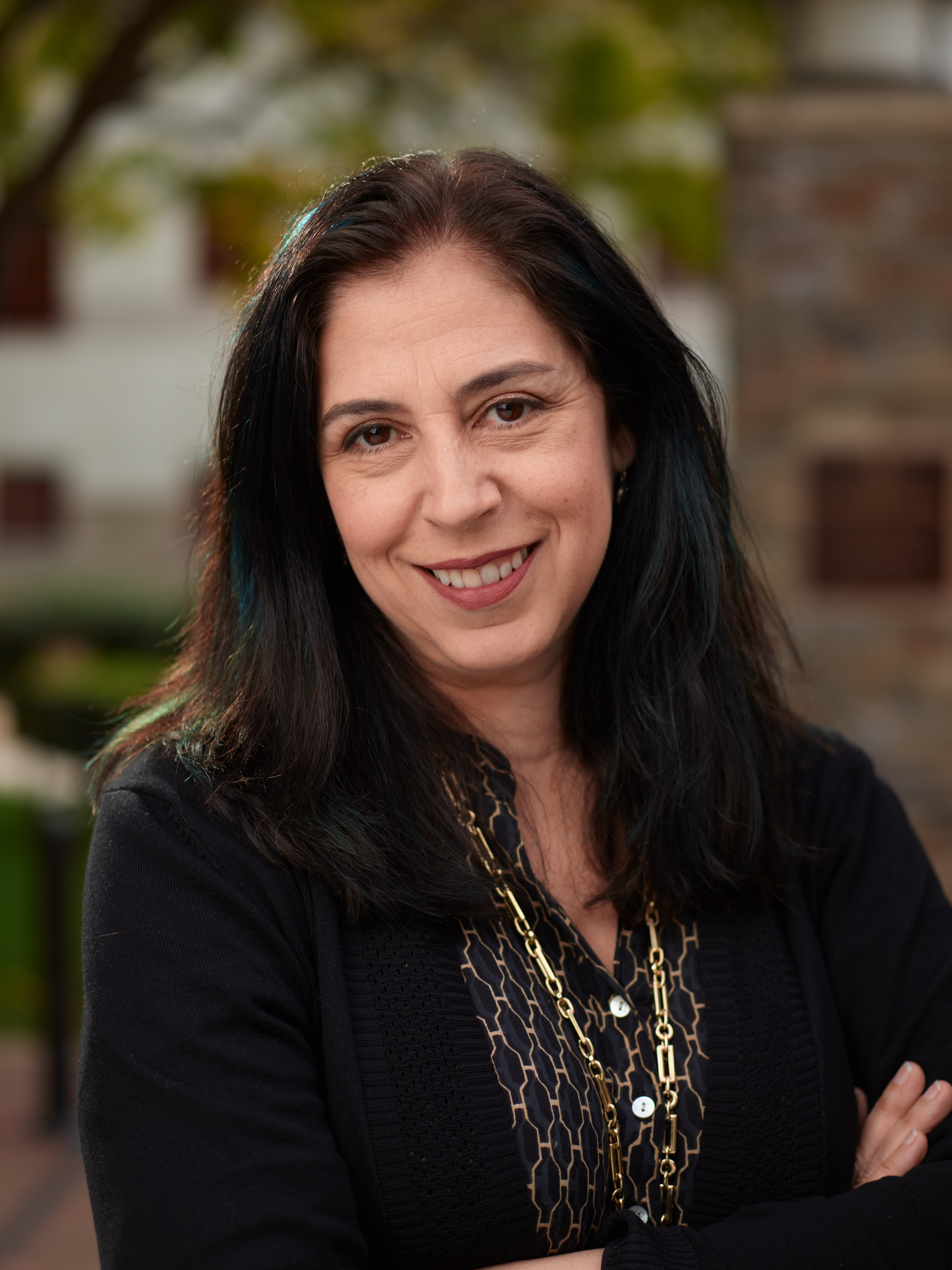
- Occupation: Margo L. Goldsmith Chair of Women's Studies in Religion at Claremont Graduate University

Academic background
- Education: Princeton University
- Doctoral advisor: Peter Brown Elaine Pagels

Nicola Denzey Lewis (born 1966 in Toronto, Ontario) is a Canadian academic of lived religion, early Christians, material culture of late antique Roman Empire, and women studies. She is a professor of classics at Cornell University and was previously at Claremont Graduate University as the Margo L. Goldsmith Chair in Women's Studies in Religion.

== Education and background ==
=== Education ===
Lewis completed her Bachelor of Arts in religious studies at the University of Toronto. After receiving a 5-year graduate fellowship from the Andrew W. Mellon Foundation (1991-1996), she went on to earn both a Master's degree and a Doctorate from Princeton University, focusing on early Christianity. At Princeton, she received a dual training in the history of late antiquity with Peter Brown, and in gnosticism with Elaine Pagels. At Princeton, she also participated in the Program in the Ancient World, working to develop skills in history, classics, religion, and art and archaeology.

=== Career ===
Lewis began her teaching career at Bowdoin College, before moving to Skidmore College in 1998. After four years at Skidmore, she resigned from her position to raise a family. In 2004-2005, Denzey Lewis accepted a research associate position at Harvard Divinity School in their Women Studies in Religion Program, followed by more teaching at Harvard University. She moved to Brown University in 2007. During her time at Brown, Denzey Lewis published three books: The Bone Gatherers (Boston: Beacon, 2007), which was shortlisted for best first book in Religion by the American Academy of Religion; Cosmology and Fate in Gnosticism and Graeco-Roman Antiquity (Boston: Brill, 2013); and the first textbook/introductory handbook to Nag Hammadi texts, Introduction to “Gnosticism”: Ancient Voices, Christian Worlds (New York: Oxford University Press), which was subsequently translated into Italian.

In 2017, Lewis was appointed to the Margo L. Goldsmith Chair in Women’s Studies in Religion at Claremont Graduate University, where she directs the program in Women and Gender Studies in Religion. She served as department chair from 2018 to 2020. Her numerous, other, shorter published studies cover various topics, including ancient women, Christian movements previously deemed “Gnosticism,” and life and death in Roman antiquity. Denzey Lewis serves on the board of the International Catacomb Society, the journals Gnosis, the Journal of Early Christian Studies, and the Zeitschrift für Antikes und Christentums. She has served in various positions in the Society for Biblical Literature, including many years developing and writing for the SBL’s Bible Odyssey project. She is a director of the Virtual Teaching and Learning Center for the American Academy of Religion and editor of the Teaching and Learning Center.

=== Awards and honors ===
Lewis has received fellowships and honors from, among others, Yale University’s Gilder Lehrman Center for the Study of Slavery, Resistance, and Abolition; the American Academy of Religion; and Harvard Divinity School. In 2007, she was awarded a Derek Bok Award for Teaching Excellence at Harvard University. She received two year-long fellowships from The American Council of Learned Societies (ACLS) (2015-2016) and the National Endowment for the Humanities (NEH) (2016-2017). She has received the Norman E. Wagner Prize for Teaching and Technology from the Canadian Society of Biblical Studies.

=== Public scholarship ===
Lewis has appeared on a number of television and radio programs that have aired on the BBC, Channel 4 (UK), CNN, the National Geographic Channel, and the History Channel. Her first appearance was in a National Geographic series, “When Rome Ruled”. She consulted on, and was featured in, two seasons of CNN’s “Finding Jesus” where she traveled to London, Berlin, and Cairo in search of early Christian writings; she continued working with the team that developed “Finding Jesus” to be featured in the History Channel series “Jesus: His Story.”

== Selected publications ==
=== Books ===
- The Early Modern Invention of Late Antique Rome. Cambridge: Cambridge University Press, 2020. ISBN 978-1108471893
- Cosmology and Fate in Gnosticism and Graeco-Roman Antiquity: Under Pitiless Skies. Leiden: Brill, 2013. ISBN 978-9004245488
- Introduction to “Gnosticism”: Ancient Voices, Christian Worlds. New York: Oxford University Press, 2013. ISBN 978-0199755318
- The Bone Gatherers: The Lost Worlds of Early Christian Women. Boston: Beacon Press, 2007. ISBN 978-0807013090
