= Catacomb of Priscilla =

Archaeological site in Rome, Italy

- Catacumba Priscillae (Latin)
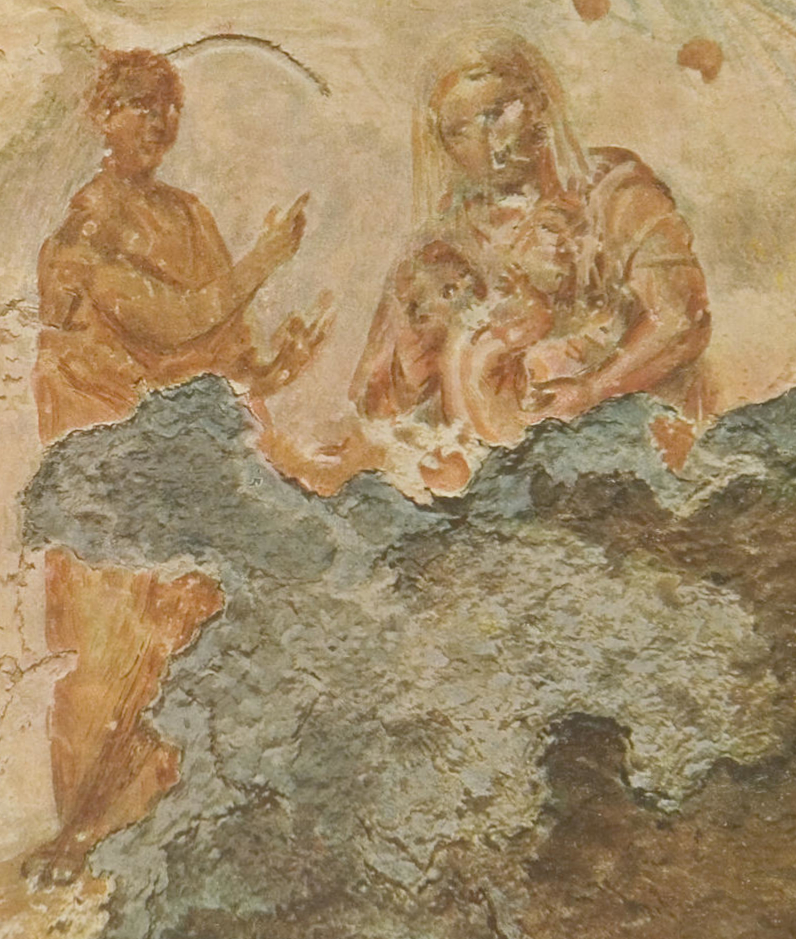
- Isaiah (left) predicts the birth of the Messiah from the Virgin. Mary is shown nursing the Infant Jesus. Dated to the first half of the third century, likely 230-240 CE, Catacomb of Priscilla.

- Location in Rome, Italy
- Click on the map to see marker.
- 41°55′47″N 12°30′31″E
- Type: Catacomb
- Periods: Late Roman Empire
- Cultures: Early Christian
- Location: Via Salaria, Rome, Italy
- Region: Lazio

History
- Built: Late 2nd century AD
- Built by: Early Christian community
- Abandoned: After the 4th century AD

Site notes
- Material: Tufa rock
- Excavation dates: 19th century
- Archaeologists: Giovanni Battista de Rossi; Josef Wilpert
- Discovered: Known continuously
- Owner: Holy See
- Management: Pontifical Commission for Sacred Archaeology
- Public access: Yes

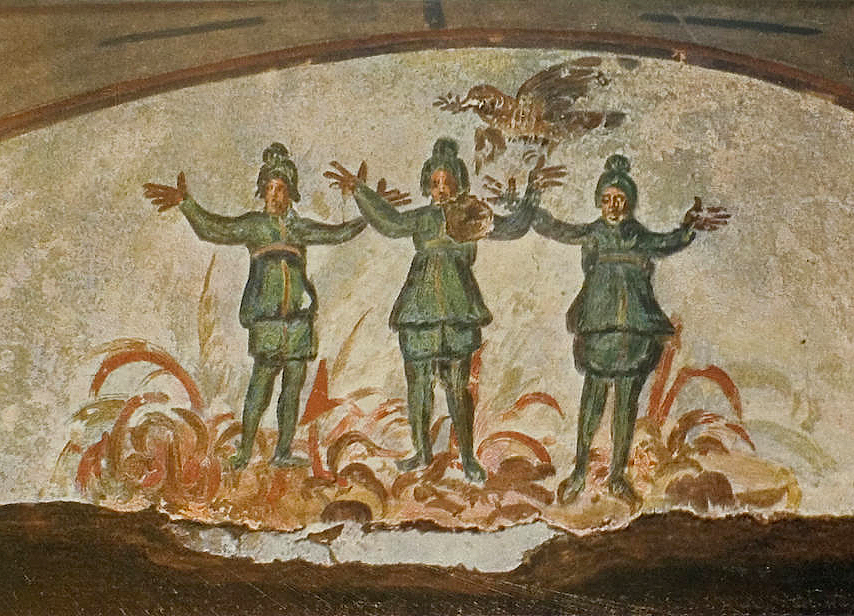
Shadrach, Meshach, and Abednego in the fiery furnace

The Catacomb of Priscilla is a large archaeological site on the Via Salaria in Rome, Italy, situated in what was a quarry in Roman times. The catacombs extend underground for over seven miles, making them one of Rome's most extensive catacombs. it was used for thousands of Christian burials from the late 2nd century through the 4th century. The origin of the catacomb's namesake is highly contested and theorized. In one theory, Priscilla belonged to the Acilii Glabriones family and was the woman patron who donated the site. The family name can be found etched into the hypogeum.

The walls also display some of the earliest known frescos of Biblical scenes. Many of these frescos are studied specifically for their portrayal of early Christian women.

The modern entrance to the catacombs are on the Via Salaria through the cloister of the monastery of the Benedictines of Priscilla. The Catacombs of Priscilla are divided into three notable areas: a Greek Chapel (Capella Greca), the cryptoporticus, and the tombs.

== Artworks ==
There are popular interpretations of the artwork found in the catacombs, but the contents of each painting are highly contested by scholars.

External videos
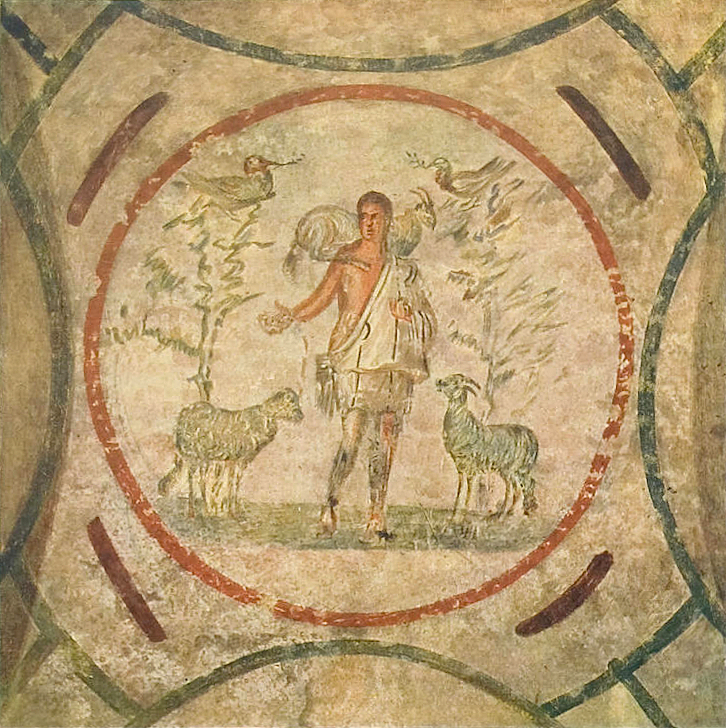
- Catacomb of Priscilla, Rome, 11:03, Smarthistory

The wall paintings in this catacomb include images of saints and early Christian symbols, such as the painting reproduced in Giovanni Gaetano Bottari's folio of 1754, where the Good Shepherd is depicted as feeding the lambs, with a crowing cock on his right and left hand.

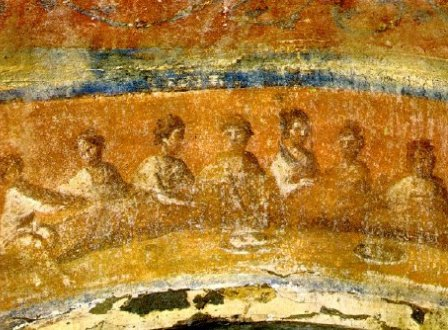
Fractio Panis

Particularly notable is the "Greek Chapel" (Capella Greca), a square chamber excavated by Commendatore Giovanni Batista De Rossi (1822-1894) and his protégé, Josef Wilpert. The chapel contains many 3rd century frescoes generally interpreted to be Old and New Testament scenes, including the Fractio Panis. The appearance of the figures in the Fractio Panis insinuate that most, if not all, could be women.

Another famous fresco on the walls depicts what scholars believe to be the earliest surviving illustration of Susannah and the Elders (Daniel 13). Susannah is painted in the orans pose and the fresco stands at around two feet tall. New, and somewhat controversial research has begun to suggest that the scenes traditionally interpreted as the deuterocanonical story of Susannah (Daniel 13) may actually be scenes from the life of a prestigious Christian woman of the 2nd century AD.

Near this are figures of the Madonna and Child and the Prophet Isaiah, also dating from the early 3rd century. The Priscilla catacombs may contain the oldest known Marian paintings, from the early third century. Mary is shown with Jesus on her lap, and the catacombs may have a depiction of the Annunciation, though the latter has been disputed.

A fresco of a figure and a lion is argued to be either of David or Thecla due to the feminine appearance and singular lion.

Other notable paintings include the story of Daniel 3, Moses, rising of Lazarus, Mary Magdalene (John 20), and the Cubiculum of the Velata which consists of three portraits that depict the life of a singular unnamed woman.

=== Cubiculum of the Velata ===
These images have more than one interpretation. One possibility: Image 2, a bishop veils a consecrated virgin; image 3, the same virgin praying in orans; image 4, the Virgin Mary with Jesus.

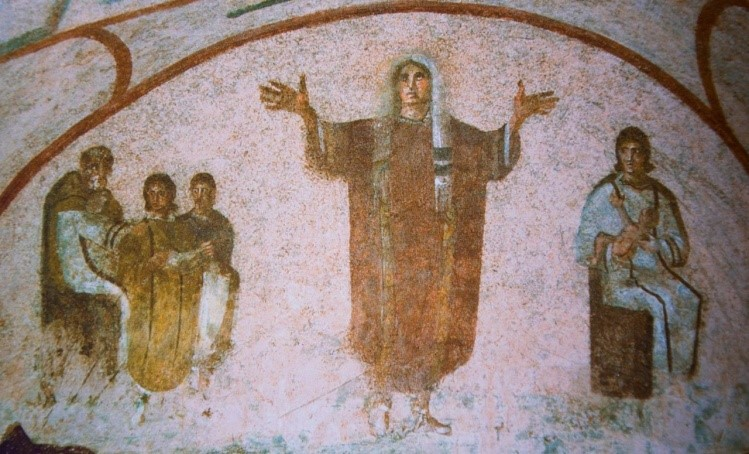
One interpretation: the images in succession illustrate each of the three stages of a woman's life in the 3rd century A.D.

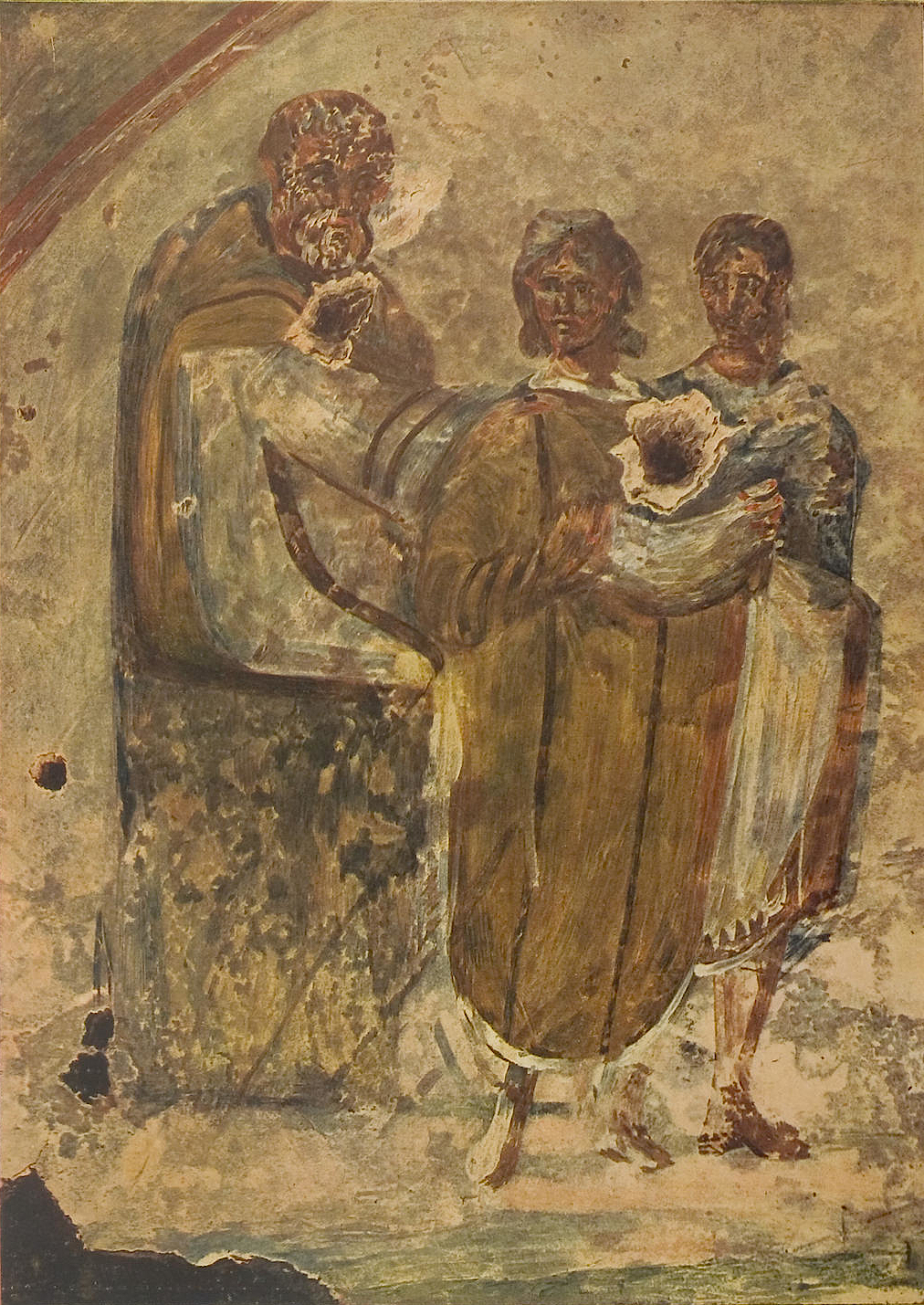
Stage one - Childhood: A man presents the garment of a consecrated virgin to two children, one of whom is a girl.

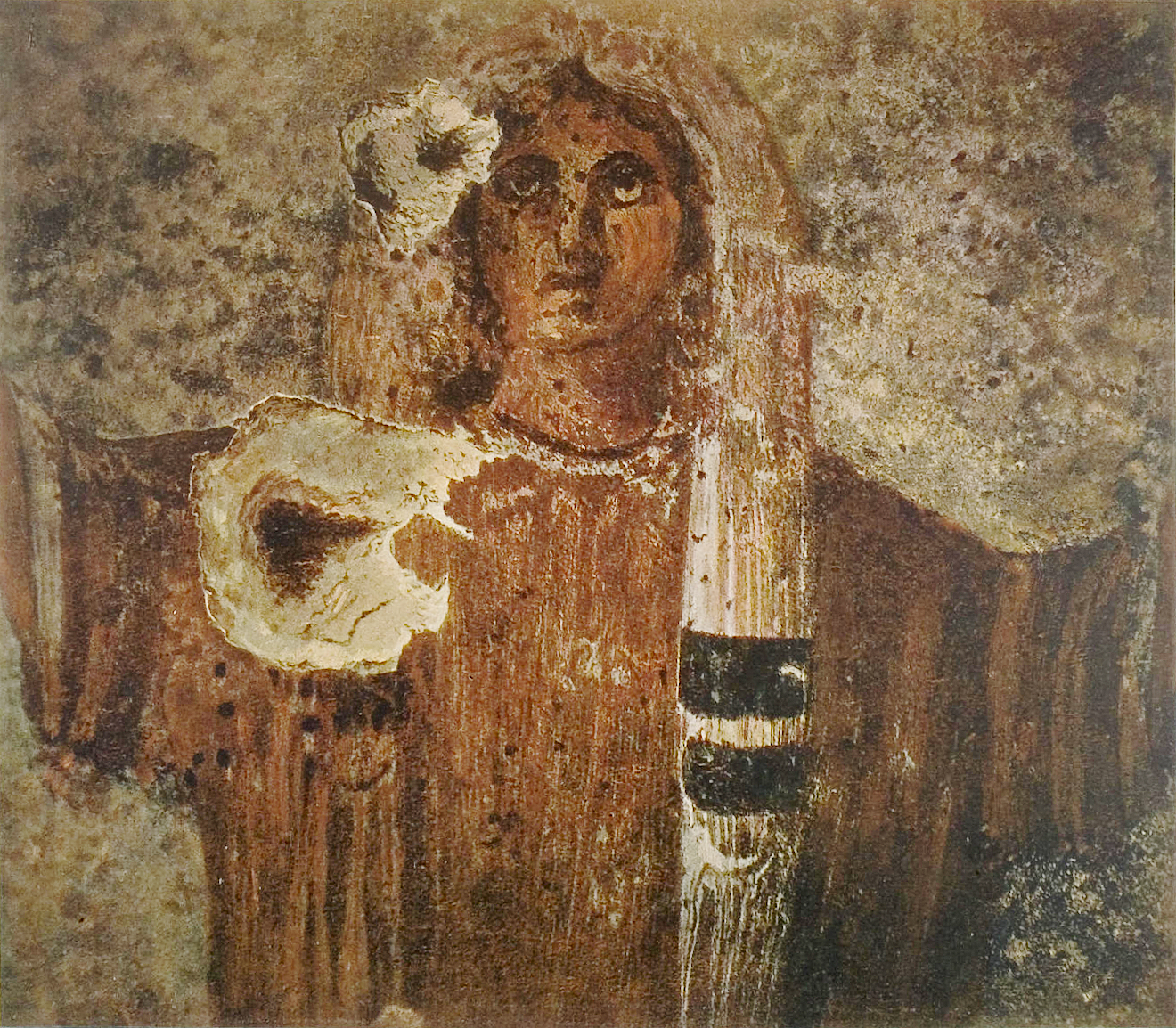
Stage two - Consecration: the girl is depicted as a consecrated virgin, praying in the orante pose.

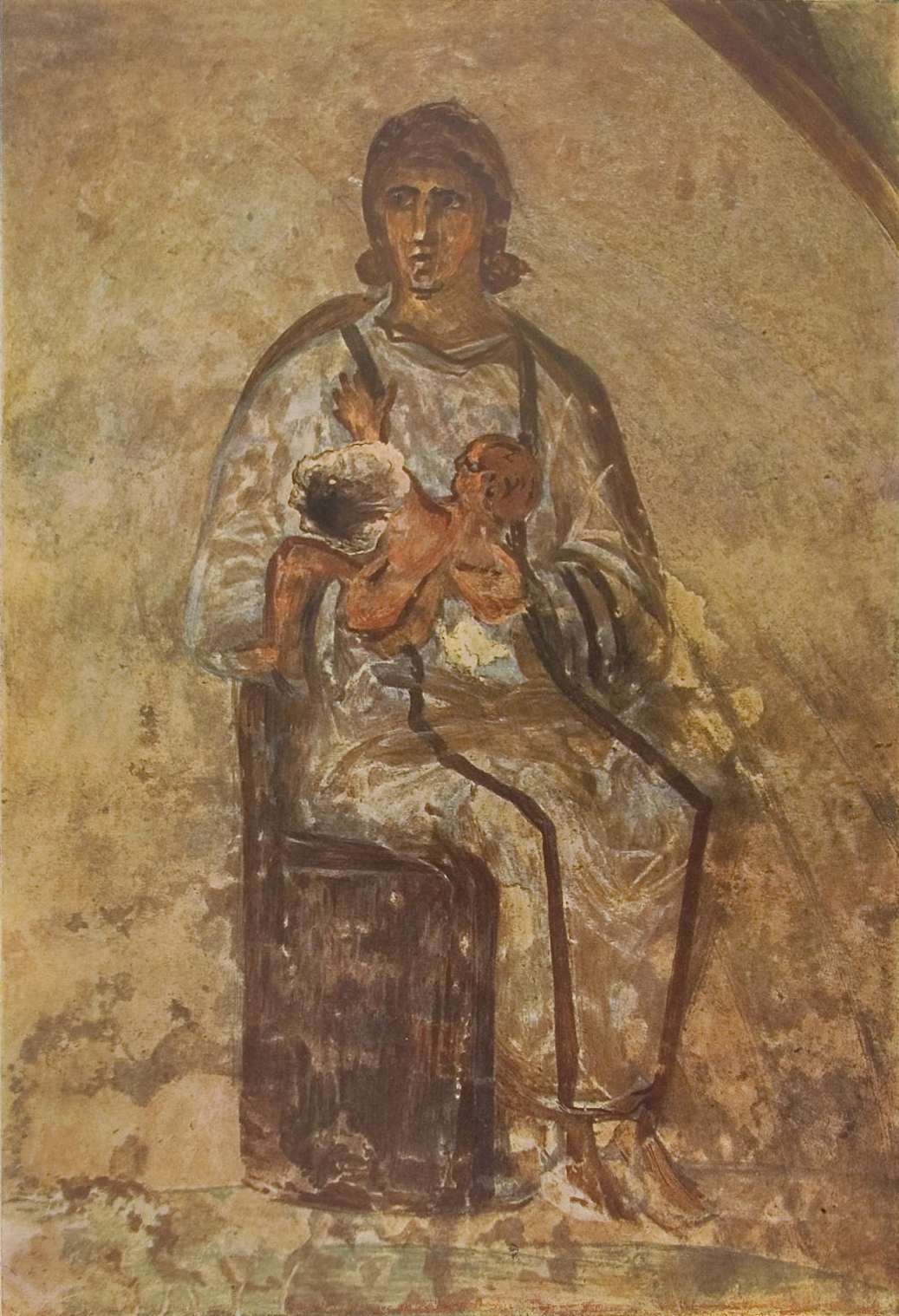
Stage three - Motherhood: The consecrated virgin is depicted holding a child, symbolizing motherhood. This image has also been interpreted as representing the Virgin Mary and Jesus.

== Tombs ==
Historical guidebooks state that seven early popes and more than three hundred martyrs were buried in the cemetery. Due to the number of martyrs housed, it was known as the "Queen of the Catacombs" in antiquity. Two known popes were buried in the Catacomb of Priscilla: Pope Marcellinus (296-304) and Pope Marcellus I (308-309). Their martyrdom was represented in the iconographies made by order of the Popes Damasus, Siricius, Celestine and Virgilius.

Alleged relics of Popes Sylvester I, Stephen I, and Dionysius were exhumed and enshrined beneath the high altar of San Martino ai Monti (founded as Santi Silvestro e Martino ai Monti), in the Esquiline area of Rome. Pope Sylvester I was likely originally buried in San Martino ai Monti, although some sources say his remains were transferred there. An unidentified papal sarcophagus discovered during the demolition of Old Saint Peter's Basilica was attributed to Sylvester I and moved to Nonantola Abbey, near the altar that contains the remains of Pope Adrian III. Other sources describe a combination of Sylvester I and Vigilius in an altar in St. Peter's.

According to Catholic tradition, remains belonging to Saint Philomena were found on May 24–25, 1802, in the catacombs. They have since been relocated to Mugnano del Cardinale.

The bones of Saints Praxedes and Pudentiana were contained in the catacomb until they were moved in the 9th century by Pope Paschal I to be housed in the rebuilt Santa Prassede.

== Other relics and inscriptions ==
A chalcedony phalerae and other objects made of rock, crystal, and glass found in the catacomb are believed to come from the Kushan Empire through trade. It is believed these objects act as amulets.

Many inscriptions dedicated to widows (χήρα) of the church can be found in the catacomb. One of the inscriptions is about a widow called The Mother Reina (Regina). The wording used in the dedication associates her with a position of power within her church.

== Sources ==
- Reardon, Wendy J. 2004. The Deaths of the Popes. Macfarland & Company, Inc. ISBN 0-7864-1527-4
