= Orazio Marucchi =

Italian archaeologist (1852–1931)

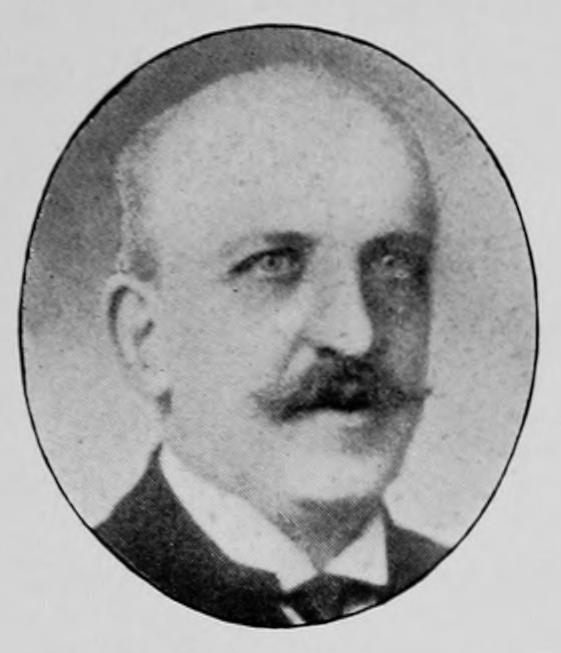

Orazio Marucchi (1852 - January 1931, Rome) was an Italian archaeologist and author of the Manual of Christian Archaeology. He served as Professor of Christian Archaeology at the University of Rome and director of the Christian and Egyptian museums at the Vatican Museums. He was also a member of the Pontifical Commission of Sacred Archaeology and was a scrittore of the Vatican Library.
