= Catholic Marian church buildings =

Type of religious building

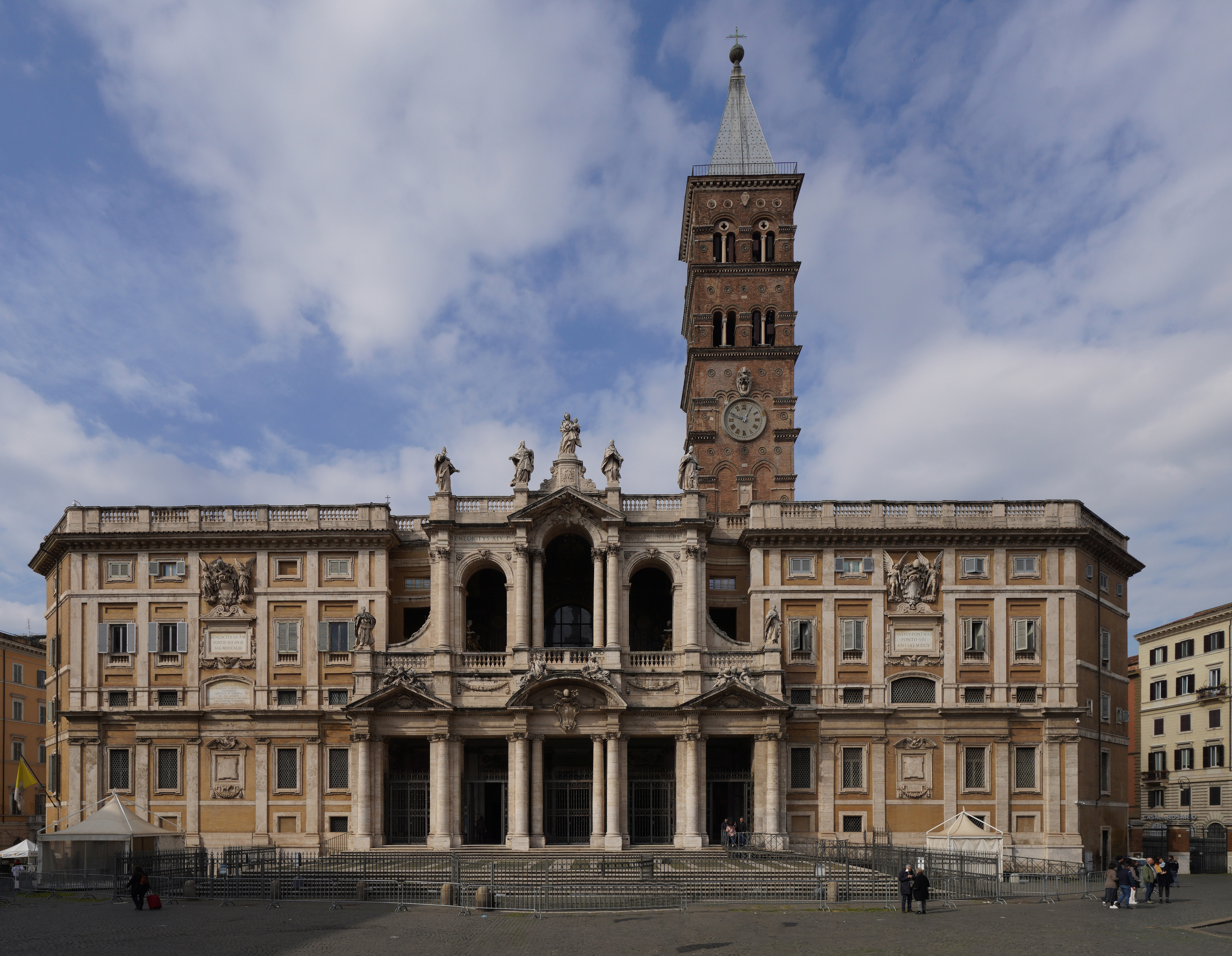
Santa Maria Maggiore, the first Marian church in Rome

Catholic Marian churches are religious buildings dedicated to the veneration of the Blessed Virgin Mary. These churches were built throughout the history of the Catholic Church, and today they can be found on every continent including Antarctica. The history of Marian church architecture tells the unfolding story of the development of Catholic Mariology.

The construction and dedication of Marian churches is often indicative of the Mariological trends within a period, such as a papal reign. For instance, the 1955 rededication by Pope Pius XII of the church of Saint James the Great in Montreal, with the new title Mary, Queen of the World, Cathedral, was a reflection of his being called "the most Marian pope". A year earlier, Pius had proclaimed that title for the Virgin Mary in his 1954 encyclical Ad Caeli Reginam. This encyclical on the Queen of Heaven is an example of how the interplay between churches and Marian art reinforces the effect of Marian devotions.

== The beginnings ==
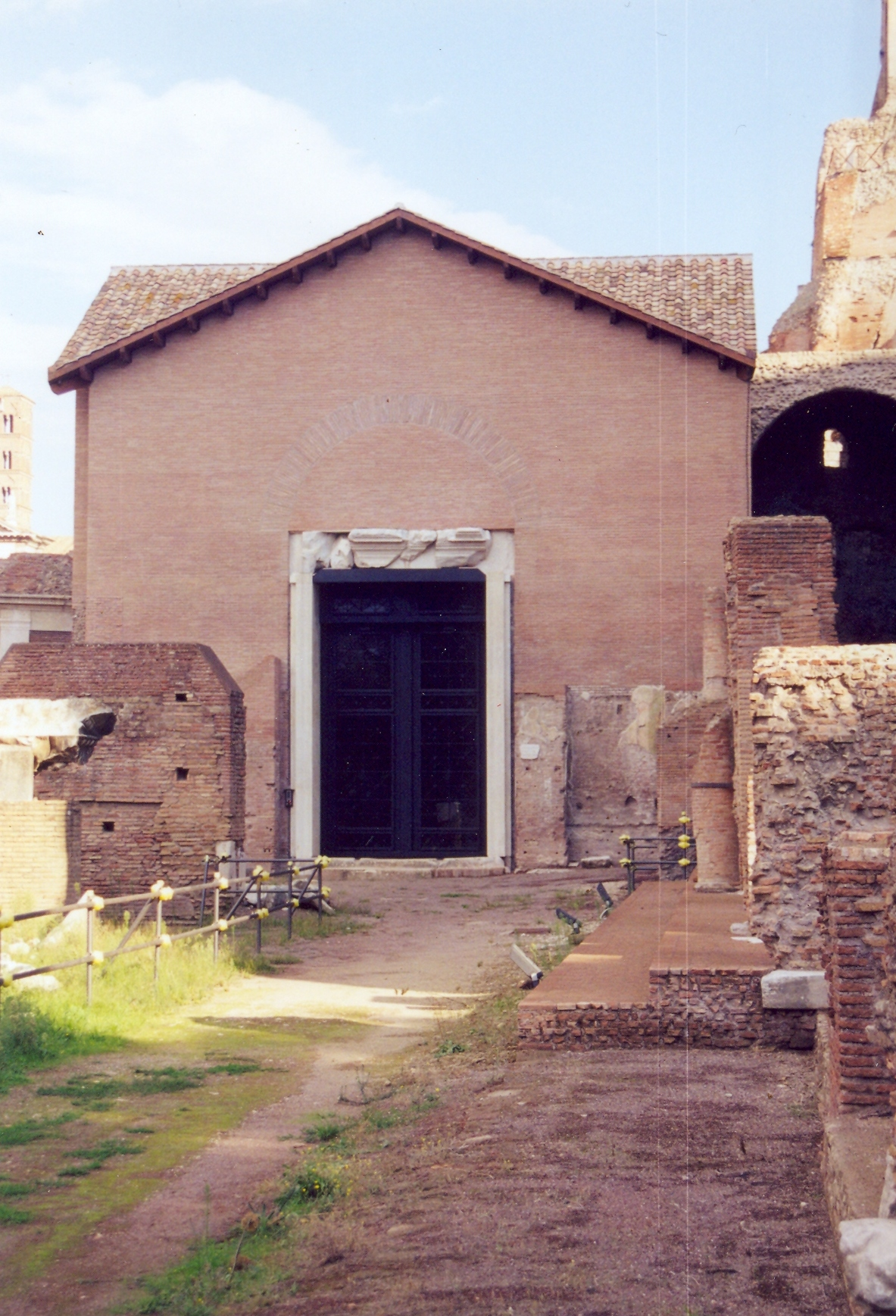
Santa Maria Antiqua, in the Forum Romanum, 5th century, seat of Pope John VII

The New Testament indicates that the practice of meeting together was an important part of the Christian faith from the very early days: "let us not give up the habit of meeting together... instead, let us encourage one another all the more" (Hebrews 10:25). Prior to the fourth century, Christians worshiped in private due to persecutions. After the edict of Milan was issued in 313, Christians were permitted to worship and build churches openly. The generous and systematic patronage of Roman Emperor Constantine I changed the fortunes of the Christian church, and resulted in both architectural and artistic development. In the following decades, congregations built churches for public worship.

The Church of Mary in Ephesus may be one of the earliest Marian churches and is dated to the early 5th century, coinciding with the Council of Ephesus in 431. It may have been built specifically for the council, during which the title of Theotokos, God-bearer, for the Mother of Christ was decided. The first Marian churches in Rome: Santa Maria in Trastevere, Santa Maria Antiqua and Santa Maria Maggiore, date from the first part of the fifth century and house some of the earliest forms of public Marian art. The church of Santa Maria Maggiore is now a papal basilica, where the pope presides over the annual Feast of the Assumption of Mary (celebrated each 15 August) and the church includes major pieces of Catholic Marian art.

Some of the early Roman churches were quite small. An example is the church of Santa Maria Antiqua (i.e. ancient St. Mary) built in the 5th century in the Forum Romanum. Pope John VII used Santa Maria Antiqua in the early 8th century as the see of the bishop of Rome. This church includes the earliest Roman depiction of Santa Maria Regina, portraying the Virgin Mary as a Queen in the 6th century.

Other churches, such as Santa Maria Maggiore, have seen significant additions to their art and architecture over the centuries. The Basilica of the National Shrine of Our Lady of Aparecida in Aparecida, Brazil, is now the second-largest Catholic place of worship in the world, second only to St. Peter's Basilica in Vatican City. In 1984 it was officially declared as "the largest Marian Church in the world."

Some Marian churches are major pilgrimage sites. According to Bishop Francesco Giogia, the Basilica of Our Lady of Guadalupe in Mexico City was the most visited Catholic shrine in the world in 1999, followed by San Giovanni Rotondo (not a Marian shrine) and Our Lady of Aparecida in Brazil. While in 1968 Aparecida had about four million pilgrims, the number has since reached eight million pilgrims per year. Given the millions of visitors per year to Our Lady of Lourdes and Our Lady of Fatima, the major Marian churches receive over 30 million pilgrims per year. In December 2009, the Basilica of Our Lady of Guadalupe set a new record with 6.1 million pilgrims during Friday and Saturday for the anniversary of Our Lady of Guadalipe.

== Progression of architecture and belief ==
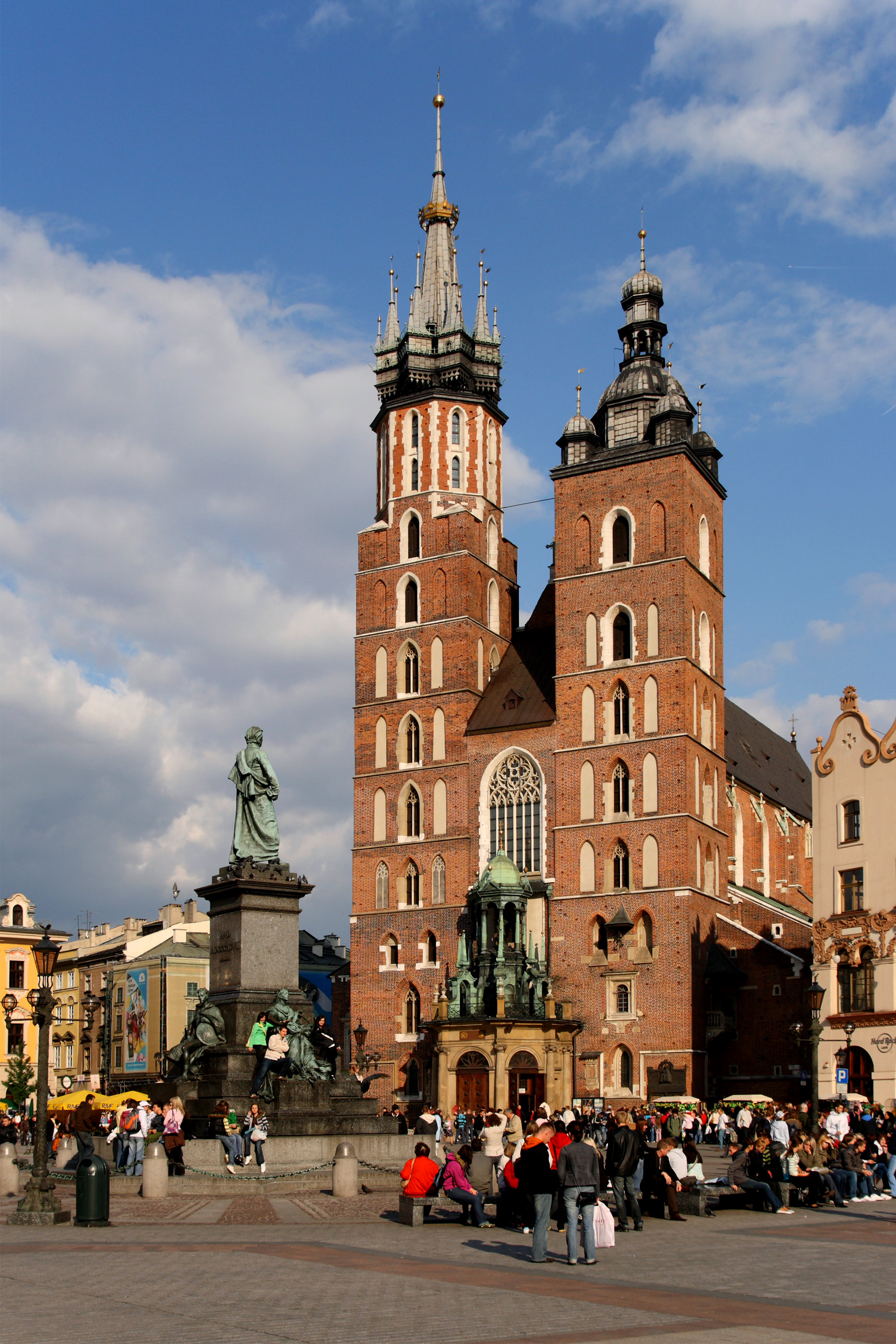
St. Mary's Basilica, Kraków

Through the centuries, the progression of Medieval architecture towards Romanesque, Gothic, Renaissance, Baroque and eventually modern Marian church architectures may be viewed as a manifestation of the growth of Marian belief – just as the development of Marian art and music were a reflection of the growing trends in the veneration of the Blessed Virgin Mary in the Catholic tradition.

A good example of the continuation of Marian traditions from the Gothic period to the present day is found at St. Mary's Basilica, Kraków in Poland. On every hour, a trumpet signal called the hejnał (meaning "St. Mary's dawn" and pronounced hey-now) is still played from the top of the taller of St. Mary's two towers, the noon-time hejnał being heard across Poland and abroad broadcast live by the Polish national Radio 1 Station. St. Mary's in Kraków also served as an architectural model for many of the churches that were built by the Polish diaspora abroad, particularly St. Michael's and St. John Cantius in Chicago, designed in the so-called Polish Cathedral style.

Popes have at times viewed the existence of Marian churches as a key to the spread of Marian devotions, e.g. as he entrusted Europe to the Virgin Mary, Pope John Paul II stated: "Thanks to the countless Marian shrines dotting the nations of the continent, devotion to Mary is very strong and widespread among the peoples of Europe."

== Apparition-based Marian churches ==
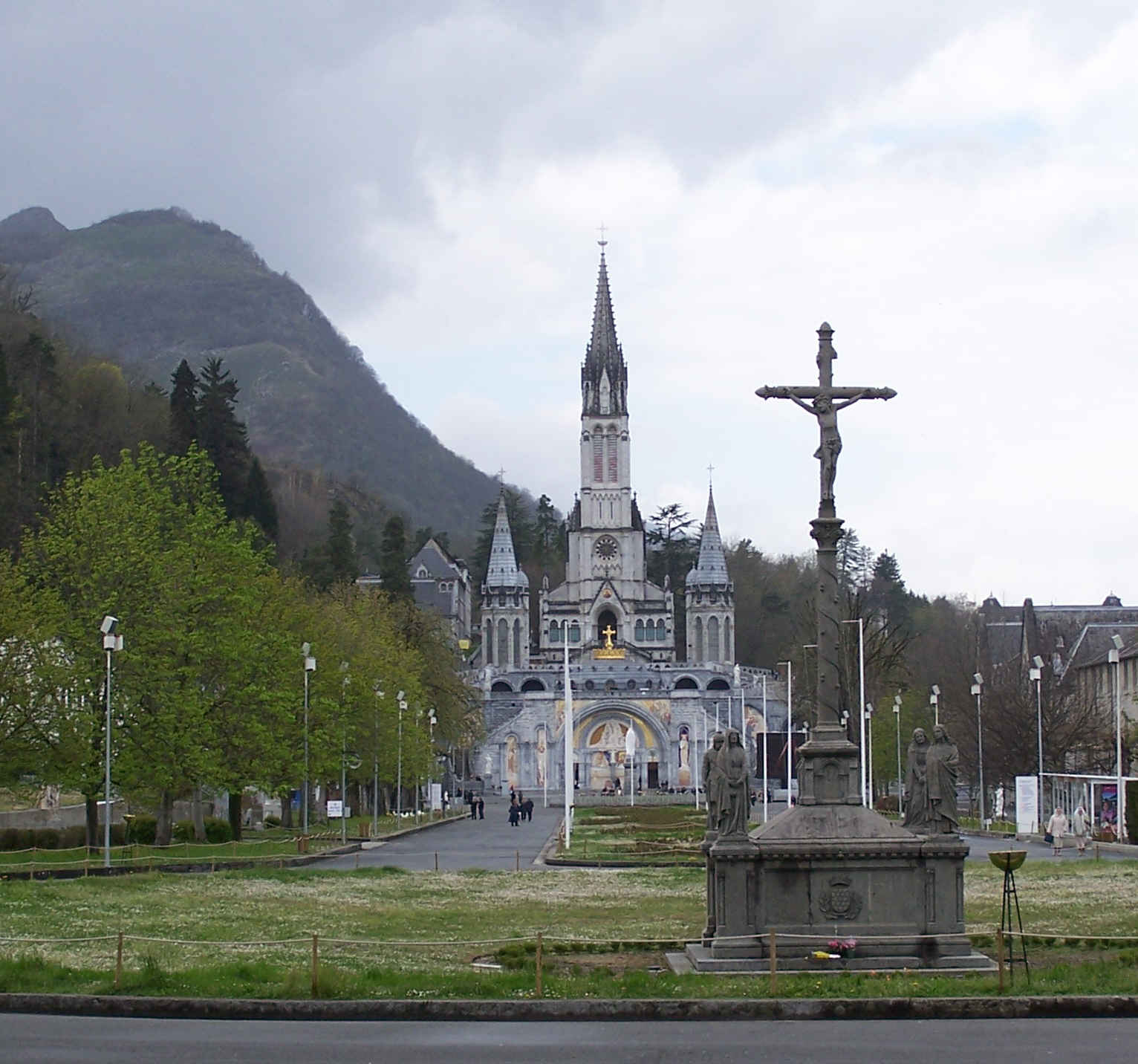
Sanctuary of Our Lady of Lourdes

Marian apparitions have resulted in the construction of major Marian churches. Some of the very largest Catholic Marian churches in the world did not start based on a decisions made by informed theologians in Rome but based on the statements of young and less-than-sophisticated people about their religious experiences on remote (and often unheard of) hilltops.

There are remarkable similarities in the accounts of the reported visions which have led to the construction of the churches. Two cases in point are the largest Marian churches in Mexico and France, based on the reported Marian apparitions to Saint Juan Diego in Cerro del Tepeyac, (Guadalupe) Mexico in 1531 and Saint Bernadette Soubirous as a child in Lourdes in 1858. Both saints reported visions in which a miraculous lady on a hill asked them to request that the local priests build a chapel at that site of the vision. Both visions had a reference to roses and led to very large churches being built at the sites. Like Our Lady of Lourdes in France, Our Lady of Guadalupe is a major Catholic symbol in Mexico. And like the Sanctuary of Our Lady of Lourdes in France, the Basilica of Our Lady of Guadalupe complex is one of the largest and most visited Catholic churches in the Americas.

Three Portuguese children, Lúcia dos Santos, Jacinta and Francisco Marto were equally young and without much education when they reported the apparition of Our Lady of Fátima in Cova da Iria, 1917. The local administrator initially jailed the children and threatened that he would boil them one by one in a pot of oil. Yet, eventually with millions of followers and Catholic believers, the reported visions at Fatima gathered respect and Popes Pius XII, John XXIII, Paul VI, John Paul II, Benedict XVI and Pope Francis voiced their acceptance of the supernatural origin of the Fátima, Portugal, events. The Sanctuary of Our Lady of Fátima is now a major Marian church in Europe.

The Shrine of Nostra Signora della Guardia in Genoa, Italy, has a similar story. In 1490 a peasant Benedetto Pareto reported that the Virgin Mary had asked him to build a chapel on a mountain. Pareto reported that he replied that he was only a poor man and would not be able to do that, but he was told by the Virgin Mary: "Do not be afraid!". After falling from a tree, Pareto changed his mind and built a small wooden room that was eventually enlarged to the present shrine.

And the trend has continued. The first approval for a Marian apparition in the 21st century was granted to the reported visions of Jesus and Mary by Benoite Rencurel in Saint-Étienne-le-Laus in France from 1664 to 1718. The approval was granted by the Holy See in May 2008. Again, in this case, a young Benoite Rencurel (who could not read or write) reported that a lady in white appeared to her on a remote mountain top in Saint-Étienne-le-Laus and asked her for a church to be built there.

In May 2016, the local ordinary of the Diocese of San Nicolás de los Arroyos Bishop Cardelli approved as "worthy of belief" the apparitions associated with the Marian image of Our Lady of the Rosary of San Nicolás. A Shrine erected in honor of Mary under this title was inaugurated in 2014. Reports of unusually radiant, glowing rosary beads were followed by a number of brief visions of Our Lady appearing to housewife and mother-of-two Gladys Motta developed into a series of interior locutions over several years, beginning on October 13 the anniversary of apparitions at Fátima. Specific messages led to the discovery—and restoration to veneration—of a long-neglected statue of a Madonna carrying the Christ Child. Occurring at the close of the twentieth century[2] the messages mirror those given at the beginning of the twentieth century to young shepherds in Portugal where the Virgin Mary reportedly identified herself as the Lady of the Rosary. Following approval of the spiritual merits by local religious authorities, a new church dedicated to Marian devotion under this title was erected as requested by Our Lady during the apparitions.

== Churches, icons and devotions ==
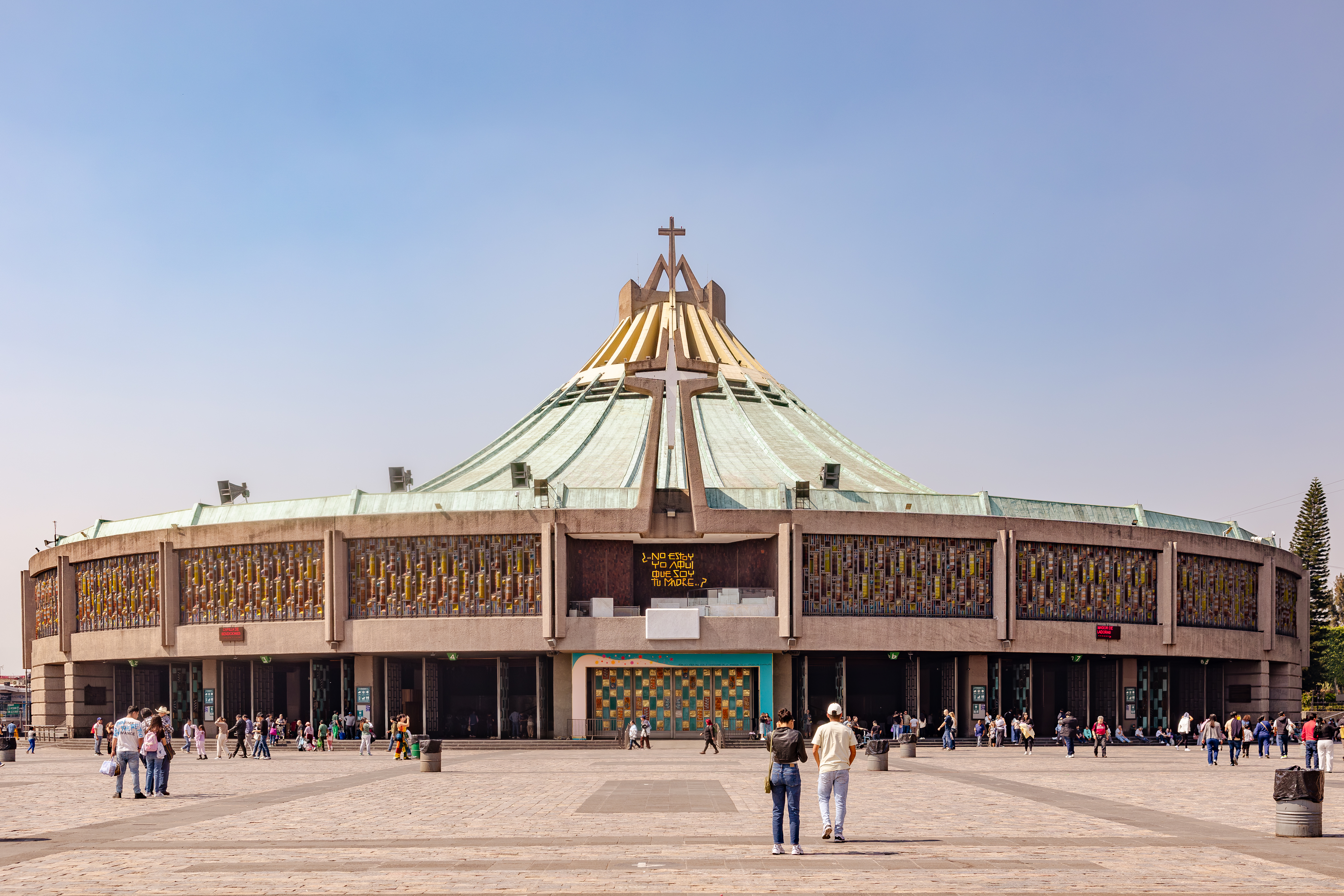
Basilica of Our Lady of Guadalupe

Major Marian churches at times house major Marian symbols or icons and the interplay between churches and these symbols can reinforce the effect of Marian devotions. For instance, the Borghese or Pauline Chapel of the Santa Maria Maggiore church houses Salus Populi Romani, which has historically been the most important Catholic Marian art icon in Rome. On 1 April 1899, Eugenio Pacelli (later Pope Pius XII) celebrated his first Holy Mass there. Almost 50 years later, in 1953, Pius XII had Salus Populi Romani carried from Santa Maria Maggiore through Rome to initiate the first Marian year in Church history. In 1954, the icon was crowned by Pius XII as he introduced a new Marian feast Queenship of Mary with the encyclical Ad Caeli Reginam.

Perhaps the ultimate example of this interplay is on Tepeyac hill, in Mexico, the site of the reported apparition of Our Lady of Guadalupe to Saint Juan Diego Cuauhtlatoatzin. The Basilica of Our Lady of Guadalupe on Tepeyac hill houses the tilma (cloak) of Saint Juan Diego on which the image of Our Lady of Guadalupe is said to have been miraculously imprinted, where he had gathered roses. Saint Juan Diego's tilma is a key national and religious icon in Mexico. The series of Marian churches on Tepeyac hill that have housed the tilma since 1531 have received an ever-increasing number of pilgrims and the Basilica of Our Lady of Guadalupe (one of the largest churches in the world) was constructed in 1974 to accommodate the over 5 million pilgrims that arrive there every year.

== Architectural periods ==
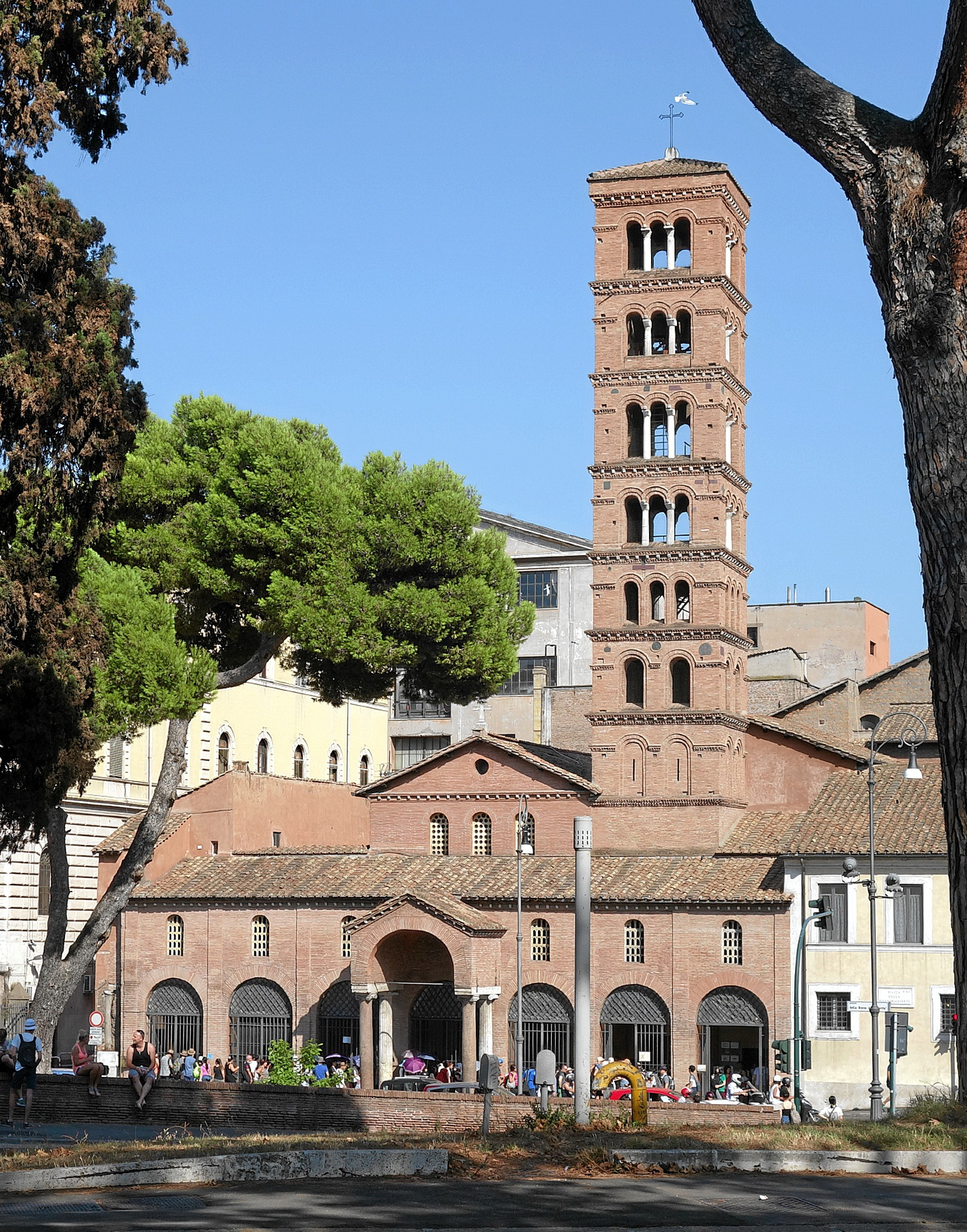
Santa Maria in Cosmedin

The progress of Marian church architectures manifests both the progress of architecture and the spread of Marian devotions.

If there is a single Marian location that captures several types of architecture, it is the area surrounding the Sanctuary of Our Lady of Lourdes. The Rosary Basilica was built with the Byzantine architecture in the 19th century. The "Basilica of the Immaculate Conception" known widely as the Upper Basilica, was consecrated in 1876 and is an elaborate building in the Gothic style, while the Basilica of St. Pius X, is a very modern building that was completed in 1958 and is almost entirely underground.

=== Romanesque ===
The basilica of Santa Maria in Cosmedin in the Forum Boarium in Rome is an early example of a Romanesque Marian church. It is the site of the famous La Bocca della Verità, an ancient Roman sculpture which draws many visitors every year.

Speyer Cathedral (also known as the Mariendom) in Speyer, Germany, is an imposing basilica of red sandstone and one of the largest Romanesque churches in the world. The distinctive colonnaded gallery that surrounds it and its imposing triple-aisled vaulted design influenced the development of Romanesque architecture in the 11th and 12th centuries.

Our Lady of Flanders Cathedral in Tournai is one of the key architectural monuments in Belgium. It combines the work of three design periods: the heavy and severe character of the Romanesque nave contrasting with the Transitional work of the transept and the fully developed Gothic style of the choir.

This early period, also included growth and development in other aspects of Mariology, with activities by key figures such as John Damascene and Bernard of Clairvaux. Chants such as Ave Maris Stella and the Salve Regina emerged and became staples of monastic plainsong. Devotional practices grew in number. The Ave Maria prayer gained popularity.

=== Gothic ===
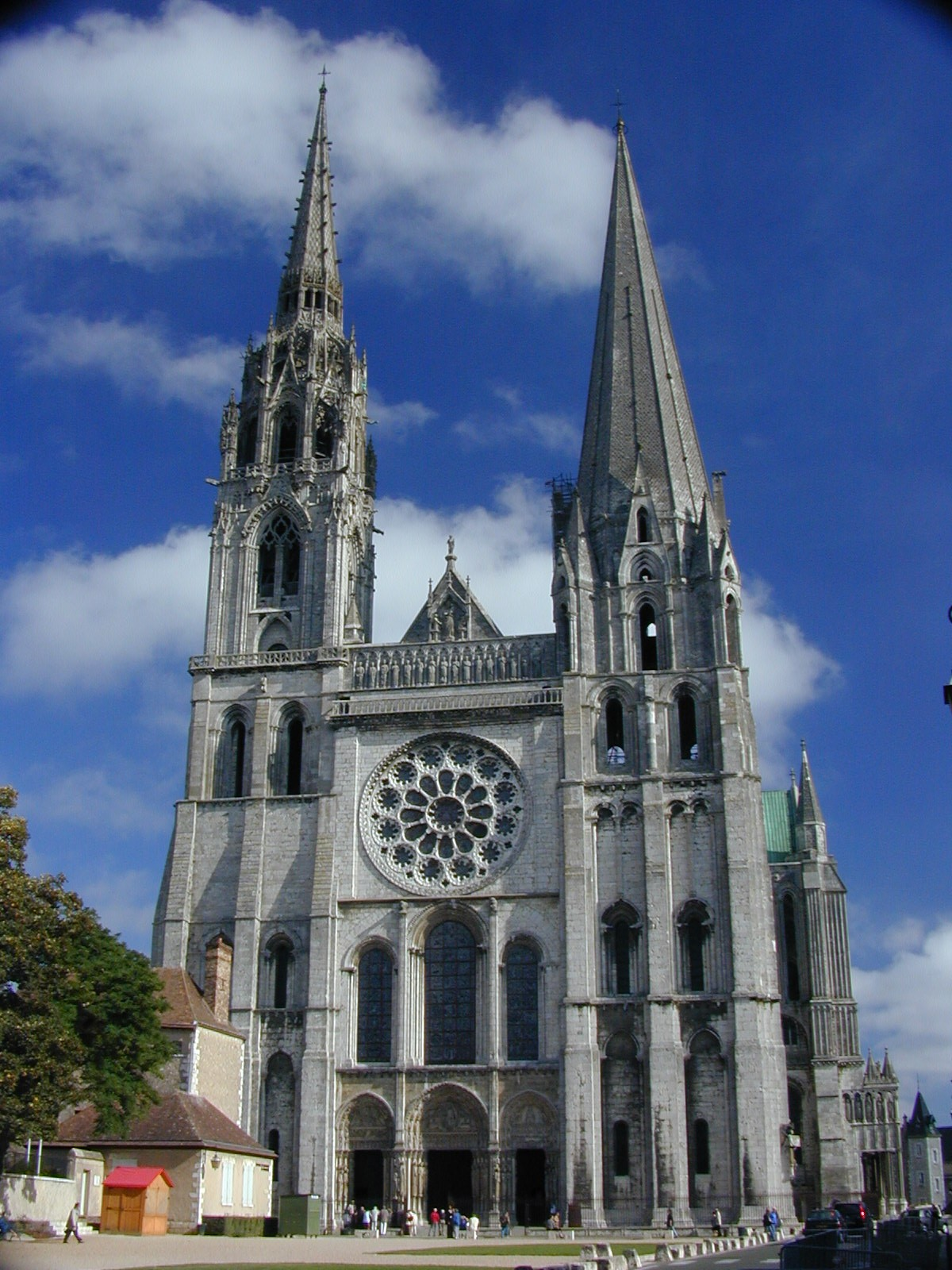
Chartres Cathedral

Notre Dame de Paris Cathedral is a prime example of French Gothic architecture. It was among the first buildings in the world to use the flying buttress. Its sculptures and stained glass show the heavy influence of naturalism, giving them a more secular look that was lacking from earlier Romanesque architecture.

Chartres Cathedral near Paris is also a good example of a French Gothic cathedral. Its two contrasting spires and the complex flying buttresses that surround it capture key architectural elements of the time. Reims Cathedral, where the kings of France were once crowned, exemplifies the heavier Gothic architecture present in the northern Franco-Germanic areas.

Further south, the façade of Santa Maria Assunta Cathedral in Siena Italy is an excellent example of Tuscan Gothic architecture by Giovanni Pisano.

The interior of Notre-Dame Cathedral, Luxembourg shows the Gothic style of design at its height. The basilica is a good example of late gothic architecture with many Renaissance elements and adornments.

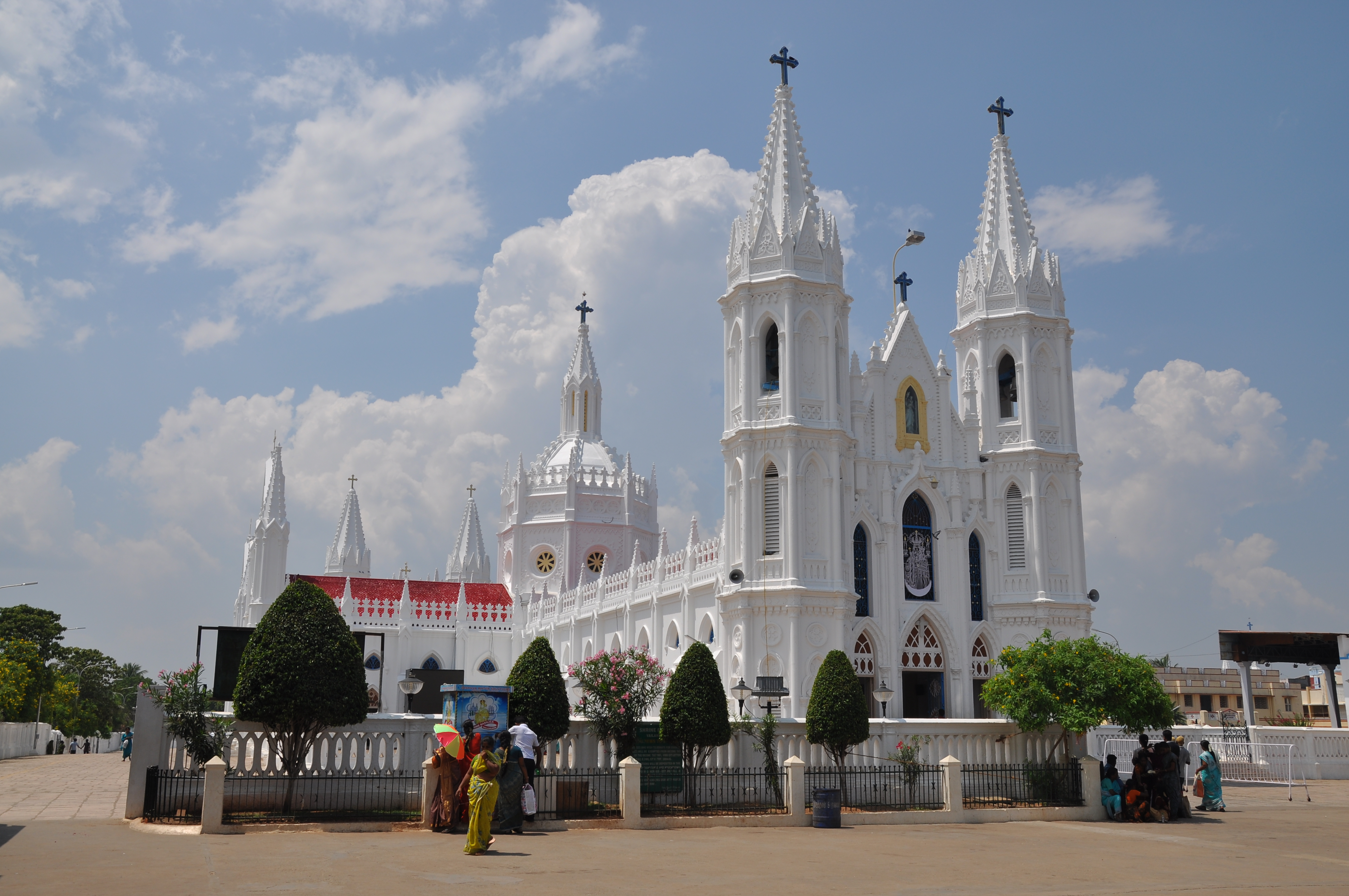
The Basilica of Our Lady of Good Health, a Gothic Marian shrine in Velankanni, India.

One major Mariological issue in this period was the Immaculate Conception. Gradually the idea that Mary had been cleansed of original sin at the very moment of her conception began to predominate, particularly after Duns Scotus dealt with the major objection to Mary's sinlessness from conception, that being her need for redemption. Popes issued degrees and authorized feasts and processions in honor of Mary. Pope Clement IV (1265–1268) created a poem on the seven joys of Mary, which in its form is considered an early version of the Franciscan rosary.

=== Renaissance ===
Dome of Basilica of Santa Maria del Fiore

Perhaps the key example of early Renaissance Quattrocento Marian architecture is the Dome of Basilica of Santa Maria del Fiore in Florence, Italy. The cathedral was consecrated by Pope Eugene IV in 1436 and was the first 'octagonal' dome in history to be built without a wooden supporting frame and was the largest dome built at the time (it is still the largest masonry dome in the world).

The facade of the Basilica of Santa Maria Novella in Florence is another example of the beginnings of the early Renaissance.

The Basilica of Santa Maria delle Grazie (Milan), famous for the mural of the Last Supper by Leonardo da Vinci is an example of the progression of architecture beyond the Gothic period and towards the Renaissance.

This period also saw unprecedented growth in venerative Marian art with the likes of Donatello, Sandro Botticelli, Masaccio, Filippo Lippi, Piero di Cosimo and Paolo Uccello among many others.

=== Baroque ===
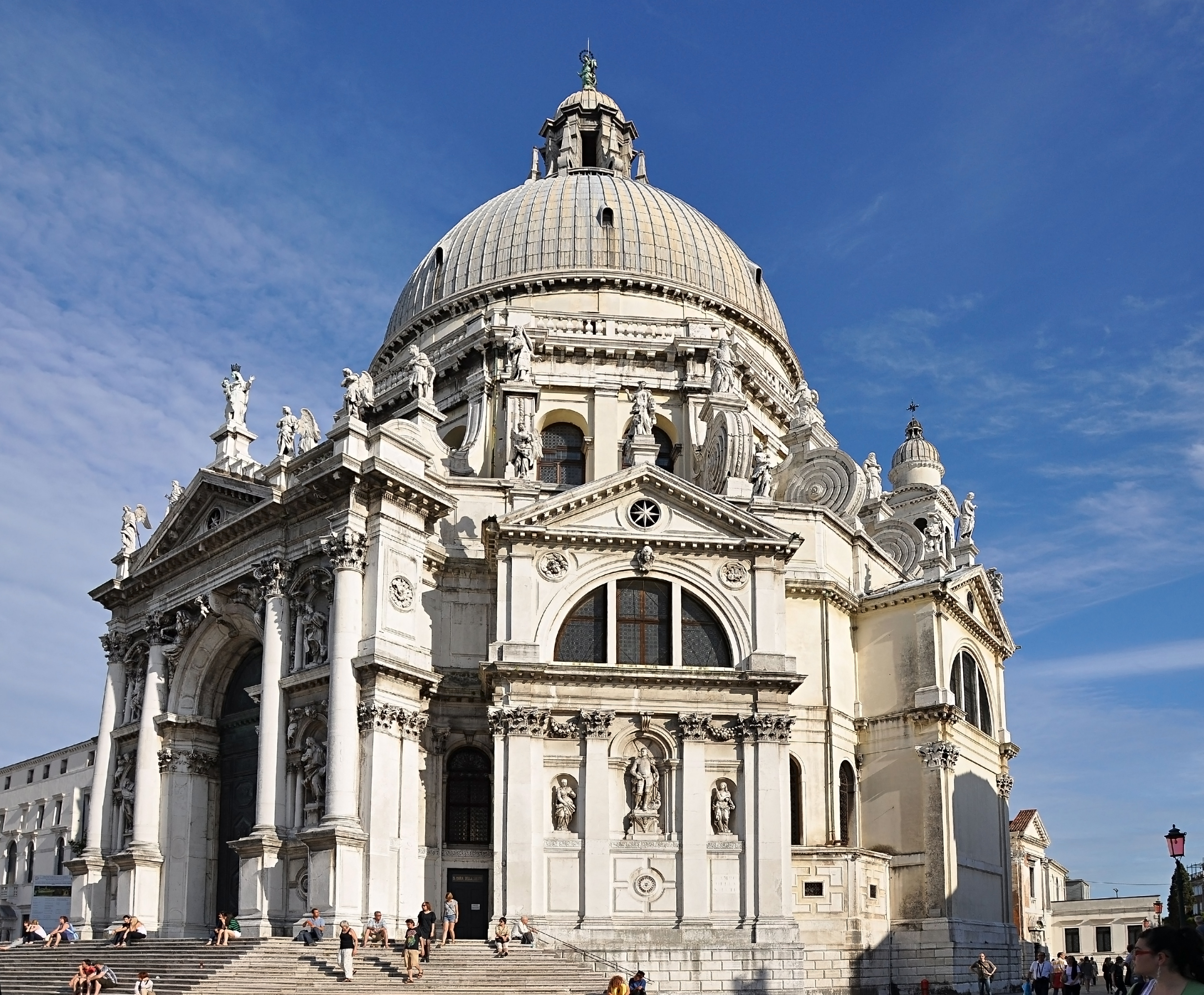
Santa Maria della Salute, Venice

The Santa Maria della Pace's Baroque façade, designed by Pietro da Cortona is a good example of a Marian church in Rome that progressed beyond the Renaissance.

The Basilica of Our Lady of the Pillar in Zaragoza, Spain, is a Baroque church built upon previous churches at the same site, dating back to the Romanesque period. Being a large rectangle with a nave and two aisles, with two other all-brick chapels, it has a typically Aragonese style and is illuminated by large oculi, characteristic of the buildings of the region from the 17th century onwards.

Some Marian churches are built as a response to specific events, e.g. Santa Maria della Salute in Venice was built to give thanks to thank the Virgin Mary for the city's deliverance from the plague. The church is full of Marian symbolism – the great dome represents her crown, and the eight sides the eight points on her symbolic star.

Baroque literature on Mary experienced unforeseen growth with over 500 pages of Mariological writings during the 17th century alone with contributors such as Francisco Suárez, Lawrence of Brindisi, Robert Bellarmine and Francis of Sales After 1650, the Immaculate Conception was the subject of over 300 publications. In this period Saint Louis de Montfort wrote his highly influential Marian books that influenced several popes centuries later.

Baroque Mariology was supported by Pope Paul V and Gregory XV. Alexander VII declared in 1661, that the soul of Mary was free from original sin. Pope Clement XI ordered the feast of the Immaculata for the whole Church in 1708. The feast of the Rosary was introduced in 1716, the feast of the Seven Sorrows in 1727. The Angelus prayer was strongly supported by Pope Benedict XIII in 1724 and by Pope Benedict XIV in 1742.

=== Modern ===
The modern period has witnessed unprecedented growth both for Marian churches and for papal and popular support for Marilogy, with a significant increase in the number of pilgrims to Marian shrines.

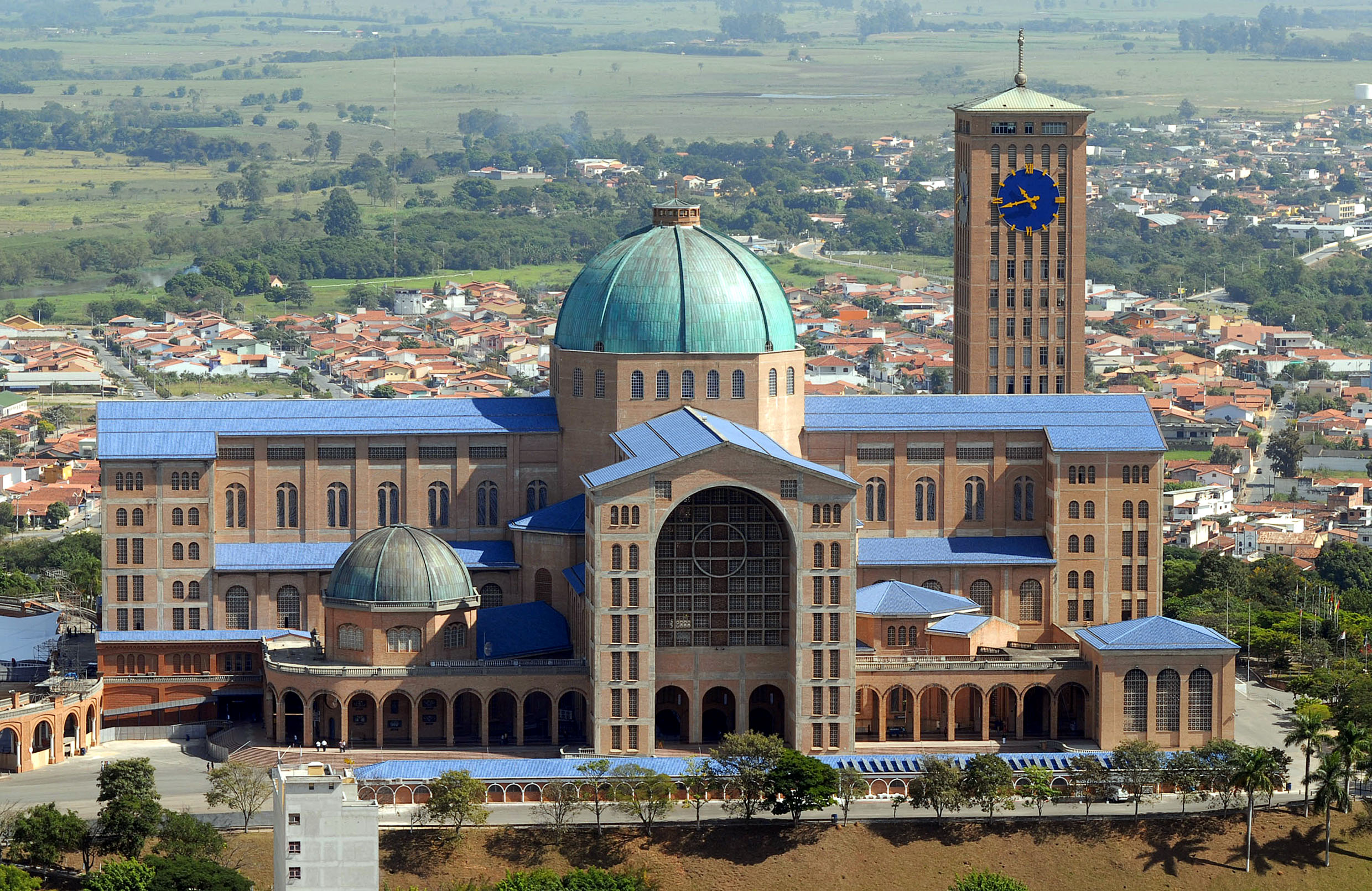
Basilica of Our Lady of Aparecida, Brazil, 1955. This basilica is the largest Marian church building in the world.

The Basilica of the National Shrine of Our Lady of Aparecida in Brazil is the largest Marian church building in the world, the largest cathedral and also the second largest church in interior area after Saint Peter's Basilica in Vatican City. It was constructed between 1955-1980 and consecrated by Pope John Paul II. It receives approximately 12 million visitors per year.

Two major Marian Basilicas were built in North America during the 20th Century in the capital cities of Mexico and the U.S. The first was the Basilica of the National Shrine of the Immaculate Conception; Washington, DC. The original plans called for a gothic structure, but were changed in 1918. It was decided at that time to build a structure with a Romanesque exterior and a Byzantine-style interior. From 1974 to 1976, a new Basilica of Our Lady of Guadalupe on Tepeyac hill, north of Mexico City, was built next to the 1709 church which was no longer safe due to weakened foundations. Both buildings are at the site of the apparition of Our Lady of Guadalupe to Saint Juan Diego Cuauhtlatoatzin. It is the most important pilgrimage site in Mexico and perpetual adoration takes place there by many people. By using its atrium, 40,000 people can attend mass at the basilica.

Other Marian churches started to appear around the globe. The Basilica of Our Lady of She Shan was built near Shanghai, China, as the largest Christian church building in East Asia. The new Immaculate Conception Cathedral was built in Manila, Philippines, and the Basilica of Our Lady of Candelaria in Tenerife, Spain.

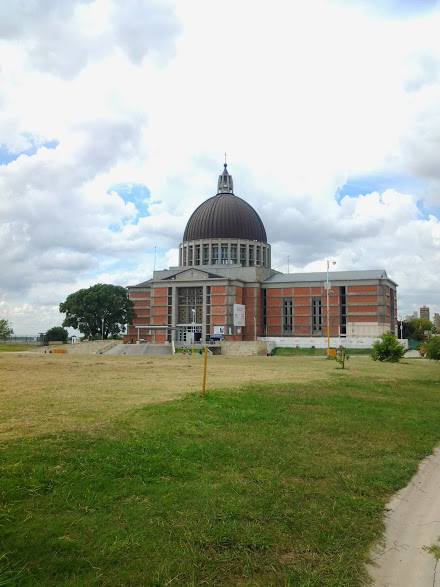
Our Lady of the Rosary of San Nicolás, Argentina, 2014

This period also saw the growth of lay Marian devotional organizations such as free rosary distribution groups. An example is Our Lady's Rosary Makers which was formed with a $25 donation for a typewriter in 1949 and now has thousands of volunteers who have distributed hundreds of millions of free rosaries to Catholic missions worldwide.

During this period key Marian papal encyclicals and Apostolic Letters were issued and Pope Pius X and Pope Pius XII both took major steps in establishing new Marian dogmas.

The encyclical Ad diem illum of Pope Pius X commemorated the fiftieth anniversary of the dogma of Immaculate Conception, and Pope Pius XII issued the Apostolic constitution Munificentissimus Deus to define ex cathedra the dogma of the Assumption of the Blessed Virgin Mary. More recently, Pope John Paul II's encyclical Redemptoris Mater took the step of addressing the role of the Virgin Mary as Mediatrix.

The Sanctuary of Our Lady of Lichen in Stary Licheń was constructed between 1994 and 2004. It is Poland's largest church, the seventh largest in Europe and eleventh in the World. It houses a 200-year-old painting known as the Our Lady of Sorrows, Queen of Poland.

Begun in 1987 the Sanctuary dedicated to Our Lady of the Rosary of San Nicolás in Buenos Aires province, Argentina was inaugurated May 25, 2014. It houses an historical statue of Our Lady identified by private revelations to a lay woman of the diocese that occurred over a number of years, and were documented in a book by Fr. Rene Laurentin, and subsequently approved as "worthy of belief" by the local ordinary Bishop Cardella in May 2016.

== See also ==
- Shrines to Mary, mother of Jesus
