= Collegiate Church of Notre-Dame =

Collegiate Church of Notre-Dame may refer to:

- Collegiate Church of Notre-Dame, Melun, France
- Collegiate Church of Notre-Dame, Dinant in Dinant, Belgium
- Notre Dame de Mantes in Mantes-la-Jolie, France
- Bourg-en-Bresse Cathedral, previously the Collegiate Church of Notre-Dame-du-Bourg
- Collegiate church of Notre-Dame at Utrecht
- A Collegiate church, where the daily office of worship is maintained by a college of canons; a non-monastic, or "secular" community of clergy, organised as a self-governing corporate body
