= On the Seine near Mantes =

Painting by Richard Parkes Bonington

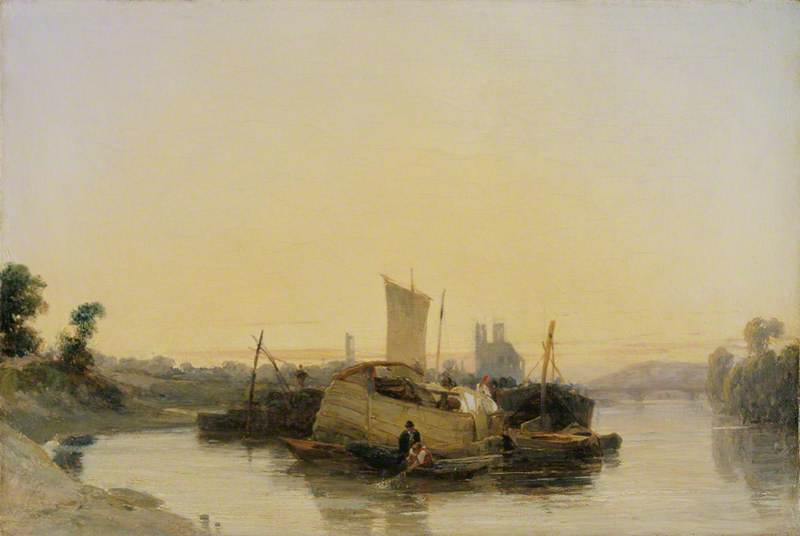
- Artist: Richard Parkes Bonington
- Year: 1825
- Type: Oil on canvas, landscape
- Dimensions: 51 cm × 65 cm (20 in × 26 in)
- Location: Wallace Collection; London

On the Seine near Mantes is an 1825 landscape painting by the British artist Richard Parkes Bonington. Bonington settled in France and painted a number of views of France and Italy. His romantic landscapes enjoyed critical success before his death from consumption at the age of twenty five.

This painting depicts a view of the River Seine near Mantes-la-Jolie around thirty miles from the capital Paris. In the distance can be seen Notre Dame de Mantes and the fourteenth century tower of the Saint-Maclou Church. Today the work is in the Wallace Collection in London, having veen acquired by the Marquess of Hertford in 1860.

== Bibliography ==
- Cormack, Malcolm. Bonnington. Phaidon Press, 1989.
- Duffy, Stephen. Richard Parkes Bonington. Wallace Collection, 2009.
- Pointon, Marcia R. Bonington, Francia & Wyld. Bradford, 1985
