= Hôtel de Ville, Mantes-la-Jolie =

Town hall in Mantes-la-Jolie, France

Hôtel de Ville
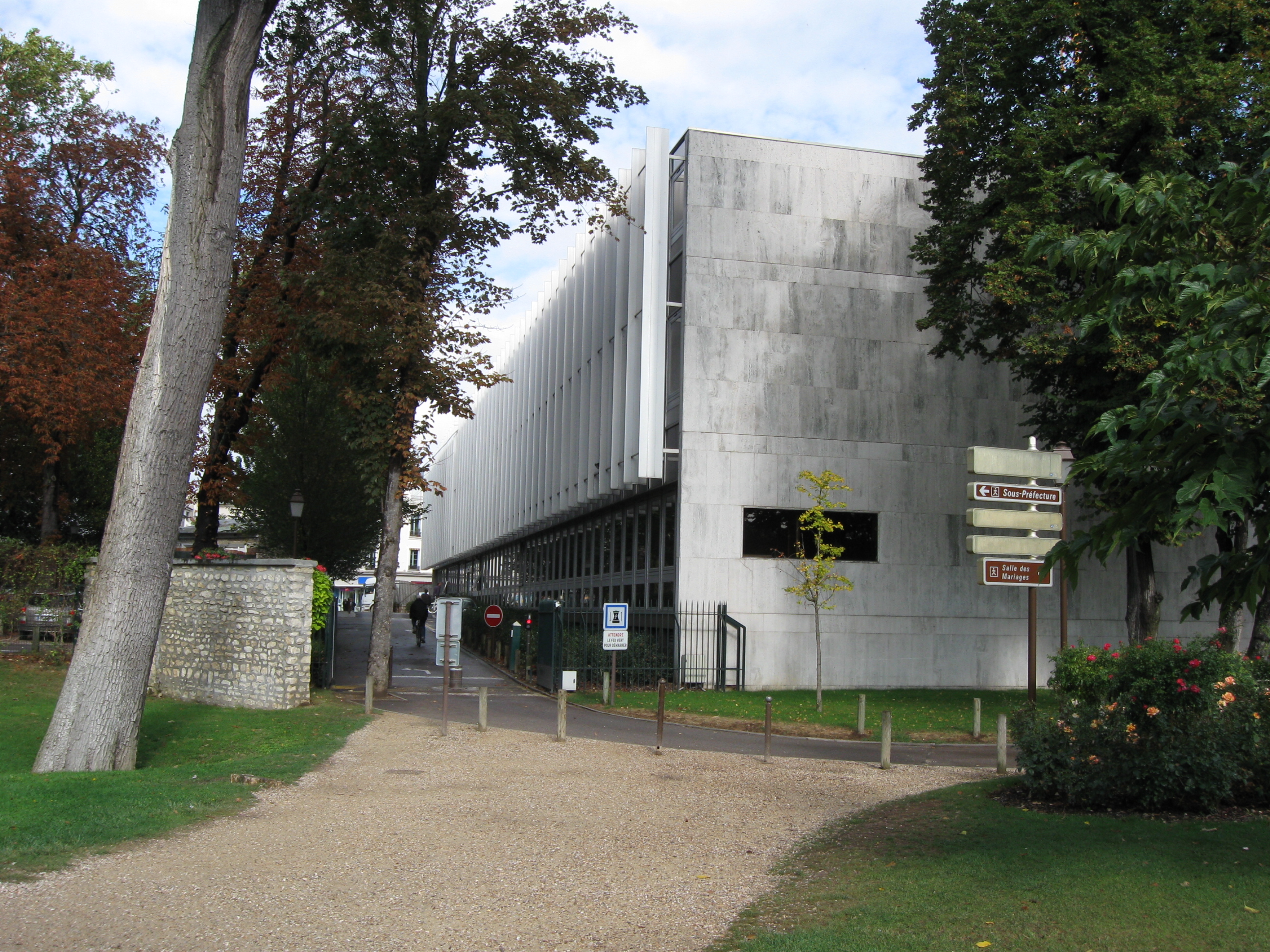
- The main frontage of the Hôtel de Ville in October 2009
- Interactive map of the Hôtel de Ville area

General information
- Type: City hall
- Architectural style: Modern style
- Location: Mantes-la-Jolie, France
- Coordinates: 48.9890°N 1.7154°E
- Completed: 1972

Design and construction
- Architects: Raymond Lopez and Raymond Marabout (1951 building); Rémi Lopez and Henri Longepierre (1969 building)

The Hôtel de Ville (French pronunciation: [otɛl də vil], City Hall) is a municipal building in Mantes-la-Jolie, Yvelines, to the northwest of Paris, standing on Rue Léon Gambetta.

== History ==
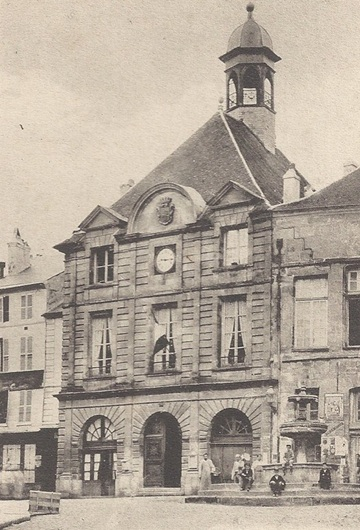
The old town hall

The first town hall was a timber-framed structure commissioned shortly after Louis VI granted a charter to the town in 1110. A fountain with a double basin was created by Nicolas Delabrosse and installed outside the town hall in 1521.

After the original structure became dilapidated, a stone façade was added to the building in 1645. The design involved a symmetrical main frontage of three bays facing onto the town square. The central bay featured a round headed doorway with voussoirs on the ground floor, a casement window on the first floor and a clock on the second floor, all surmounted by a round headed pediment with a coat of arms in the tympanum. The outer bays contained round headed doorways on the ground floor, casement windows on the first and second floors and triangular pediments above. Internally, the main assembly room was on the ground floor and there were two vaulted cellars below. Following the French Revolution, a public library was established in the building with books confiscated from the local convent. An extensive programme of refurbishment works, involving a new bell tower, was completed in 1830, and an annex was added to the right of the original building, to accommodate court hearings, in 1905.

The old town hall was completed destroyed by bombing by the US Ninth Air Force, intended to weaken German positions, on 30 May 1944, during the Second World War. Many other buildings in the surrounding area were also extremely badly damaged.

After the war the town council decided to commission a new town hall. The site they selected was on the south side of Rue Léon Gambetta. The new building was designed by Raymond Lopez and Raymond Marabout in the modern style, built in concrete and glass and was completed in 1951. It was a rectangular building with the north end facing onto Rue Léon Gambetta. However, following implementation of the Val Fourré Zone à Urbaniser en Priorité (ZUP), the council decided to extend the town hall to the northwest. Construction work on the extension commenced in 1966. It was designed by Rémi Lopez and Henri Longepierre in a sympathetic style, built in concrete and glass and was officially opened in 1972.

The design of the extension involved a much longer rectangular structure to the northwest of the original building. It featured a long façade, decorated with aluminium blades on the upper floors, facing onto Place de la République. A glass entrance was installed in the centre of the long façade. Internally, the principal rooms were the Salle des Mariages (wedding room) and the Salle du Conseil (council chamber) on the first floor. The interior design for these rooms was carried out by Philippe Boisselier and Claude Decaster.
