= Notre Dame de Mantes =

Church in Mantes-la-Jolie, France

Coordinates: 48°59′25″N 1°43′13″E

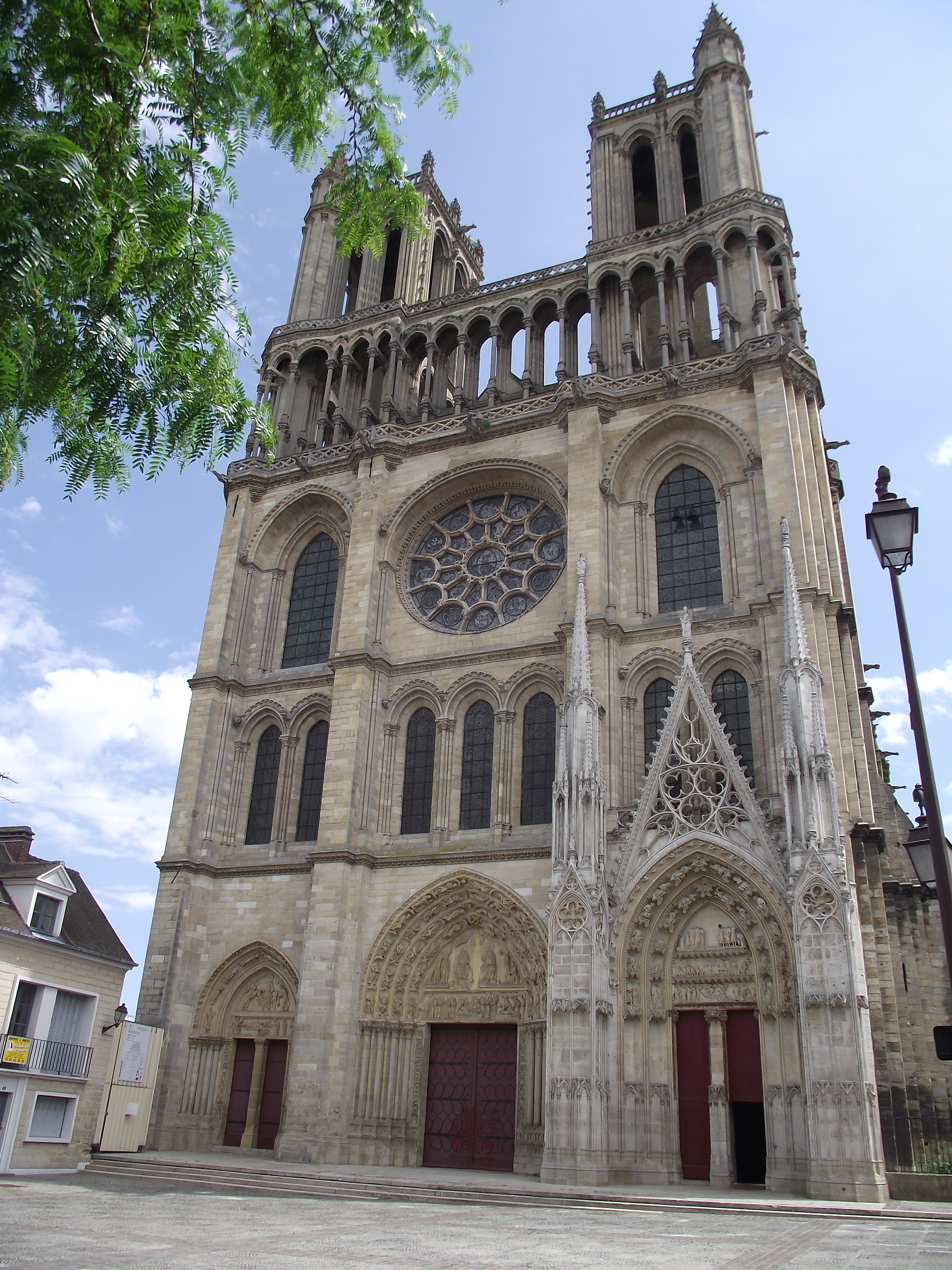
The west facade of the Collegiate Church of Our Lady of Mantes

The medieval Collegiate Church of Our Lady of Mantes, (French: Collégiale Notre-Dame de Mantes-la-Jolie), is a large and historically important Catholic church constructed between c.1155 and 1350 in the small town of Mantes-la-Jolie, about 50 km (30 mi) west of Paris. Although not a cathedral, it was built on a cathedral-like scale. Its grandeur, its quirky design and its strong associations with the Capetian dynasty make the church particularly interesting to architectural historians.

== Historical background ==
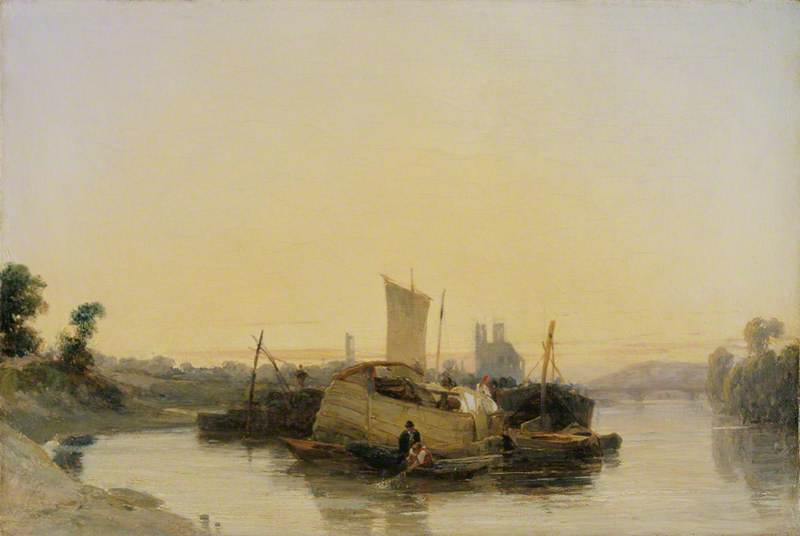
On the Seine near Mantes by Richard Parkes Bonington, 1825. The two towers of Notre Dame can be seen in the distance.

=== Context ===
Throughout the Middle Ages, Mantes' strategically important position on a navigable river on the boundary between the powerful Duchy of Normandy (based in Rouen) and the lands of the Capetian Kings (based in Paris) was a double edged sword, contributing to its commercial wealth but also placing it in the front line of many conflicts. King William of England attacked Mantes in 1087 and razed the old Carolingian town to the ground (in the process sustaining a mortal injury that killed him soon after), prompting a rebuilding programme that lasted through the subsequent two centuries. The town was granted 'commune' status by King Louis VI in 1110, the first town within the royal domains to receive this lucrative privilege (in medieval France, being granted commune status meant a town was effectively a self-governing free-trade zone). Within the commune the de facto civil authority rested with a powerful lay confraternity dedicated to the Assumption of the Virgin, while religious authority rested with the College of Canons. A Collegium dedicated to the Virgin had been founded at Mantes some time before 978, in which year the Countess of Blois bequeathed it several local villages and a considerable amount of farmland in her will. The College retained strong associations with the Counts of Blois and also with the royal family - the two abbots who governed between 1134 and 1159 were both brothers of King Louis VII.

=== Chronology of building ===
Construction of the present building began some time between 1155 and 1170, funded by income from the Commune and by the generous support of the Crown. Building work started with the raising and reinforcing of the ground along the north of the site, where the land slopes steeply down to the river. The design was on a grand scale but with a relatively simple plan, initially featuring neither transepts nor radiating chapels (though the latter were added later). The nave was completed up to the gallery vault level by around 1190. The high vaults were in place by around 1200 (c.1225 for the eastern bays) with the roof completed by 1240. The western facade was completed up to the base of the towers some time before 1225. The western towers are mainly 13th century work, except for the upper parts of the north tower, which was only completed in the late 15th century. Both towers had become dangerously unstable by the mid 19th century and were substantially rebuilt to a simpler design by the local architect Alphonse Durand (a student of Viollet le Duc's). Its proximity to a strategic river crossing meant that the church was at the centre of heavy aerial bombardment following the allied invasion of France in 1944. In spite of this the church survived WWII relatively unscathed, even though most of the surrounding town was flattened.

== Design and appearance ==
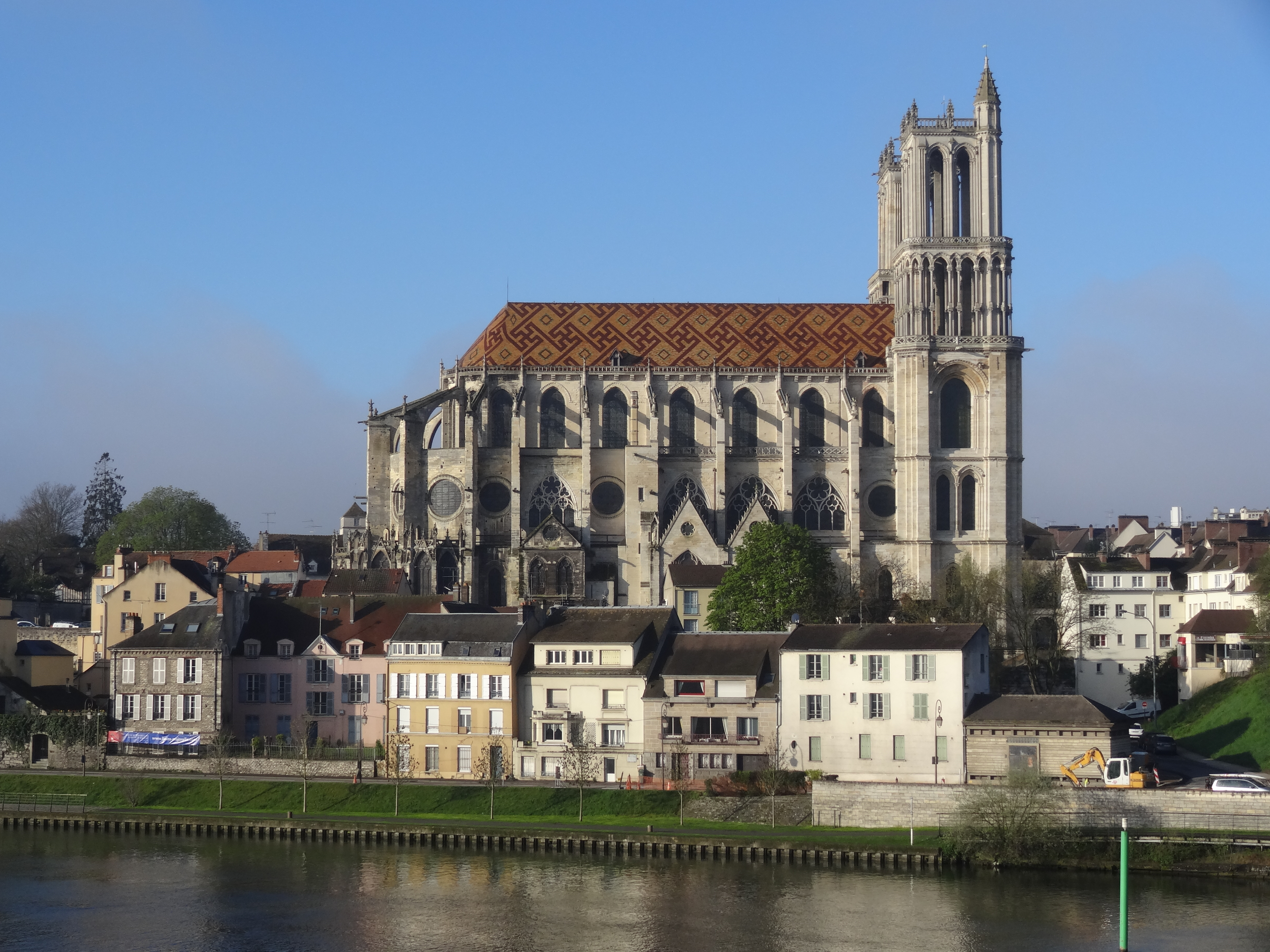
The Collegiate Church of Notre Dame de Mantes-la-Jolie, seen from the north east, across the River Seine.

The Collegiate Church of Notre Dame dominates views of Mantes, particularly when approaching from the north or east, where it sits on a bluff above a bend in the River Seine. From the exterior, its most distinctive features are the large round windows (oculi) at gallery level (see below), the cage-like flying buttresses and the general pock-marked appearance, caused by the unusually prominent putlog holes (left over from where the original builders attached their wooden scaffolding).

=== Interior ===
Internally, the nave has a three-part elevation (arcade, gallery and triforium), topped by a typical early-Gothic sexpartite vault, the vault responds resting on alternating compound and columnar piers. The outer walls at arcade level are massively built, around 180 cm thick, while those at gallery level are a mere 42 cm thick. This suggests that the original design didn't feature flying buttresses but that these had been incorporated into the plan by the time that construction began on the upper levels (possibly inspired by developments at Paris Cathedral, some 30 km to the east). The most distinctive feature, however, is the vaulting of the gallery level. Originally the bays of the gallery were given pointed transverse tunnel vaults, with the outer wall penetrated by a large oculus, possibly inspired by the ones used in the original triforium at Notre Dame de Paris. This kind of gallery vaulting is unique in France, the only similar example elsewhere being William of Sens' false gallery on the north side of the choir at Canterbury. Although it is an efficient way of minimising the lateral thrusts generated by the gallery vaulting, at Mantes it results in a relatively dark interior. This architectural experiment was not repeated elsewhere and was clearly regarded as something of a failure here too, as in the second half of the 14th century the gallery was remodelled in eight of the bays; the barrel vaults were replaced with more conventional quadripartite vaults and the oculi replaced with pointed-arch windows. The resulting bays are noticeably lighter than their unmodified neighbours.

=== West facade and eastern chapels ===
The west facade retains two 12th-century portals. The sculpture of the left portal (c. 1170) shows the Resurrection of Christ with the Quem quaeritis?, while the central portal (slightly later) shows the Death, Assumption and coronation of the Virgin. The west facade sculpture has clear affinities to that of the west portal of Senlis Cathedral and also to the Porte des Valois at St Denis and was probably made by a workshop familiar with both of those earlier projects. The rose window above the central portal is quite an early 'centripetal' type in which the spoke-like colonnettes have their bases outwards and their capitals towards the centre, resulting in a rather awkward arrangement of the segments. Jean Bony regarded this rose window, dated to c. 1215, as being a 'clumsy copy' of the ones at Laon Cathedral and St Yved in Braine and predating the more developed version at Notre Dame, Paris (normally dated to 1225). The stained glass, heavily restored and largely replaced in the 19th century, shows a typical Last Judgement theme. Unusually the glass panels are mounted flush with the inside wall, rather than being inserted into glazing slots - a system also found in the west rose at Notre Dame de Paris.

C. 1300 the right portal was remodelled in the latest style (probably inspired by the Portail de la Calende at Rouen Cathedral). This new portal was funded by the local magistrates and is hence known as the Portail des Echevins. Shortly afterwards, work began on modifications to the eastern apse, which was remodelled to incorporate a series of radiating chapels, also decorated in the Rayonnant style.

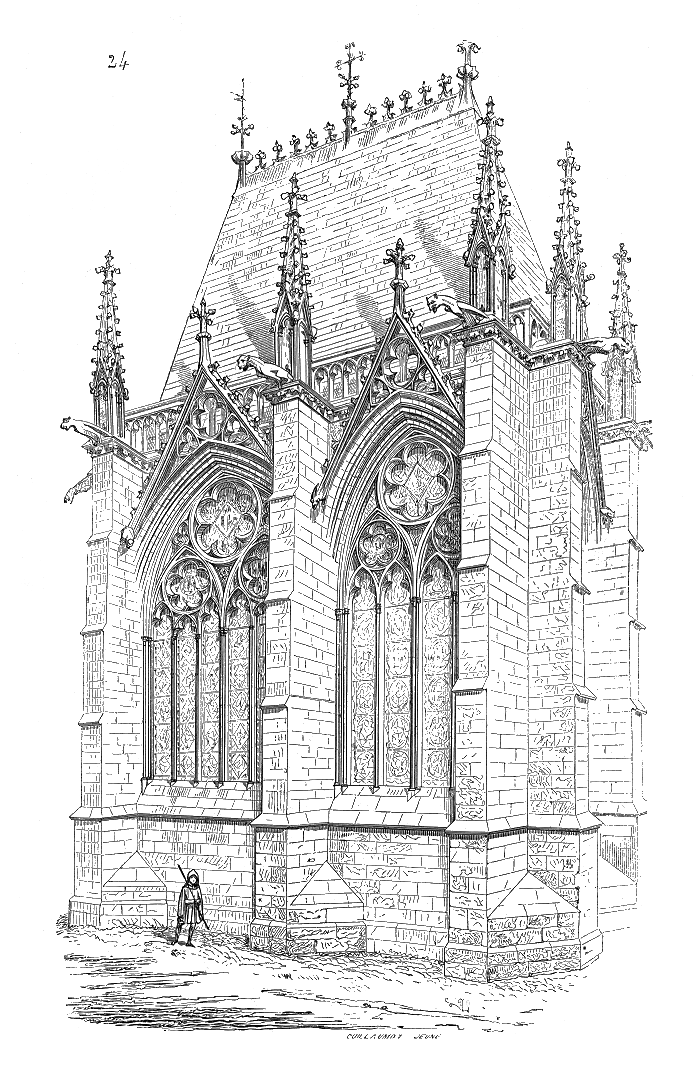
Violet le Duc's drawing of exterior of the Navarre Chapel

The largest of these new chapels was the Chapel of the Rosary, commonly known as the Chapel of Navarre, which was paid for by two prominent women of the French court, Jeanne d'Evreux (wife of King Charles IV) and Jeanne de France (Queen of Navarre). Although most of the original stained glass at Mantes has been lost (mostly during an outbreak of Revolutionary iconoclasm in 1794), the south side of the Navarre Chapel retains four excellent early 14th century roundels depicting Passion scenes, which show a restrained early use of silver stain. The other windows are early 20th century pastiches.

=== Statistics ===
- Overall length: 67.7 metres (222 ft)
- Width: 29 metres (95 ft)
- Height of nave vaults: 30 metres (98 ft)
- Width of central aisle: 11.75 metres (38.5 ft)
- Height of west towers: 61 metres (200 ft)

== See also ==
- Roman Catholic Marian churches
- France in the Middle Ages
