= Our Lady of Laus =

Marian apparitions taking place from 1664–1718

Coordinates: 44.5208°N 6.1524°E

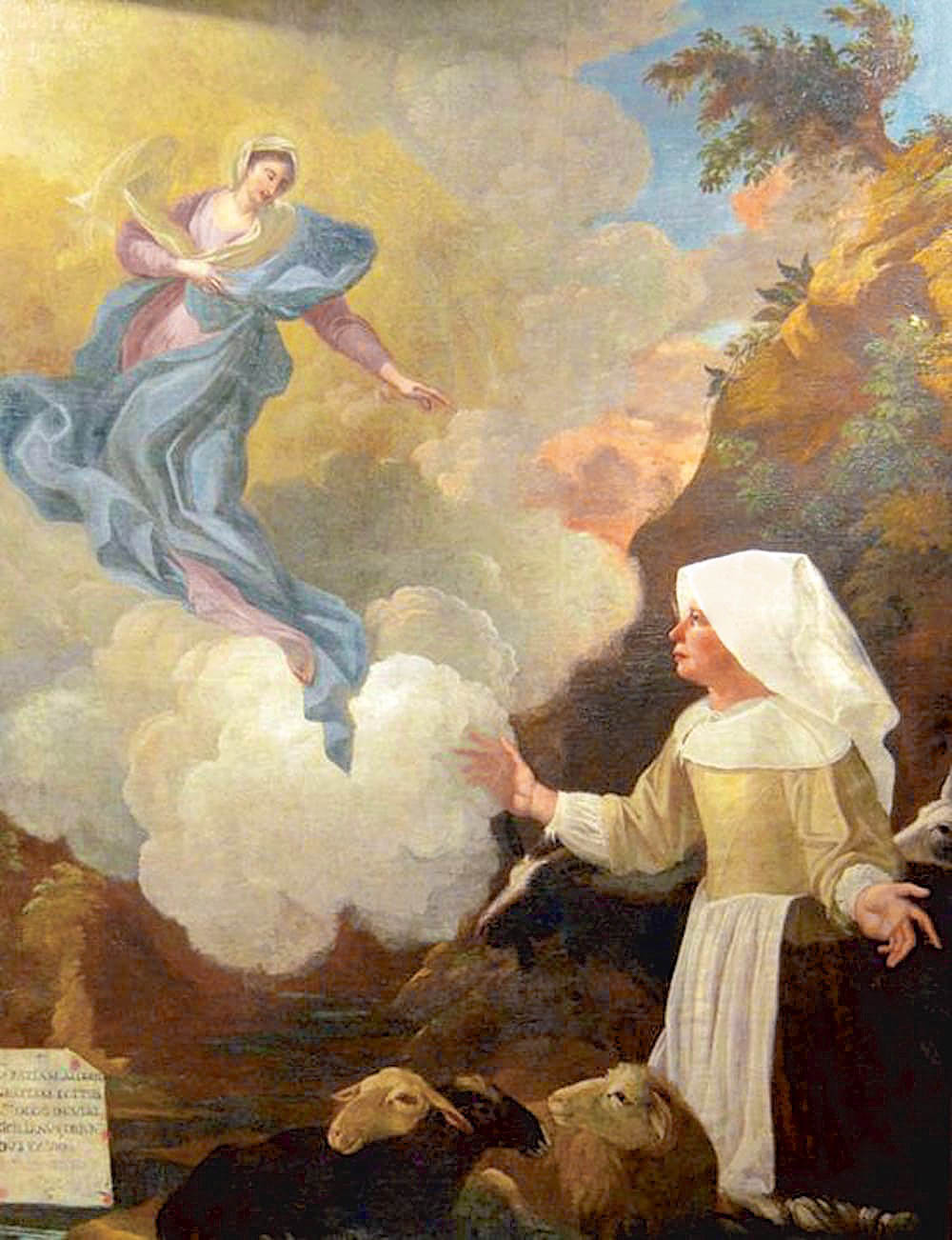
- Painting with the apparition of Our Lady of Laus to Benoîte Rencurel
- Location: Saint-Étienne-le-Laus, France
- Date: 1664–1718
- Witness: Benoîte Rencurel
- Type: Marian apparition
- Approval: May 5, 2008; Bishop Jean-Michel Di Falco; Diocese of Gap and Embrun
- Shrine: Sanctuary of Our Lady of Laus
- Feast day: May 1

Our Lady of Laus (French: Notre-Dame du Laus), or Refuge of Sinners, denotes Marian apparitions that took place between 1662 and 1718 in Saint-Étienne-le-Laus, France, to Benoîte Rencurel, a young shepherdess. On 23 May 1855, Pope Pius IX granted a Canonical Coronation to the marble image of Our Lady of Laus. On 5 May 2008, the apparitions were approved by decree of the local Bishop, Jean-Michel de Falco Leandri, with approval of the Holy See.

== Background ==
Situated in Dauphiné, in southern France at the foot of the Alps, just southeast of Gap, is the valley of Laus. Its name means "lake" in the local dialect, as there once was one at the bottom of the basin. In 1666, the hamlet held twenty households scattered in little huts. The inhabitants had built a chapel dedicated to the Annunciation, Notre-Dame de Bon Rencontre (means Our Lady of the Good Encounter, i.e., the Annunciation).

== Apparitions ==
Benoîte Rencurel was born on 16 September 1647, into a modest family in the village of Saint-Etienne d’Avançon, France. Benoîte's father died when she was seven and by the age of twelve, she had to work as a shepherdess to help her family. At the age of seventeen, she was still unable to read or write. She thus prayed the Rosary all day long during her daily journeys through the mountains with her flock.

In May 1664, after hearing a sermon from her parish priest, the seventeen-year-old Benoîte felt a deep desire to meet the Virgin Mary. Soon after, Saint Maurice, a third century martyr who was greatly honored in Laus, appeared to her near a nearby chapel in ruins, dedicated to Saint Maurice. He told her that her wish would be soon granted. He also warned her that if she remained in that area, the local guards would take her flock if they found it there. Saint Maurice told the shepherdess to go a nearby valley, called "Vallon des Fours", above Saint-Étienne, where she would see the Mother of God.

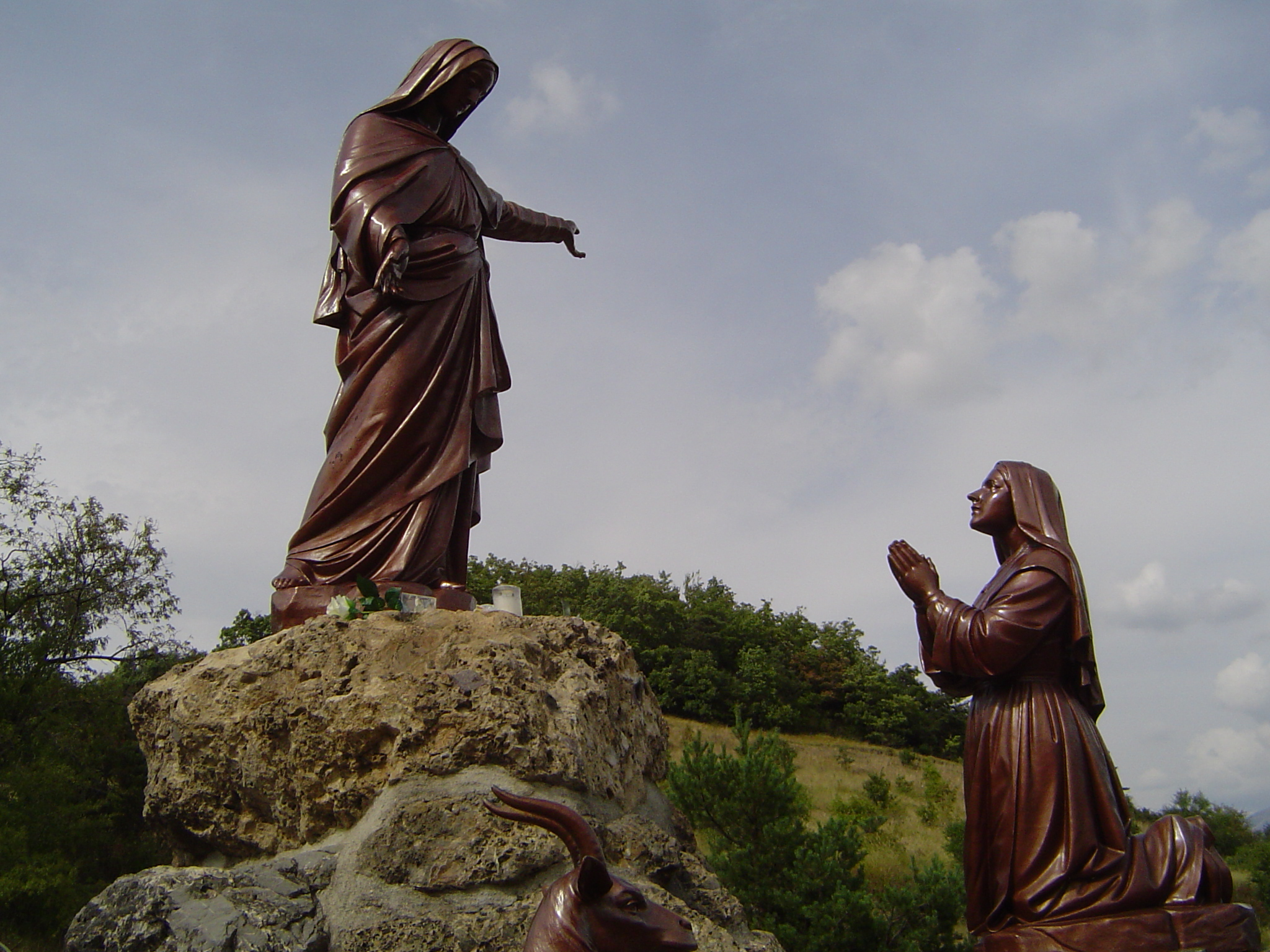
The Monument of Pindreau, in Saint-Étienne-le-Laus, depicting the apparition of the Virgin Mary to Benoîte Rencurel.

The next day, on 16 May 1664, Benoite took her sheep to the valley called "Vallon des Fours". She came to a grotto, where a "beautiful lady" appeared to her. She offered her to share the hard bread that she carried. The beautiful Lady smiled, but she left without saying a word. For a period of about four months, the Lady came back every day, spoke to Benoîte and gave her intensive education, which transformed her behavior and spiritual life. Others could not hear what the apparition said. On 29 August 1664, the "beautiful lady" revealed her identity: "I am Lady Mary, the Mother of my very dear Son".

At the end of September 1664, after a month of absence, Lady Mary reappeared to Benoîte on the other side of the valley, in Pindreau. The Lady said to her : "Go to Laus, you will find a chapel there from which sweet scents will emanate, and there you will speak to me often". The next day, Benoîte made her way to Laus from her village and, guided by the smell, found an old chapel dedicated to Our Lady of the Good Encounter. And while the smell of violets was there, the chapel was in bad condition. Inside, standing on the altar, Mary revealed her plan to Benoîte: "I have asked my Son for this place for the conversion of sinners, and He has granted it to me". "It is my desire that a new chapel be built here in honour of my beloved Son. It will become a place of conversion for numerous sinners and I shall appear here very often" said the Lady to the young shepherdess. When the sanctuary would be built, Mary also told Benoîte that the oil from the sanctuary lamp would work miracles with the infirm if they received the anointing with faith in her intercession.

Father Antoine Lambert, the vicar general of the diocese, initially doubted the visions. He wanted to test her story and instructed Benoîte to ask the Virgin Mary for a sign or miracle that would prove the authenticity of her visions. Later, a crippled woman, whose legs had been permanently bent backward and who was said to be incurable by the doctors, had been attending a novena at the chapel. On the final day of her novena, her legs miraculously returned to normal, and she walked into the chapel, shouting “Miracle!”. Father Lambert, who had been saying Mass at the time, was moved to tears and exclamed “Yes, the hand of God is there”. With this extraordinary event, Father Lambert gave his approval to construct the church the Lady Mary had requested.

For 54 years, the Virgin Mary continued to appear to Benoîte throughout her life. Benoîte became a Dominican Tertiary and was called "Sister Benoîte". She was given by Mary the mission to welcome the pilgrims. Benoîte was also given the gift of reading souls, to help the pilgrims make good confessions to the priests, by making them know their sins, remember the forgotten ones, and confess them and repent in the sacrament of Penance. There have been many testimonies saying that a heavenly perfume would fill the church every time Mary would appear to Benoîte. In addition to Marian apparitions, Benoîte also had apparitions of angels, several saints, and mystical experiences such as visions of Paradise.

Between 1669 and 1684, she was also granted the vision of the crucified Christ on the cross of Avançon five times. On a Friday in July of 1673, according to Benoîte, Jesus on the cross told her: “My daughter, I show myself in this state so that you can participate in my Passion.” United with Him, she lived a "mystical crucifixion" every Friday for several years and bore stigmata.

== Message ==
The message of Our Lady of Laus is a message of reconciliation with God, of confession of sin and penance, and a chapel to be built so sinners could convert, along with a house for priests to be built so they could administer the sacraments to sinners.

According to Bishop Leandri, at the heart of the message given to Benoite is a conversion of souls which aims to bring full reconciliation with oneself, with others, and with God.

== The Laus Manuscripts ==
The Laus apparitions are extensively documented thanks to the "Laus Manuscripts", which are a collection of writings produced by four authors who were eyewitnesses and personally acquainted with Benoîte Rencurel. These authors are:

- François Grimaud, judge in the Avançon valley and prosecutor in Gap, eyewitness of the apparitions;
- Jean Peytieu, a priest from the diocese of Embrun and Doctor of Theology, who was in daily contact with Benoîte for twenty years;
- Pierre Gaillard, vicar general of Gap, chaplain to the king, Doctor of Theology and confessor of Benoîte;
- François Aubin, a hermit at the Col de l'Ange and confidant of Benoîte, eyewitness;

After Benoîte's death, François Aubin collected and preserved the manuscripts, which totaled 1,800 pages of testimonies. He later passed them to the Fathers of Sainte-Garde, chaplains of the Laus pilgrimage. During the French Revolution, as the chaplains were either imprisoned or dispersed, one of them hid the documents in an attic, where they were forgotten.

In 1818, the Oblate Fathers of Mary Immaculate took over the management of the pilgrimage. In 1824, one of the Oblates discovered the bundle of manuscripts. In 1850, at the request of Depéry, Bishop of Gap, the manuscripts were cataloged, organized and recopied by Abbot Galvin, resulting in the “Authentic Copy of the Manuscripts”.

In 1977, for the first time, the manuscripts were fully examined and presented to the public in Father De Labriolle's publication: Benoîte, la bergère de Notre-Dame du Laus. In 1996, as part of the ongoing process for the beatification of Benoîte, which was reopened in 1981 by Pope John Paul II thanks to Labriolle's historical work, 500 copies of the “Authentic Copy” were reproduced.

== Veneration ==
By the spring of 1665, during the apparitions, pilgrims started to come to Laus. 130,000 pilgrims visited the shrine in the span of 18 months, with testimonies of healings and conversions. In September 1665, the diocese of Embrun authorized the pilgrimage, along with the construction of a church and the installation of priests.

Between 1666 and 1669, a church was built and the chapel of Notre-Dame de Bon Rencontre was incorporated into it.

On 23 May 1855, Pope Pius IX granted a Canonical Coronation to the marble image of Our Lady of Laus, with 40,000 people attending the crowning ceremony. He later named Benoîte Rencurel a “Servant of God” in 1872.

In 1892, the church was given the title minor basilica, the Basilica of Our Lady of Laus. The shrine is now run by diocesan clergy with the assistance of a community of the Brothers of Saint John.

On 16 June 2005, the local Bishop of Gap and Embrun, Jean-Michel Di Falco Leandri, wrote to the Congregation for the Doctrine of the Faith to inquire about the steps to recognize the supernatural nature of the Laus apparitions. Following the Holy See response, on 22 November 2005, Di Falco established a commission of theologians, historians, and scientifics to study the events. On 15 January 2007, the commission's report was sent to Di Falco, who submitted his judgment to the Vatican.

On 5 May 2008, Bishop Jean-Michel de Falco Leandri, promulgated the recognition decree and announced the Holy See's recognition of the apparitions as Our Lady of Laus, Refuge of Sinners, during a Mass held at the sanctuary in the presence of the Apostolic Nuncio in France Fortunato Baldelli, several cardinals, and many bishops.

In 2009, Pope Benedict XVI recognized the seer Benoîte Rencurel heroic in virtue and declared her venerable.

A few of the saints who have had a particular devotion to Our Lady of Laus include Saint Eugène de Mazenod (1782–1861), founder of the Oblates of Mary Immaculate; and Peter Julian Eymard (1811–1868), founder of the Blessed Sacrament Fathers and of the Servants of the Blessed Sacrament. When Eymard was eleven years old he made a sixty-kilometer pilgrimage on foot in order to pray for nine days at the shrine while preparing for his First Communion. Also devoted to Our Lady of Laus was Dom Jean-Baptiste Chautard, Abbot of Sept-Fons.

French philosopher and theologian Jean Guitton said, “The Shrine of Laus is one of the most hidden and also most powerful treasures in the history of Europe”.
