= Hamady Tamboura =

French footballer (born 1989)

Personal information
- Date of birth: 23 June 1989 (age 37)
- Place of birth: Mantes-la-Jolie, France
- Height: 1.73 m (5 ft 8 in)
- Position: Midfielder

Team information
- Current team: Athlético Marseille

Senior career*
Years	Team	Apps	(Gls)
2009–2011	Mantes	56	(13)
2011–2012	Angers	5	(0)
2012–2013	Romorantin	29	(4)
2013–2016	Dunkerque	85	(6)
2016–2017	Boulogne	12	(0)
2017–2018	GS Consolat	29	(4)
2018–2019	Les Herbiers	20	(1)
2019–	Athlético Marseille	0	(0)
- * Club domestic league appearances and goals as of 12:27, 16 August 2019 (UTC)

Hamady Tamboura (born 23 June 1989) is a French professional footballer who plays for Athlético Marseille. Tamboura previously played for Angers, where he made five appearances in Ligue 2.

He holds French and Senegalese nationalities.
