= Mantes-la-Jolie =

- Subprefecture and commune
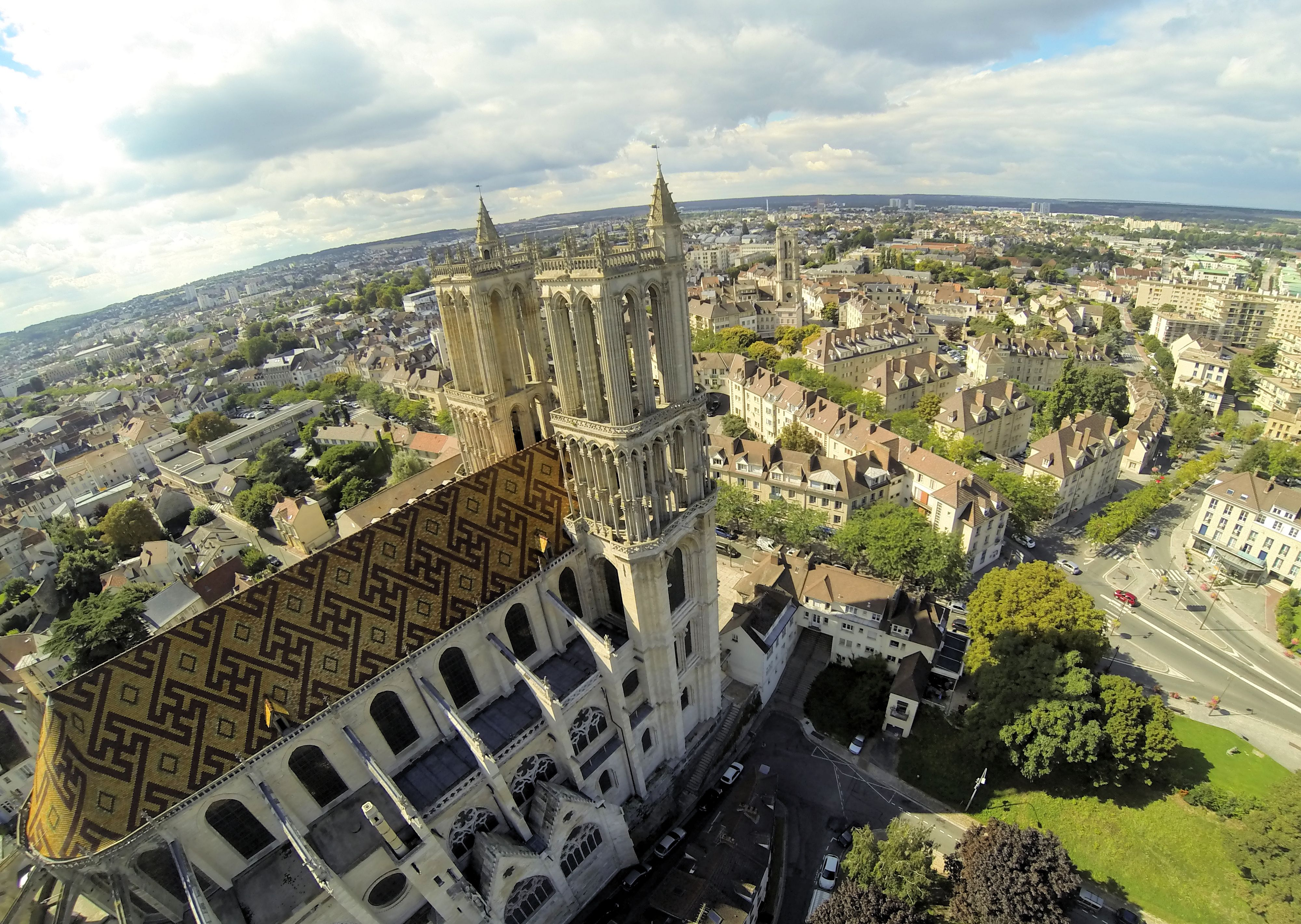
- The Collegiate Church of Notre-Dame de Mantes

- Coat of arms
- Location of Mantes-la-Jolie
- Location within France Location within Île-de-France (region)
- Coordinates: 48°59′27″N 1°43′02″E
- Country: France
- Region: Île-de-France
- Department: Yvelines
- Arrondissement: Mantes-la-Jolie
- Canton: Mantes-la-Jolie
- Intercommunality: CU Grand Paris Seine et Oise

Government
  - Mayor (2026–2032): Adama Gaye
- Area^{1}: 9.38 km^{2} (3.62 sq mi)
- Elevation: 34 m (112 ft)
- Highest elevation: 41 m (135 ft)
- Lowest elevation: 17 m (56 ft)
- Population (2023): 43,526
  - Density: 4,640/km^{2} (12,000/sq mi)
- Demonym(s): Mantais (masculine); Mantaise (feminine)
- Time zone: UTC+01:00 (CET)
  - Summer (DST): UTC+02:00 (CEST)
- INSEE/Postal code: 78361 /78200
- ^{1} French Land Register data, which excludes lakes, ponds, glaciers > 1 km^{2} (0.386 sq mi or 247 acres) and river estuaries.

Mantes-la-Jolie (French pronunciation: [mɑ̃t la ʒɔli], often informally called Mantes) is a commune in the Yvelines department in the Île-de-France region of north-central France. It is located to the west of Paris, 48.4 km (30.1 mi) from the centre of the capital. Mantes-la-Jolie is a subprefecture of Yvelines.

== History ==
Historical coat of arms of Mantes-la-Jolie from the Late Middle Age until 1943)

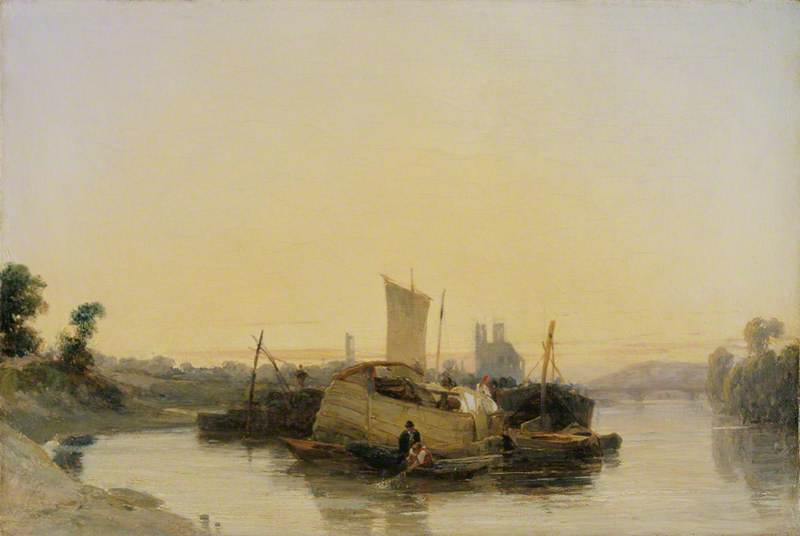
On the Seine near Mantes by Richard Parkes Bonington, 1825

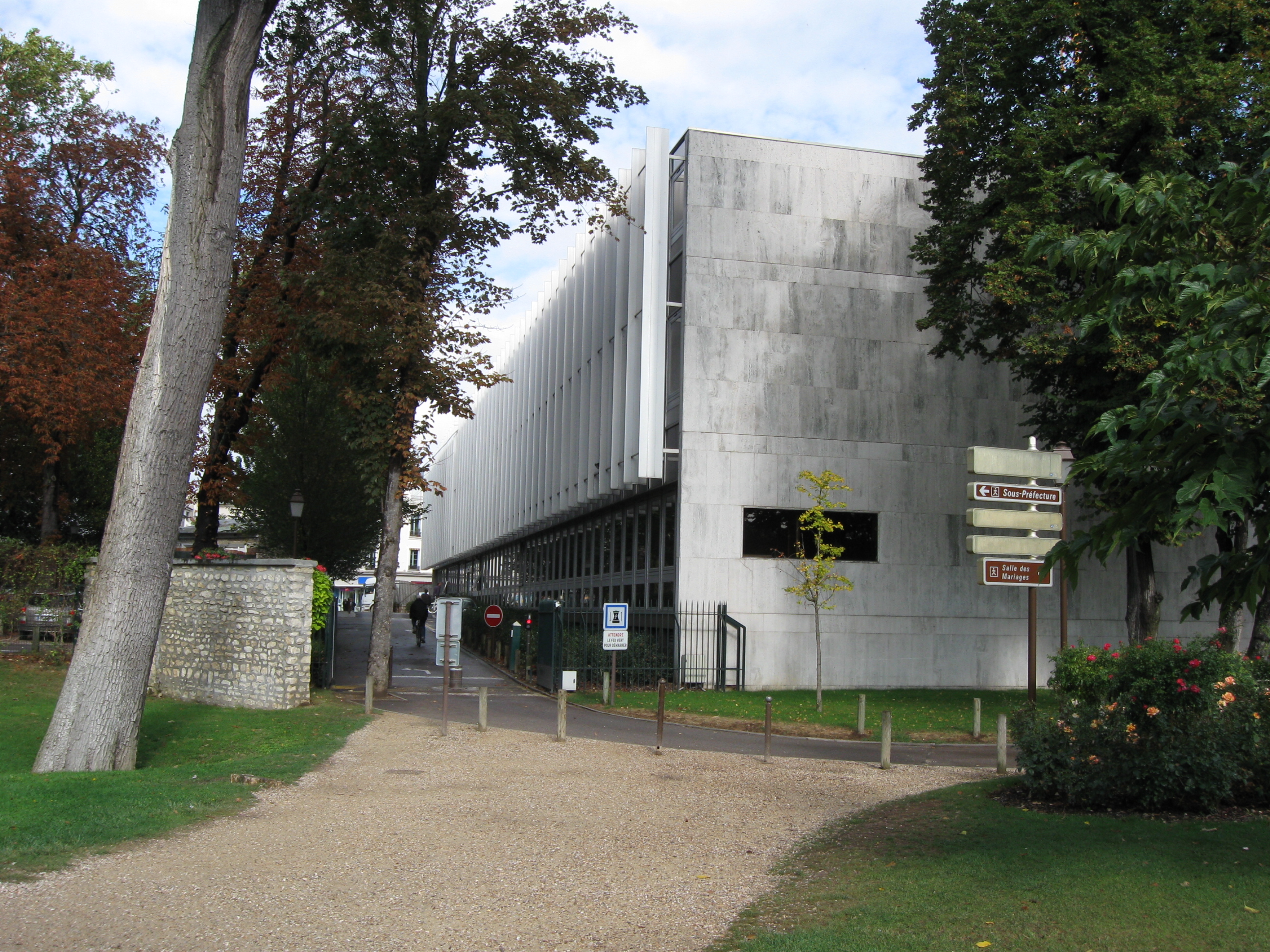
The Hôtel de Ville

Mantes was halfway between the centres of power of the dukes of Normandy at Rouen and the Kings of France in Paris. Along with most of northern France, the city changed hands frequently in the Hundred Years' War. Philip Augustus died in Mantes on 14 July 1223.

The Hôtel de Ville was officially opened in 1972.

Louis XIV instituted the manufacture of musical instruments in Mantes, and it was chosen as the centre of brass and woodwind instrument manufacture. In the 19th century, painters were attracted to the town, particularly Corot, whose paintings of the bridge and the cathedral are celebrated. Prokofiev spent the summer of 1920 there orchestrating the ballet Chout.

Originally officially called Mantes-sur-Seine (meaning "Mantes on the Seine"), Mantes merged with the commune of Gassicourt in 1930 and the commune born of the merger was called Mantes-Gassicourt.

Mantes was the location of the first allied bridgehead across the Seine on 19 August 1944, by General Patton's 3rd Army. Major rebuilding was needed after the war.

On 7 May 1953, the commune of Mantes-Gassicourt was officially renamed Mantes-la-Jolie (meaning "Mantes the pretty"), allegedly in reference to a letter of King Henry IV addressed to his mistress Gabrielle d'Estrées who resided in Mantes: "I am on my way to Mantes, my pretty" (French: je viens à Mantes, ma jolie).

== Art ==
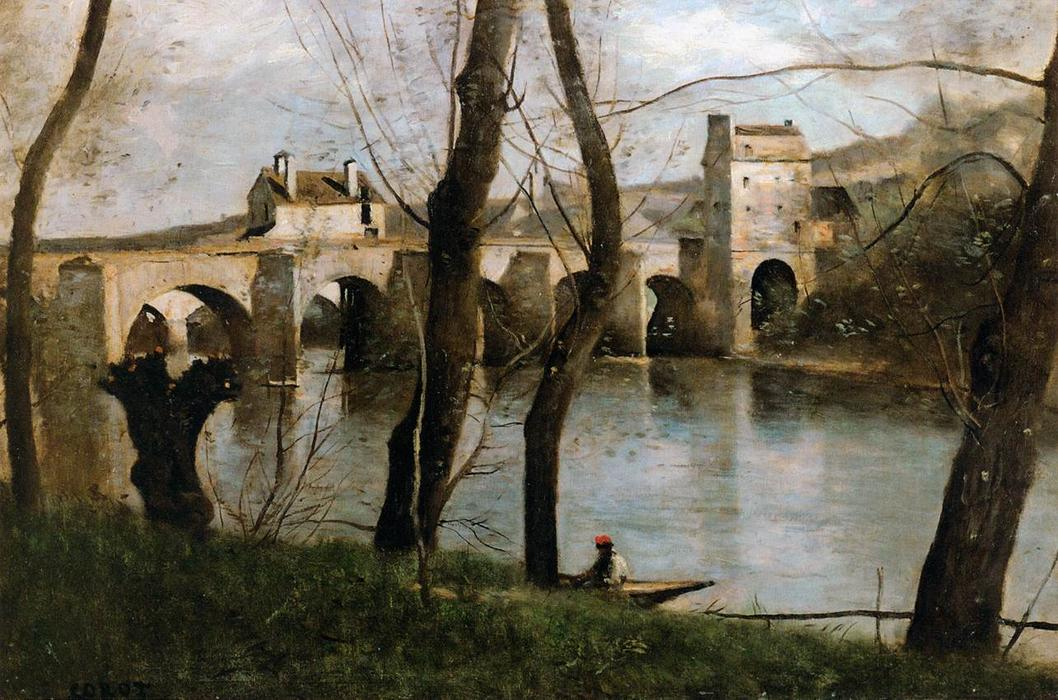
Jean-Baptiste-Camille Corot - Le pont de Mantes

At the end of the 19th century, Impressionist painters like Pierre-Auguste Renoir, Édouard Manet and Claude Monet came to paint the Seine River which crosses the town. Jean Batiste Corot painting of the Old Mantes bridge is shown at the Louvres.

== Population ==
Inhabitants are called Mantais in French. The population data in the table and graph below refer to the commune of Mantes-la-Jolie proper, in its geography at the given years. The commune of Mantes-la-Jolie absorbed the former communes of Gassicourt in 1930.

Mantes-la-Jolie has a significant Muslim population, consisting mainly of North Africans, Arabs, Turks, and Sub-Saharan Africans. Many Muslims in Mantes-la-Jolie experience disillusionment, high levels of poverty and unemployment. Val Fourré is a low-income housing estate occupied almost entirely by Arabs and African migrants. Over one-in-three residents in the town is an immigrant, and 27% of the town does not have French citizenship as of 2019.

Historical population

| Year | Pop. | ±% p.a. |
|---|---|---|
| 1793 | 4,803 | — |
| 1800 | 3,800 | −3.29% |
| 1806 | 3,976 | +0.76% |
| 1821 | 3,811 | −0.28% |
| 1831 | 4,148 | +0.85% |
| 1836 | 3,818 | −1.64% |
| 1841 | 4,280 | +2.31% |
| 1846 | 4,400 | +0.55% |
| 1851 | 4,374 | −0.12% |
| 1856 | 5,046 | +2.90% |
| 1861 | 5,372 | +1.26% |
| 1866 | 5,345 | −0.10% |
| 1872 | 5,697 | +1.07% |
| 1876 | 5,649 | −0.21% |
| 1881 | 6,056 | +1.40% |
| 1886 | 6,607 | +1.76% |
| 1891 | 7,032 | +1.25% |
| 1896 | 8,015 | +2.65% |
| 1901 | 8,034 | +0.05% |

| Year | Pop. | ±% p.a. |
|---|---|---|
| 1906 | 8,329 | +0.72% |
| 1911 | 8,821 | +1.15% |
| 1921 | 9,329 | +0.56% |
| 1926 | 9,944 | +1.29% |
| 1931 | 13,865 | +6.87% |
| 1936 | 13,978 | +0.16% |
| 1946 | 13,181 | −0.59% |
| 1954 | 15,155 | +1.76% |
| 1962 | 18,905 | +2.80% |
| 1968 | 26,062 | +5.50% |
| 1975 | 42,465 | +7.22% |
| 1982 | 43,564 | +0.37% |
| 1990 | 45,087 | +0.43% |
| 1999 | 43,672 | −0.35% |
| 2007 | 42,916 | −0.22% |
| 2012 | 43,515 | +0.28% |
| 2017 | 44,299 | +0.36% |
| 2023 | 43,526 | −0.29% |

Source: EHESS and INSEE (1968-2023)

The city is divided into four districts each with a characteristic urban form:

- Centre-ville: city center, a dense and commercial area
- Gassicourt: residential area
- Val Fourré: large housing district
- Hautes Garennes: a non-urbanized area

== Sights ==
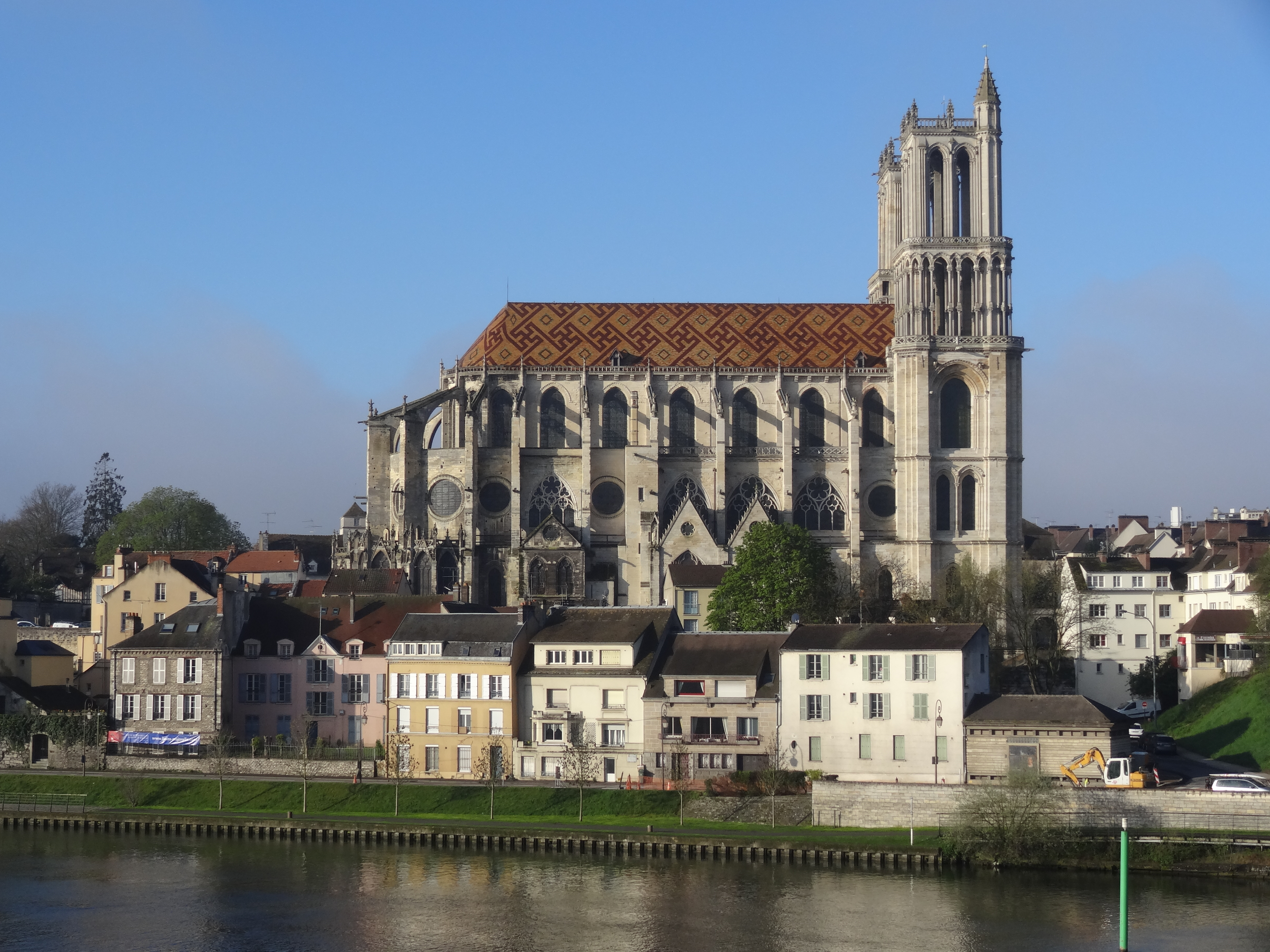
Notre Dame de Mantes

The main monument in Mantes is the church of Notre-Dame dating back to 12th century. A previous church was burnt down by William the Conqueror together with the rest of the town, at the capture of which he lost his life in 1087. Modern bridges link Mantes with the town of Limay on the other side of the river.

== Economy ==
Mantes is home to small businesses working on concrete and chemical processing, but is inevitably drawn into the economic area of nearby Paris.

It is historically and at present a center of musical instrument manufacturing. The well known Buffet Crampon woodwind factory is located in the neighbourhood city of Mantes-la-Ville.

== Transportation ==
Mantes-la-Jolie is served by two stations on the Transilien Paris-Saint-Lazare and Transilien Paris-Montparnasse suburban rail lines: Mantes-Station and Mantes-la-Jolie. The Mantes-la-Jolie station is also served by TGV trains towards Le Havre, and Cherbourg.

== Education ==
The municipality has nineteen public preschools, sixteen public elementary schools, six public junior high schools, two public senior high schools/sixth form colleges, and a private secondary school.

Public junior high schools:

- Collège André Chénier
- Collège Paul Cézanne
- Collège Jules Ferry
- Collège Louis Pasteur
- Collège de Gassicourt
- Collège Georges Clemenceau

Public senior high schools:

- Lycée Saint-Exupéry
- Lycée Polyvalent Jean Rostand

Private secondary schools:

- Collège-Lycée Notre-Dame

Colleges and universities:

- University Institute of Technology of Mantes en Yvelines
- Versailles Saint-Quentin-en-Yvelines University

== International relations ==
Mantes-la-Jolie is twinned with:

- Hillingdon, England, United Kingdom
- Maia, Portugal
- Schleswig, Germany

== Notable people ==
- Nicolas Bernier (1664–1734), composer
- Audrey Fleurot (born 1977), actress
- Faudel (born 1978), singer
- Benoit Poher (born 1979), singer
- Jules Tannery (1848–1910), mathematician
- Haoua Kessely (born 1988), athlete
- Angelo Tsagarakis (born 1984), basketball player
- Sandy Casar (born 1979), cyclist
- Oumar N'Diaye (born 1985), footballer
- Moussa Sow (born 1986), footballer
- Omar Kossoko (born 1988), footballer
- Hamady Tamboura (born 1989), footballer
- Kama Massampu (born 1991), footballer
- Kenji Mboma Dem (born 2002), footballer
- Opa Nguette (born 1994), footballer
- Nicolas Pépé (born 1995), footballer
- Enock Kwateng (born 1997), footballer
- Flávio Gonçalves (born 1997), footballer
- Jonathan Bumbu (born 1999), footballer
- Claudine Mendy (born 1990), handball player
- Michel Leclère (born 1946), racing driver
- Saïd Hireche (born 1985), rugby player
- Haby Niare (born 1993), taekwondo

== See also ==
- Communes of the Yvelines department
