= Saint-Étienne-le-Laus =

- Commune
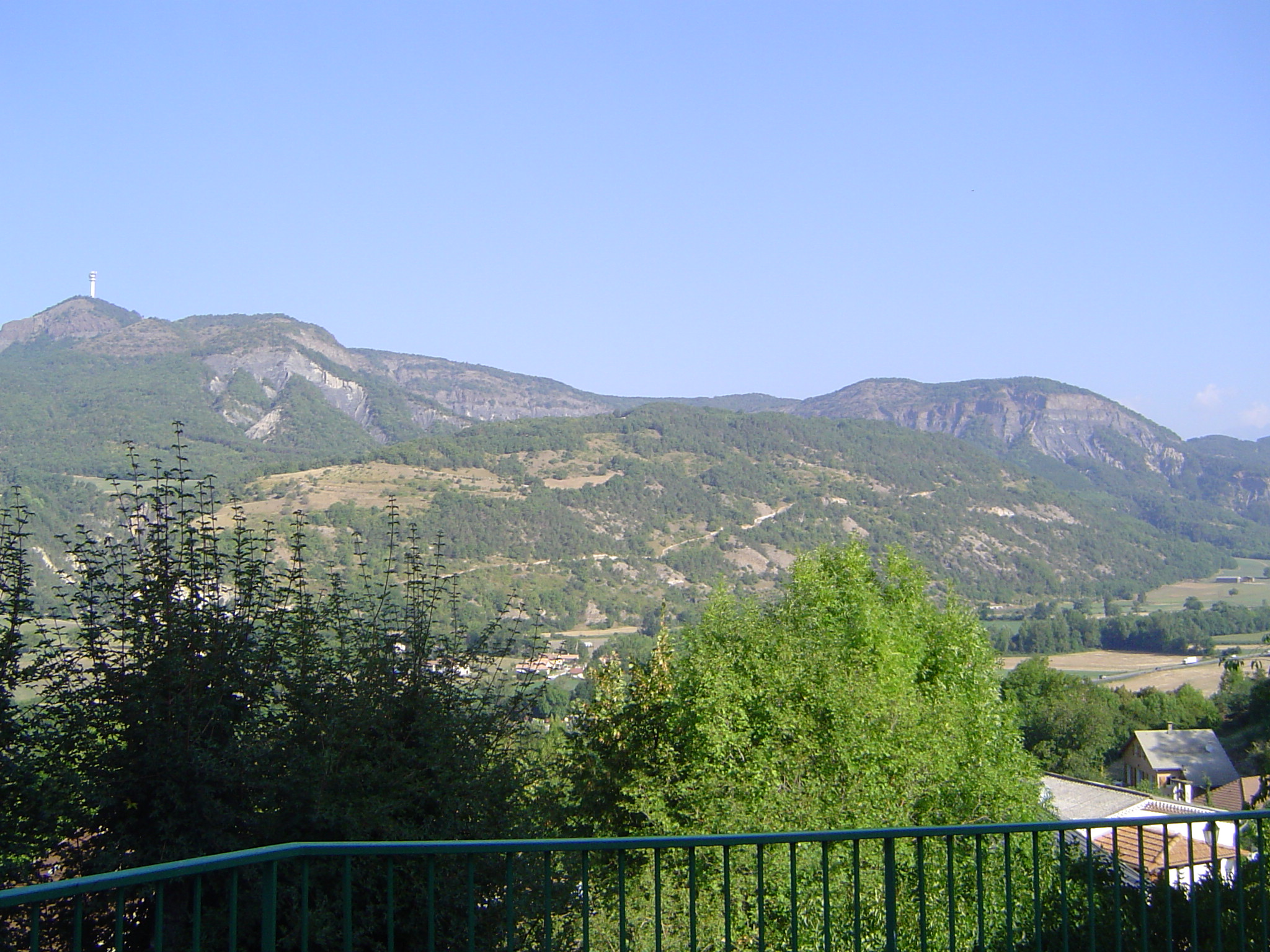
- A view from the church of Saint-Étienne-le-Laus

- Coat of arms
- Location of Saint-Étienne-le-Laus
- Location within France Location within Provence-Alpes-Côte d'Azur
- Coordinates: 44°30′11″N 6°09′46″E
- Country: France
- Region: Provence-Alpes-Côte d'Azur
- Department: Hautes-Alpes
- Arrondissement: Gap
- Canton: Tallard
- Intercommunality: Serre-Ponçon Val d'Avance

Government
  - Mayor (2026–32): Marie-José Garnier
- Area^{1}: 8.66 km^{2} (3.34 sq mi)
- Elevation: 735 m (2,411 ft)
- Highest elevation: 1,266 m (4,154 ft)
- Lowest elevation: 699 m (2,293 ft)
- Population (2023): 346
  - Density: 40.0/km^{2} (103/sq mi)
- Time zone: UTC+01:00 (CET)
  - Summer (DST): UTC+02:00 (CEST)
- INSEE/Postal code: 05140 /05130
- ^{1} French Land Register data, which excludes lakes, ponds, glaciers > 1 km^{2} (0.386 sq mi or 247 acres) and river estuaries.

Saint-Étienne-le-Laus (French pronunciation: [sɛ̃t‿etjɛn lə lo]; Vivaro-Alpine: Sant Estève lo Laus) is a commune in the Hautes-Alpes department in southeastern France.

== History ==
Besides being a popular vacation spot, the region is probably best known for the lengthy series of Marian apparitions which are said to have occurred there between 1664 and 1718, reported by shepherdess Benoîte Rencurel. The church that was established around these Marian apparitions, the Basilica of Notre Dame du Laus, has been described as "one of the most hidden and yet powerful treasures in the history of Europe". The apparitions were officially recognized by the diocesan authority of the Roman Catholic Church on 18 September 1665.

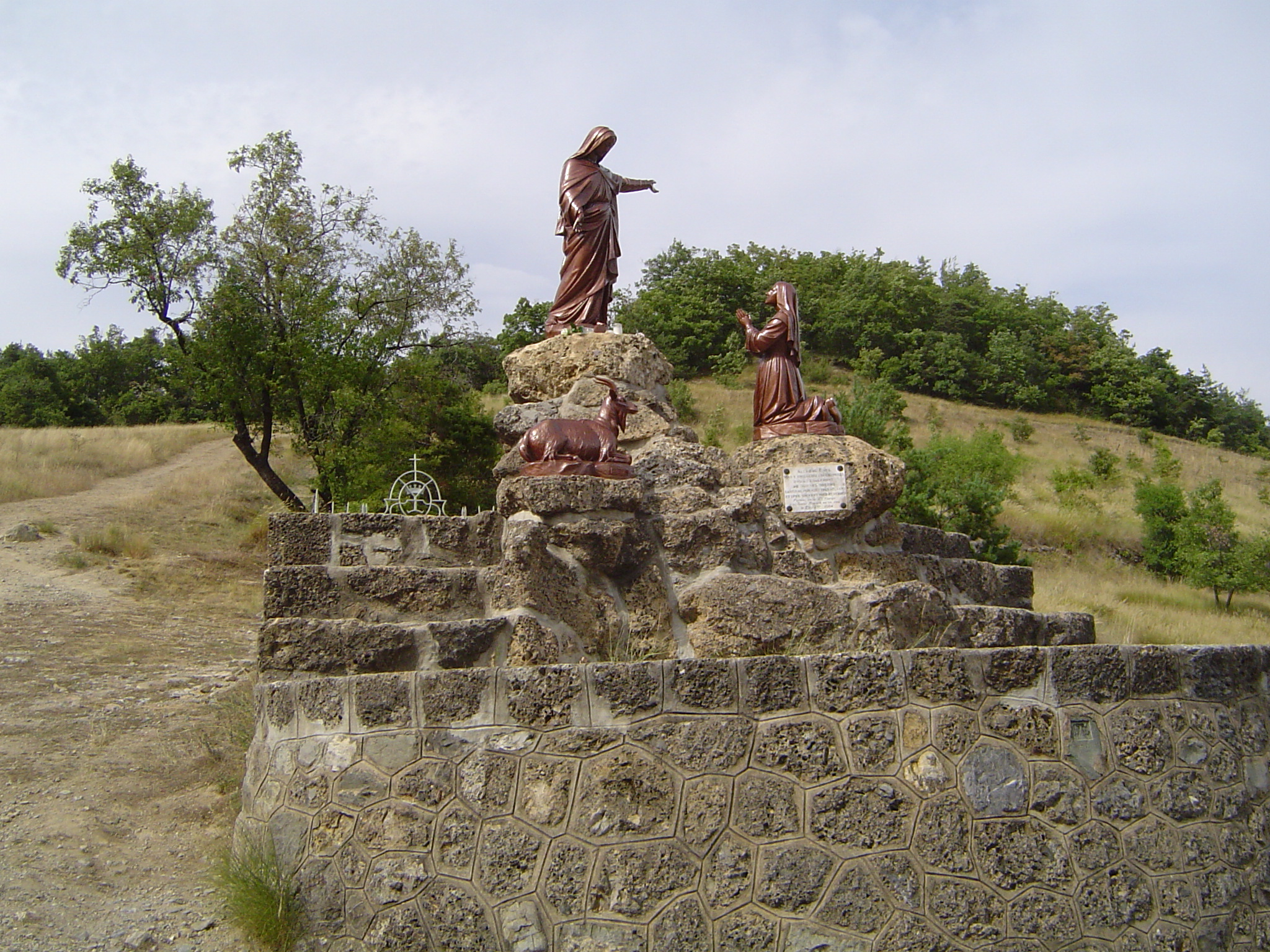
The Monument of Pindreau, in Saint-Étienne-le-Laus, depicting the apparition of the Virgin Mary to Benoîte Rencurel

The "Laus" (formerly spelled "Laux") in the name of the commune, Saint-Étienne-le-Laus, and that of the church, Our Lady of Laus, means "lake", in the Alpine Provençal dialect, which was a local derivation from the Latin word "lacus". On votive offerings and some older stones, the indication is Latin "Sancta Maria Lacensis", which means "St. Mary of the Lake".

Starting in 1664, and lasting for 54 years, in and around Laus, Benoîte Rencurel saw the Virgin Mary, also known as Our Lady of Laus or Notre Dame du Laus, along with Christ on the Cross, Saint Maurice, Saint Barbara, Saint Joseph, Saint Gervais and Saint Protais, the Child Jesus, Saint Catherine of Siena, the angels and the devil. As a result of these appearances, within a few years, a crowd of pilgrims arrived at Laus, estimated at 130,000 within the first two years. In 1666, construction was started on a church to enclose the little chapel at Laus where the Virgin Mary had appeared to Benoite Rencurel.

On 4 May 2008 Bishop Jean Marie di Falco, the Bishop of Gap and Embrun, officially recognized the supernatural nature of the apparitions of the Virgin Mary to Benoîte Rencurel. This recognition by the Catholic Church marks the first approved Marian apparition in the 21st century, and the first in France since Lourdes was recognized, a century and a half ago. Consistent with that recognition, Bishop Jean-Michel di Falco has supported the beatification of Benoîte Rencurel. Under the auspices of Bishop Rene Combal, six experts (a theologian, a historian, a biblical scholar, a psychoanalyst, a psychologist, and a magistrate) have studied for several years the historical, and scientific and medical facts, from manuscripts written contemporaneously with Benoîte Rencurel's life.

The basilica today at Saint-Étienne-le-Laus, dedicated to Our Lady of Laus, contains:

- The Chapel of Good Encounter ("Bon Rencontre"), the original chapel in Laus,
- The 18th century marble statue by Honoré Pellé (alternatively, Honoré Pela) of Notre Dame du Laus, in which Mary holds in one hand the child Jesus, and in the other an apple, as she is the mediatrix between sin and salvation (this statue was crowned in the 19th century),
- The oil lamp of the sanctuary, from which the healing oil of Laus is drawn,
- The tomb of Benoîte Rencurel, immediately in front of the Chapel of Good Meeting,
- 14 paintings showing the life of Benoîte Rencurel, including her visions of St. Meurice, the angels, and the Blessed Virgin Mary,
- The statue of Our Lady of Grace ("Notre-Dame des Grâces") that is carried in procession, and
- The rounded apse chapel ("la Rotonde"), which contains a portrait of Benoîte Rencurel.

Two items that are unique to Our Lady of Laus are worth mentioning in more detail. The first is the oil from the sanctuary lamp. The lamp glows continuously in the sanctuary in front of the tabernacle. Oil is the means chosen by the Blessed Virgin Mary at Laus to grant physical and spiritual healings. Many healings (and alleviation of symptoms) have been reported by people who apply oil from the lamp to the afflicted area, with faith and in prayer to the intercession of Our Lady of Laus. The oil has been described as having the equivalent healing powers of the waters of Lourdes. The oil is free, and is sent to anyone who requests it from the website of the Sanctuary of Our Lady of Laus (in French only at this time).

Laus is also a place of famed "suave odors" or "exquisite fragrances". The inhalations of these scents are reported to bring a sudden, calm joy to the senses. The beneficiaries of these fragrances retain a deep impression from the experiences which often encourages them to better prayers. It was said of Benoîte Rencurel that she always smelled these perfumes when she saw the Blessed Virgin Mary, and the scents, which impregnated everything, persisted even after the apparition of Our Lady ended. Indeed, the sculptor Honoré Pellé (alternatively, Honoré Pela) gave the marble statue of Notre Dame du Laus, noted above, after being immersed in these exquisite fragrances during a pilgrimage to Laus.

== Geography ==
=== Climate ===
Saint-Étienne-le-Laus has a humid continental climate (Köppen climate classification Dfb). The average annual temperature in Saint-Étienne-le-Laus is 7.0 °C (44.6 °F). The average annual rainfall is 1,092.7 mm (43.02 in) with October as the wettest month. The temperatures are highest on average in July, at around 16.1 °C (61.0 °F), and lowest in January, at around −1.6 °C (29.1 °F). The highest temperature ever recorded in Saint-Étienne-le-Laus was 34.4 °C (93.9 °F) on 7 July 2015; the coldest temperature ever recorded was −25.1 °C (−13.2 °F) on 5 February 2012.

Climate data for Saint-Étienne-le-Laus (1981–2010 averages, extremes 1986−present)
Month	Jan	Feb	Mar	Apr	May	Jun	Jul	Aug	Sep	Oct	Nov	Dec	Year
Record high °C (°F)	15.1 (59.2)	18.2 (64.8)	22.0 (71.6)	24.1 (75.4)	29.8 (85.6)	33.5 (92.3)	34.4 (93.9)	34.1 (93.4)	30.0 (86.0)	26.3 (79.3)	20.0 (68.0)	15.3 (59.5)	34.4 (93.9)
Mean daily maximum °C (°F)	3.7 (38.7)	4.9 (40.8)	8.5 (47.3)	11.5 (52.7)	16.7 (62.1)	20.6 (69.1)	23.8 (74.8)	23.4 (74.1)	18.4 (65.1)	13.9 (57.0)	7.1 (44.8)	3.7 (38.7)	13.1 (55.6)
Daily mean °C (°F)	−1.6 (29.1)	−0.8 (30.6)	2.5 (36.5)	5.4 (41.7)	10.4 (50.7)	13.6 (56.5)	16.1 (61.0)	16.0 (60.8)	11.8 (53.2)	8.2 (46.8)	2.4 (36.3)	−0.9 (30.4)	7.0 (44.6)
Mean daily minimum °C (°F)	−6.9 (19.6)	−6.5 (20.3)	−3.5 (25.7)	−0.6 (30.9)	4.0 (39.2)	6.6 (43.9)	8.5 (47.3)	8.5 (47.3)	5.2 (41.4)	2.5 (36.5)	−2.3 (27.9)	−5.5 (22.1)	0.9 (33.6)
Record low °C (°F)	−25.0 (−13.0)	−25.1 (−13.2)	−19.5 (−3.1)	−11.0 (12.2)	−5.0 (23.0)	−2.7 (27.1)	1.0 (33.8)	−0.3 (31.5)	−4.5 (23.9)	−9.2 (15.4)	−20.0 (−4.0)	−19.9 (−3.8)	−25.1 (−13.2)
Average precipitation mm (inches)	81.3 (3.20)	61.1 (2.41)	69.9 (2.75)	104.5 (4.11)	104.6 (4.12)	77.5 (3.05)	54.8 (2.16)	68.7 (2.70)	101.6 (4.00)	138.3 (5.44)	129.2 (5.09)	101.2 (3.98)	1,092.7 (43.02)
Average precipitation days (≥ 1.0 mm)	9.0	7.5	8.1	10.0	11.5	8.1	6.0	7.4	7.1	9.6	9.2	9.4	103.1
Source: Meteociel

== Population ==
Historical population
Year	Pop.	±% p.a.
1968	153	—
1975	157	+0.37%
1982	149	−0.74%
1990	177	+2.18%
1999	215	+2.18%
2007	285	+3.59%
2012	306	+1.43%
2017	284	−1.48%
2023	346	+3.35%
Source: INSEE

== See also ==
- Communes of the Hautes-Alpes department
