= Benoîte Rencurel =

French shepherdess and visionary (1647–1718)

Venerable Benoîte Rencurel TOSD
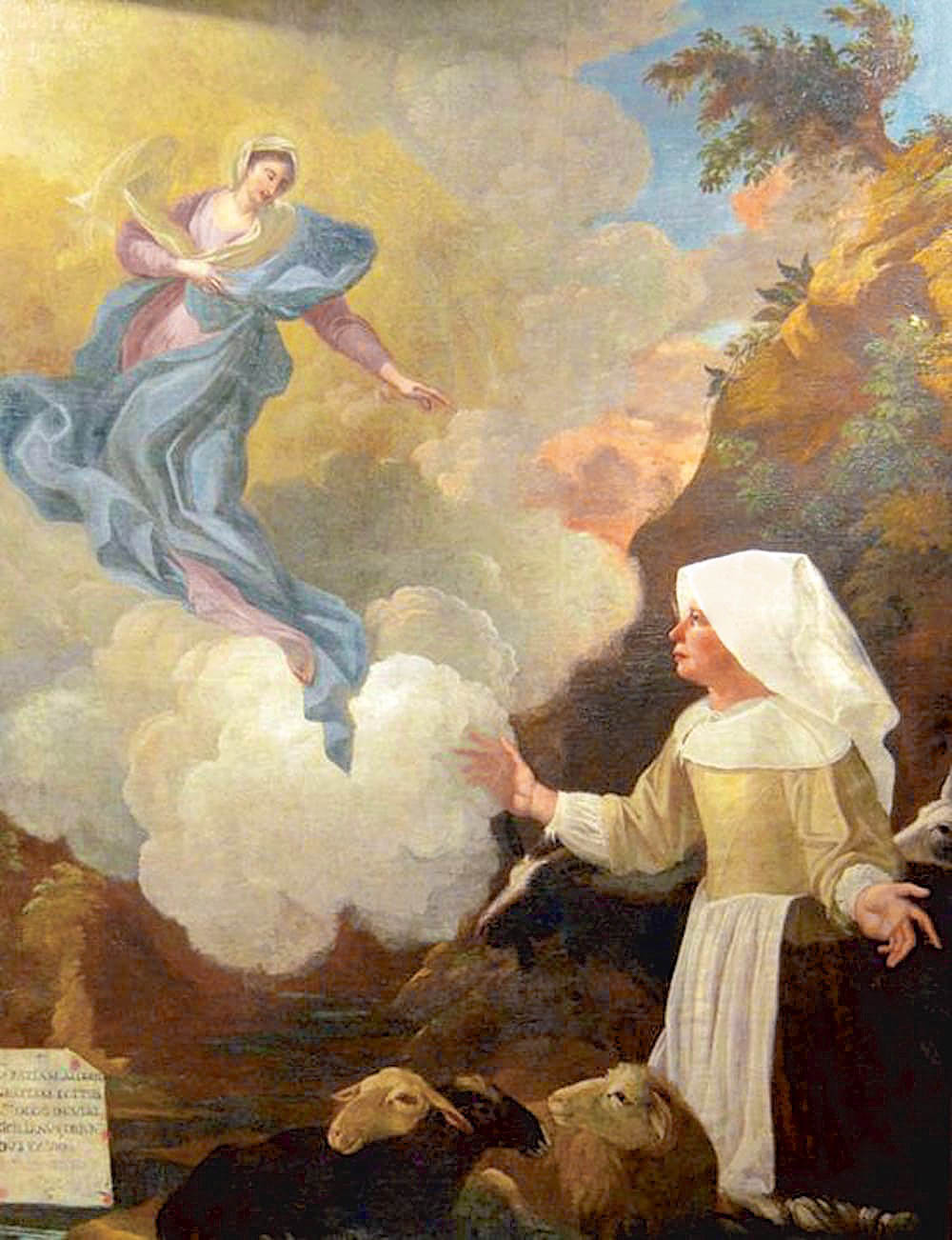
- Painting with the apparition of Our Lady of Laus to Benoîte Rencurel
- Born: 16 September 1647; Saint-Étienne-le-Laus, France
- Died: 25 December 1718 (aged 71)

Benoîte Rencurel (1647–1718) was a shepherdess from Saint-Étienne-le-Laus, France who is said to have seen apparitions from the Virgin Mary from 1664 to 1718. Also she is said to have borne stigmata. The apparitions became known as Our Lady of Laus, and the site receives thousands of pilgrim visits a year. On 4 May 2008, Bishop Jean-Michel di Falco of the Diocese of Gap officially recognized the apparitions of the Virgin Mary to Benoite Rencurel at the Sanctuary of Laus in the area of Hautes-Alpes, France.

== Life ==
Benoîte Rencurel was born on September 16, 1647, in the little town of Saint-Étienne d'Avançon, in the southern Alps. Her parents lived modestly from the works of their hands. Her father, Guillaume Rencurel, died when Benoîte was seven years old. For the widow and her daughters, his death would lead to material destitution. There was no school in Saint-Etienne d'Avançon and so Benoîte never learned to read or write. At the age of twelve, she found work as a shepherdess.

In a homily during a Mass at the Marian basilica in the town of Laus, Archbishop Georges Pontier of Marseille, France, said that Rencurel had first seen Mary after being guided by a pervasive scent of violets near her home in Saint-Etienne d'Avancon in May 1664 and later, in 1673, she experienced a vision of Christ bleeding on the village cross.

In September the Blessed Mother directed Rencurel to " Notre Dame de la Bonne Rencontre", an abandoned chapel in the village of Le Laus, and asked for a church to be built, with a house for priests to take confessions.

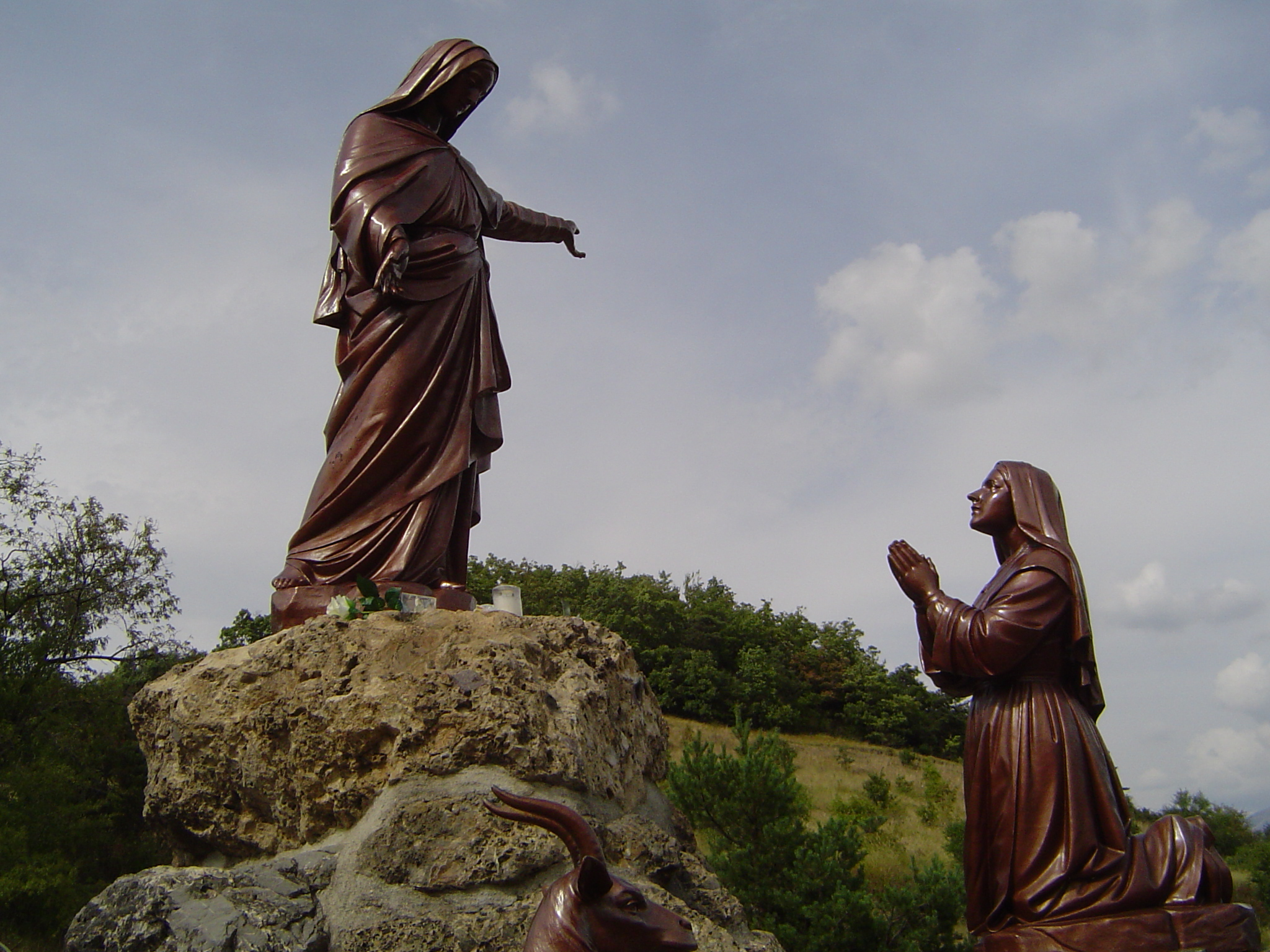
The Monument of Pindreau, in Saint-Étienne-le-Laus, depicting the apparition of the Virgin Mary to Benoîte Rencurel.

The apparitions received diocesan approval and a new church was built. In 1672, she took a modest house nearby. She became a Third Order Dominican and ministered to pilgrims and penitents as a Dominican tertiary in Laus.

In 1692, troops of the Duke of Savoy invaded the area and she and the priests of the shrine took refuge in Marseille. Upon their return, they found the place devastated. With the arrival of Jansenist priests, who tried to pressure her to leave Laus and join a religious community, she was banned from daily Mass. At the shrine in Laus, Benoîte is said to have had the gift of reading hearts and so many people came to ask her advice that she had to attend mass through a small window in the gallery of the Church. In 1711, with a new rotation of priests, her situation improved, but by then she was increasingly frail. She claimed to receive visions of Jesus in His passion from 1669 to 1679. She died on Christmas Day 1718, and is buried in front of the main altar of the sanctuary.

== Veneration ==
The site now draws 120,000 pilgrims annually. Numerous physical healings have also been associated with the site, especially when oil from a lamp is applied on the wounds according to the directives the Virgin Mary gave to Rencurel.

The very modern message of Benoite, Bishop di Falco stated, is "to live heart to heart with God in prayer, enter deeper into conversion where we are reconciled with ourselves, with others and with God, and live your mission where your life is, in everyday community and joy."

The cause for Benoîte's beatification was opened on 7 September 1871, and she was given the title Servant of God by Pope Pius IX. Her spiritual writings were approved by theologians on 11 March 1895. On 3 April 2009, Pope Benedict XVI declared Benoîte venerable.
