= List of Marian apparitions =

List of notable alleged supernatural appearances by Mary, mother of Jesus

Marian apparitions are reported supernatural appearances by Mary, The Mother of God. Below is a list of alleged events concerning notable Marian apparitions, which have either been approved by a major Christian church, or which retain a significant following despite the absence of official approval or despite an official determination of inauthenticity. While a number of Marian apparitions are approved or received positive judgments, many receive no-decision or negative judgments from the church.

== Catholic Church ==
According to norms of the Catholic Church which have been in effect since the Council of Trent in the 16th century, the initial responsibility of evaluating the merits of any purported apparition falls to the bishop of the area in which the events allegedly occurred. If, after an investigation, the bishop determines that the apparition constitutes an authentic supernatural appearance of the Blessed Virgin Mary, then the apparition is considered approved for the entire Catholic Church, unless his successor or the Holy See were to contradict his decision.

On May 18, 2024, the Dicastery for the Doctrine of the Faith's Prefect, Víctor Manuel Fernández, published a 2024 religious text signed by Pope Francis which replaced the 1978 Norms regarding the manner of proceeding in the discernment of presumed apparitions or revelations rulings. It sets new norms and guidelines for Catholic bishops in discerning claims of private revelation such as Marian apparitions. Fernández enumerated six possible conclusions for alleged supernatural phenomena discernment. "Nihil obstat" substitutes Declaration of supernatural authenticity. A Bishop's canonical investigation and decision requires prior submission to the Dicastery before publication.

=== Positive judgment ===
The apparitions in this category have been judged to be "worthy of belief".

==== Approved, with widespread veneration endorsed by the Holy See ====
A distinction is sometimes made between apparitions that are "Vatican approved" and those that are not. However, by the now abrogated Norms regarding the manner of proceeding in the discernment of presumed apparitions or revelations, the only formal mechanisms for Holy See approval of an apparition would be the pope approving an apparition that had occurred in the Diocese of Rome, or the pope approving an apparition against the will of the local bishop, neither of which has happened to date. Even in cases in which the Congregation for the Doctrine of the Faith cooperates with an investigation that yields a positive result, the consequent approval derives its authority from the local bishop, not from the Holy See. Because approval by the Holy See can therefore only be claimed based on informal indicators of endorsement, lists of "Vatican-approved Marian apparitions" vary widely depending on the criteria used. The criterion used here is that the Holy See must have approved the widespread veneration of the apparition by inscribing it on a liturgical calendar besides that of the particular diocese in which the apparition occurred.

Associated Marian titles	Years	Location	Seers	Approval	Feast day
Our Lady of Guadalupe	1531	Tepeyac, Mexico (then the Kingdom of New Spain)	Juan Diego Cuauhtlatoatzin; Juan Bernardino	1555	December 12 in the General Roman Calendar
Juan Diego, an Aztec who had recently converted to the Catholic faith, saw an apparition of Mary early in the morning on December 9, 1531, during which Mary asked that a church be built in the site of the apparition. The local bishop did not believe his story. In response, during another appearance to Juan Diego three days later, after also appearing to Diego's sick uncle Juan Bernardino, Our Lady imprinted an image of herself on Juan Diego's cloak (tilma). The cloak is on display at the Basilica of Our Lady of Guadalupe in Mexico City. Over the years, Our Lady of Guadalupe became a symbol of the Catholic faith in Mexico and the Mexican diaspora.
Our Lady of the Miraculous Medal Our Lady of Graces	1830	Rue du Bac in Paris, France	Catherine Labouré	1836; Archbishop Hyacinthe-Louis de Quélen; Archdiocese of Paris	November 27 in the Roman Calendar for Venezuela and the Vincentian orders
Catherine Labouré, a novice with the Daughters of Charity of Saint Vincent de Paul, reported several apparitions of Mary in the chapel of her convent. On July 18, 1830, she was awakened and led to the chapel by a child. There, the Virgin Mary appeared to her and revealed that God wished to entrust her with a mission. Mary also said to her that "times were evil" and foretold sorrows for France and the world. On November 27, 1830, Catherine reported another apparition, where Mary showed her specific visions and requested to "have a Medal struck after this model". She asked her to take these images to her confessor, and that "all who wear them will receive great graces". The first medals were produced in 1832 and became widely known as the Miraculous Medal, due to the many miracles attributed to the medal. The front of the medal depicts Mary as she appeared to Catherine, while the reverse design includes the letter M under a cross, along with the Sacred Heart and the Immaculate Heart of Mary.
Our Lady of La Salette	1846	Mount Sous-Les Baisses, La Salette-Fallavaux, France	Mélanie Calvat; Maximin Giraud	September 19, 1851; Bishop Philibert de Bruillard; Diocese of Grenoble	September 19 in the Roman Calendar for France
Two shepherd children reported seeing an apparition of Mary, who was weeping because of disrespect shown to the Lord's Day and to the Lord's name. She entrusted one secret to each of the two children, which they wrote down and delivered to Pope Pius IX.
Our Lady of Lourdes The Immaculate Conception	1858	Lourdes, France	Bernadette Soubirous	January 18, 1862; Bishop Bertrand-Sévère Laurence; Diocese of Tarbes	February 11 in the General Roman Calendar
A 14-year-old shepherd girl named Bernadette Soubirous reported seeing Mary appear to her while she was out gathering firewood in the countryside. Mary identified herself as "the Immaculate Conception" and told Bernadette of the location of a spring with many miraculous healings associated with its waters. Since 1862, more than sixty medical cures associated with Lourdes have been certified as "miraculous" by the Catholic Church, which established its own Medical Bureau in 1883 to review and evaluate claims of cures. An independent study of cures published during 2012 concluded that some of the cures were "currently beyond our ken but still impressive, incredibly effective, and awaiting a scientific explanation."
Our Lady of Knock	1879	Knock, Ireland (then part of the United Kingdom)	Group of 15 people	1879; Archbishop John MacHale; Archdiocese of Tuam	August 17 in the Roman Calendar for Ireland
On August 21, 1879, a group of 15 men, women, and children, ranging in age from 5 to 75, reported seeing an apparition behind their church, against the back wall, of an altar with a lamb on it (understood to represent Jesus), surrounded by a multitude of angels. Off to the side in prayer stood Mary, Joseph, and St. John (with St. John dressed as a bishop). Because Mary was among those seen, the apparition is classified as Marian, although the simultaneous appearance of Jesus, Mary, Joseph, John, and numerous angels makes it unique among this category. A further distinctive characteristic is that this apparition was silent: no verbal messages were given. The apparition lasted for an hour and a half.
Our Lady of Fátima Our Lady of the Rosary The Immaculate Heart of Mary	1917	Cova da Iria, Fátima, Portugal	Lúcia Santos; Jacinta Marto; Francisco Marto	October 13, 1930; Bishop José Alves Correia da Silva; Diocese of Leiria	May 13 in the General Roman Calendar
Three shepherd children reported seeing apparitions of an angel (who identified himself as the Guardian Angel of Portugal) followed by apparitions of Mary. Mary revealed to the children three secrets: first, the reality of hell and the means of saving people from it through personal sacrifices and Acts of reparation; second, a prediction of future upheavals (beginning with World War II), the spiritual means of ending them (a Consecration of Russia and Communions of reparation on First Saturdays), and a prediction of an eventual "triumph of the Immaculate Heart of Mary"; third, an obscure vision of future persecution of the Catholic Church. The apparitions culminated with the Miracle of the Sun, an astronomical phenomenon witnessed by a crowd of approximately 70,000 people, and even by others located miles away. All nine popes since the apparitions – Benedict XV, Pius XI, Pius XII, John XXIII, Paul VI, John Paul I, John Paul II, Benedict XVI and Francis – have indicated their belief in the authenticity of the apparitions. Pope John Paul II credited Our Lady of Fátima with saving his life after he was shot in Rome on May 13 feast day of the apparition in 1981, and donated the bullet that wounded him to the Sanctuary of Our Lady of Fátima. In 1925, eight years after the Fátima events, Lúcia, then Sister Lúcia, reported another set of related apparitions, which became known as the Pontevedra apparitions.

==== Approved ====
Below is a list of additional apparitions which have been approved by the local ordinary (i.e. the bishop assigned to the area in which the events allegedly occurred).

Associated Marian titles	Years	Location	Seers	Approval
Our Lady of Consolation in Leżajsk	1578	Leżajsk, Poland (then the Polish–Lithuanian Commonwealth )	Thomas Michalek	July 2, 1724 by Henryk Firlej, Bishop of Przemysl
Thomas Michalek, a woodcutter, was working in the forest when he saw a bright light, in which the Holy Virgin manifested herself. Speaking to him, the Virgin said: "Thomas, I chose this place. Here my Son will be loved and respected and whosoever shall call upon my intercession, will receive my blessing." Mary asked him to alert the authorities so that he might build a church. Thomas, scared, did nothing. The Virgin, then, appeared again, asking him to take action and end his silence. Thomas went to the authorities to tell the tale, but he was not believed and in fact was dragged to court by the parish priest of the town who found the claim ridiculous. Eventually a following grew and upon the death of the priest, the new parish priest built a small chapel.
Our Lady of the Good Event	1594–1634	Quito, Ecuador (then the Kingdom of Peru)	Mariana de Jesus Torres	1611; Bishop Salvador Ribera Avalos; Diocese of Quito
A religious sister, Mother Mariana de Jesus Torres, reported that the Virgin Mary appeared to her at the Conceptionist Convent in Quito, Ecuador, under the title "Nuestra Señora del Buen Suceso". According to Mother Mariana, Mary requested that a statue be made in her likeness and made several predictions, saying that the church and the world would enter into a period of crisis beginning in the mid-20th century, and that this period would be followed by a complete restoration. Although the phrase "Good Event" in the apparition title is also understood to refer to this prophesied restoration, the phrase, properly speaking, refers to the Purification of Mary and the Presentation of Jesus.
Our Lady of the Hens	1609	Pagani, Campania, Italy (then in the Kingdom of Naples)	11 different people	August 1786
Despite the first apparition is dated back to the 16th century, the Madonna of the Hens is said to have performed eight miracles in the years 1609–1610. It all began when a cripple, who had fallen asleep in front of a dressing room belonging to the ancient parish of San Felice, where the table found by the hens was kept, saw the Madonna in his sleep; she invited him to get up and throw away his crutches because he was healed. The evident miracle attracted general attention to the small oratory, and in a very short time there were new healings: between 1609 and 1610 there were seven other miracles that confirmed in the faithful the devotion to the 'Madonna of the Hens' in and out of the region. It was then decided the building of a more worthy church to welcome the faithful, and in 1610 Msgr. Lunadoro, bishop of Nocera de' Pagani, tells us that "thanks to the help of the devout people, who give large alms, a much more capable church is begun" to be built in the place where the hens had found the table, and Msgr. Stefano de Vicari, in his pastoral visit made in 1615, speaks of a 'newly built church' (Latin: ecclesia noviter erecta), namely the Shrine of Our Lady of the Hens. In August 1786 the diocesan bishop, Msgr. Benedetto dei Monti Sanfelice, published a decree with which the chapter of Saint Peter in the Vatican decided to solemnly crown the 'Madonna delle Galline' in gratitude for the protection of Mary to the population. The coronation ceremony took place in 1787.
Our Lady of Coromoto	8 September 1652	Guanare, Venezuela (then part of the Kingdom of New Spain	Cacique Coromoto, his wife, the chief and members of the Cospes tribe	September 11, 1952; Pope Pius XII
When the city of Guanare (capital of Portuguesa state) was founded in 1591, the Indian tribe who inhabited the region, the Cospes, fled to the northern jungle. When the Roman Catholic Church began to evangelize, its efforts were at first resisted. There is a legend that the Virgin Mary appeared twice to the chief of the local tribe, once in 1651 in a river canyon when she told him to be baptised, and again, when he was still refusing baptism, on September 8, 1652, when she appeared in his hut. This time he is said to have tried to grab her and she vanished, leaving behind a small painting of her.
Our Lady of Laus	1664–1718	Saint-Étienne-le-Laus, France	Benoîte Rencurel	May 4, 2008 (Note: Although news outlets widely reported the apparition as being "Vatican approved," the approval was given by the local bishop with the CDF's permission, not by the CDF directly.); Bishop Jean-Michel Di Falco; Diocese of Gap and Embrun
In May 1664, a young shepherdess named Benoîte Rencurel, 17 years old, reported that Saint Maurice appeared to her and said that she would see the Mother of God in a nearby valley. The next day, Benoîte went to this valley and saw a "beautiful lady", who later revealed her identity: "I am Lady Mary, the Mother of my very dear Son". Benoîte was then told to go to Laus and find a chapel there, "from which sweet scents will emanate". There, Mary appeared to her and said "I have asked my Son for this place for the conversion of sinners, and He has granted it to me". Mary asked for a sanctuary to be built, and charged Benoîte to welcome the pilgrims and to prepare them for the Sacrament of Penance, having received the gift of reading souls. Benoîte continued to receive apparitions of Mary for 54 years, until her death in 1718. The local archbishop at the time approved the public veneration of the initial apparitions in 1665, but the apparitions themselves were approved four centuries later, on May 5, 2008.
Our Lady of Champion	1859	Champion, Wisconsin, United States of America	Adele Brise	December 8, 2010; Bishop David L. Ricken; Diocese of Green Bay
In Robinsonville (now called Champion), Wisconsin, a young Belgian immigrant woman named Adele Brise was walking through a wooded area when she saw a beautiful woman standing between a maple and a hemlock tree. She saw the lady again on her way to Mass, and walked past her again. After Mass she told her priest about the apparition, and he told her to ask the Lady "In God's name, who are you and what do you want of me?" When Adele walked past the spot again, the Lady was there, and Adele asked what she was told by the priest. The Lady replied, "I am the Queen of Heaven who prays for the conversion of sinners." She gave Adele the mission to pray for sinners and teach the children of the area their Catechism, with the assurance, "Go and fear nothing, I will help you." Soon after, Adele's father built a small chapel between the trees, and later two more churches were built on the spot before the present brick church, built in 1942. Our Lady of Champion is the first approved apparition in the United States. In April 2023, the National Shrine of Our Lady of Good Help announced its official name change to The National Shrine of Our Lady of Champion.
Our Lady Help of Christians	1866	Jiříkov, Czech Republic (then the Kingdom of Bohemia, within the Austrian Empire)	Magdalene Kade	1885; Pope Leo XIII
A reported Marian vision occurred in the village of Filipov on 13 January 1866, where a bedridden woman, Magdalene Kade, was instantly healed after seeing the Virgin Mary. This event is a recognised 19th-century miracle, leading to the construction of a basilica
Our Lady of Pontmain Our Lady of Hope	1871	Pontmain, France	Eùgene Barbadette; Joseph Barbadette; Jeanne-Marie Lebossé; Françoise Richer	February 2, 1872; Bishop Casimir Wicart; Diocese of Laval
At the height of the Franco-Prussian War, Pontmain, a hamlet of about 500 inhabitants, found itself between the oncoming Prussian army and the city of Laval. While two boys, Joseph and Eugène, aged ten and twelve, were helping their father in the barn, Eugène saw in the night sky an apparition of a beautiful woman smiling at him; she was wearing a blue gown covered with golden stars, and a black veil under a golden crown. Joseph came to look and could see the lady as well. As a crowd gathered, two girls, Françoise Richer and Jeanne-Marie Lebosse, ages nine and eleven, reported seeing Mary as well, and described her in the same way. None of the adults, however, could see Mary, but only saw three stars forming a triangle. The crowd began praying the Rosary. The children saw a banner unfurl beneath the Lady with a message: "But pray, my children. God will hear you in time. My Son allows Himself to be touched." The apparition lasted about three hours. It was later discovered that the advance of the Prussian troops was halted at the same time that the apparition began; the general reported that the advance was blocked by a "Madonna".
Our Lady of Gietrzwałd	1877	Gietrzwałd, Poland (then part of the German Empire)	Stanisława Samulowska; Justyna Szafryńska	September 1, 1977; Bishop Józef Drzazga; Diocese of Warmia
A 13-year-old girl named Justyna Szafryńska reported that, while praying the Angelus on June 27, 1877, she saw a woman seated on a gold throne near a maple tree, accompanied by an angel. The following day, she saw another apparition, this time also with the Christ child. Three days after the first event, both she and 12-year-old Barbara Samulowska saw Mary, and Justyna asked: "What do you want, Holy Mary?" Mary answered in the local Polish dialect, "I want you to pray the Rosary daily." During the apparition the next day, Justyna asked, "Who are You?" and Mary replied, "I am the Blessed Virgin Mary of Immaculate Conception." In the coming days, Mary promised that fervent prayer would be able to end the persecutions of Catholic Poles that had occurred under Kulturkampf. The apparitions continued for three months. On September 8, about a week before the apparitions ended, Mary blessed a spring of water, from which pilgrims have subsequently reported healings. Our Lady of Gietrzwałd is the only approved Marian apparition in Poland.
Our Lady of Tears	1930	Campinas, Brazil	Amália de Jesus Flagelado	March 8, 1931; Bishop Francisco de Campos Barreto; Archdiocese of Campinas
On November 8, 1929, a friend of Sister Amalia came to her to ask for prayers for his seriously ill wife. The nun then went to the chapel of the Institute of the Missionary Sisters of Jesus Crucified to pray in this intention, when suddenly Jesus appeared to her and said that she should ask him for this grace through the tears of her mother Mary, teaching her a prayer and assuring her that nothing would be denied her if the request was made in the name of his mother's tears. He also stated that Maria would visit Amália soon. On March 8, 1930, she was praying in the same place when the Virgin appeared to her. Maria was dressed in a purple tunic, a dark blue mantle, a white veil that stretched from her head to her chest and in her hands she held a rosary of glittering pearls. Maria then asked Amália to propagate the rosary, calling it "Crown of Tears". She also stated that she would bestow graces on those who would pray it with devotion. On April 8 of the same year, Maria appeared again to Amália, indicating a medal that should be used by her devotees so that they could obtain her protection and miracles.
Our Lady of Beauraing Virgin of the Golden Heart	1932–1933	Beauraing, Belgium	Andree Degeimbre; Gilberte Degeimbre; Albert Voisin; Fernande Voisin; Gilberte Voisin	July 2, 1949; Bishop André-Marie Charue; Diocese of Namur
Between November 29, 1932, and January 3, 1933, five children, ages 9 to 15, reported seeing 33 apparitions of Mary in the garden of a boarding school run by the Sisters of the Christian Doctrine. During the apparitions, Mary appeared in a white robe with rays of blue and a crown of light. In the final apparitions, the Virgin Mary revealed a Heart of Gold, from which the title of the Virgin of the Golden Heart was given to her. Mary told the children she was the Immaculate Conception, the Mother of God and the Queen of Heaven. Mary asked for prayer, sacrifice and for the construction of a chapel as a place of pilgrimage, promising to convert sinners.
Our Lady of Banneux Virgin of the Poor	1933	Banneux, Belgium	Mariette Beco	August 22, 1949; Bishop Louis-Joseph Kerkhofs; Diocese of Liège
Between January 15, 1933, and March 2, 1933, an 11-year-old girl named Mariette Beco reported eight apparitions of Mary. The first apparition took place in the garden of her family’s house, followed by other apparitions near a nearby spring that Mary led Mariette to. Mary said to Mariette that "this spring is reserved for all nations... to relieve the sick" and that through this spring miracles of healing would be worked. Mary identified herself as "the Virgin of the Poor", the Mother of the Savior and the Mother of God. Mary asked for prayer, for the construction of a chapel and to believe in her.
Our Lady of Graces	1936–1937	Cimbres, Pesqueira, Brazil	Maria da Luz Teixeira de Carvalho; Maria da Conceição Silva	October 13, 2021; Bishop José Luiz Ferreira Salles; Diocese of Pesqueira
On August 6, 1936, young Maria da Luz, 13 years old, and Maria da Conceição, 16 years old, were walking near the town of Cimbres. The two girls, as well as all the residents of the place, lived in fear of encountering thieves cangaceiros along the way. The younger girl said that if they were found by the thieves, Our Lady would protect them. After saying that, the two girls saw a woman with a baby in her arms, surrounded by luminous rays. The girls then asked her her name and she replied "I am grace". At this, they recognized that the woman they saw was Mary and her child that she was carrying with her was Jesus. In the days that followed, Maria revealed to the girls that she had appeared to them to warn them of the danger of communism. She asked them to avoid the punishment of heaven over Brazil, to warn the people to do penance and to devote themselves to the heart of Jesus and her. To prove his presence, he made clear, crystalline water come out of a dry rock, stating that those who would drink from it would be cured of their illnesses. At the beginning of the phenomena, the German priest Joseph Kehrle was appointed by the bishop to accompany the apparitions and concluded that they were true apparitions of the Virgin Mary. The last apparition occurred in 1985 to Maria da Luz, who later became a nun and adopted the religious name Adélia. At that time she was suffering from terminal cancer and was cured after witnessing a new apparition. Maria da Conceição continued her lay life.
Our Lady of Akita	1973	Akita, Japan	Agnes Katsuko Sasagawa	April 22, 1984; Bishop John Shojiro Ito; Diocese of Niigata
Sister Agnes Katsuko Sasagawa reported seeing a statue of The Lady of All Nations illuminate and reported hearing messages, even though she was deaf. The same statue also miraculously wept, a phenomenon repeated on 101 occasions and broadcast on Japanese national television. The messages were apocalyptic in nature, warning of coming calamities if mankind is to not repent. One such prophesy stated, If men do not repent and better themselves, the Father will inflict a terrible punishment on all humanity. It will be a punishment greater than the deluge, such as one will never have seen before. Fire will fall from the sky and will wipe out a great part of humanity, ... the good as well as the bad, sparing neither priests nor faithful. The survivors will find themselves so desolate that they will envy the dead. The only arms which will remain for you will be the Rosary and the Sign left by My Son. Each day recite the prayer of the Rosary. With the Rosary pray for the Pope, bishops and the priests. The work of the devil will infiltrate even into the Church in such a way that one will see cardinals opposing cardinals, and bishops against other bishops.
Our Lady of Cuapa	1980	San Francisco de Cuapa, Nicaragua	Bernardo Martinez	1994; César Bosco Vivas Robelo; Diocese of León in Nicaragua
A sacristan named Bernardo Martinez reported seeing a supernatural light emanating from a statue of the Virgin Mary in the parish church on April 15, 1980. When walking through the fields shortly thereafter on May 8, he saw a vision of the Virgin Mary, who encouraged him to pray the Rosary daily and to promote peace, saying, "Make peace. Don't ask Our Lord for peace because, if you do not make it, there will be no peace." At this time, Nicaragua was going through a civil war, with the Sandinista government facing armed opposition from the Contras. Bernardo reported that Mary asked people to burn books that deny God and promote sin. Many locals understood this to mean Marxist books, and the consequent book-burnings resulted in backlash from supporters of the Communist government. In 2005, Silvio Sirias wrote a novel, Bernardo and the Virgin, based on the apparition events.
Our Lady of Kibeho Mother of the Word	1981–1983	Kibeho, Rwanda	Alphonsine Mumureke; Nathalie Mukamazimpaka; Marie Claire Mukangango	June 29, 2001; Bishop Augustin Misago; Diocese of Gikongoro
On November 28, 1981, in the African college of Kibeho, Rwanda, the Virgin Mary reportedly appeared to three teenage students, Alphonsine Mumureke, Nathalie Mukamazimpaka, and Marie Claire Mukangango. The apparition identified herself in the native Rwandan dialect as "Nyina wa Jambo" ("Mother of the Word") and warned of the coming 1994 Rwandan Genocide (in which Mukangango was killed). The Marian sanctuary at Kibeho was named "Shrine of Our Lady of Sorrows" in 1992, two years before the genocide. Only the apparitions to Mumureke, Mukamazimpaka, and Mukangango were approved; other apparitions reported by several other girls and one boy were not. An estimated 500,000 pilgrims visit the site every year.
Our Lady of the Rosary of San Nicolás	1983–1990	San Nicolás de los Arroyos, Argentina	Gladys Quiroga de Motta	May 22, 2016; Bishop Héctor Cardelli; Diocese of San Nicolás de los Arroyos
In 1983, amid reports of rosaries mysteriously glowing in homes throughout San Nicolás, a mother and grandmother named Gladys Quiroga de Motta, upon witnessing the phenomenon, began to pray the Rosary. On 25 September 1983, the Virgin Mary appeared to Gladys wearing a blue gown and veil, holding the baby Jesus and a rosary in her hand. Later, Mary asked Gladys to go look for a statue that had been blessed by Pope Leo XIII but was hidden away, forgotten, in a church. She found the Marian statue, which bore a resemblance to Mary's appearance in the apparition, in the belfry of the diocesan cathedral. Among other requests, Mary asked for a medal to be cast with the title Our Lady of the Rosary of San Nicolás and a new Sanctuary to be built. Gladys continued to receive apparitions from Mary and Jesus, some of them apocalyptic in nature, warning of mankind's impending self-destruction and the loss of many souls. Between 1983 and 1990, approximately 1,800 messages were approved following the positive judgment of the apparitions by the local bishop on May 22, 2016.
Mary, Virgin and Mother, Reconciler of All Peoples and Nations	1984	Finca Betania, Venezuela	Maria Esperanza de Bianchini and 150 other people	1987; Bishop Pío Bello Ricardo; Diocese of Los Teques
Maria Esperanza de Bianchini had several Marian apparitions among her many mystical experiences. In one event on March 25, 1984, 150 other people also said they saw the Blessed Mother along with Maria Esperanza. The apparition is known under the title "Mary, Virgin and Mother, Reconciler of All Peoples and Nations".

=== Positive judgment of related effects ===
In some cases, the apparitions do not receive a positive judgment in themselves (because an investigation is still in progress, or because an investigation is judged not to be feasible or necessary, etc.), but elements surrounding the apparition receive approval.

==== Approved contemporaneous miracle ====
In cases in which a seer reports that Mary appeared to him or her and worked a miracle, ecclesial authorities will occasionally evaluate and certify the miracle – thereby implying belief in the person's account of how it happened – but without directly commenting on the apparition itself.

Associated Marian titles	Years	Location	Seers	Approval of associated miracle
Madonna of the Miracle Our Lady of Zion	1842	Sant'Andrea delle Fratte in Rome, Italy (then the Papal States)	Marie-Alphonse Ratisbonne	June 3, 1842; Cardinal Costantino Patrizi; Vicariate of Rome
A Jewish man named Marie-Alphonse Ratisbonne reported seeing an apparition of the Blessed Virgin Mary in a side chapel in the church of Sant'Andrea delle Fratte in Rome. The experience led him to convert to Catholicism. His complete transformation from vehement opposition to the Catholic faith was determined a miracle. St. Maximilian Kolbe, a devotee of the apparition, celebrated his first Mass as a priest in that same chapel.

==== Approved public veneration ====
There are cases in which the Holy See or a local ordinary chooses not to open or definitively conclude an investigation into the supernatural character of the apparitions themselves, but approves of the public religious activity inspired by the apparition. Such approval can come by way of an explicit decree or by implicit means such as the authorization of liturgical veneration.

Associated Marian titles	Years	Location	Seers	Approval of public veneration
Our Lady of the Pillar	40	Zaragoza, Spain (then Hispania Tarraconensis, Roman Empire)	James the Apostle	Liturgical veneration approved 1730; Pope Clement XII
Catholic tradition holds that, in the early days of Christianity, the Apostles of Jesus spread the Gospel throughout the known world, with James the Greater evangelizing in Roman Hispania (modern-day Spain). James confronted great difficulties in his missionary efforts and faced severe discouragement. In AD 40, while he was praying by the banks of the Ebro at Caesaraugusta (Zaragoza), Mary bilocated from Jerusalem, where she was living at the time, and appeared to James accompanied by thousands of angels, to console and encourage him. Our Lady of the Pillar is considered the first Marian apparition, although it is unique in this regard because it is the only one to have occurred while Mary may have still been alive on Earth.
Our Lady of Covadonga	732	Covadonga, Spain (then the Kingdom of Asturias)	Pelagius of Asturias	Basilica of site consecrated 1901
Spanish tradition holds that prior to the Battle of Covadonga, the soldiers of Pelagius of Asturias prayed for intercession of the Blessed Virgin Mary, and said tradition states she had appeared to them. Also, a statue of the virgin was hidden in one of the caves, was believed to have miraculously aided the Christian victory. This battle was seen as the opening of the Reconquista
Our Lady of Walsingham	1061	Walsingham, England	Richeldis de Faverches	Shrine approved 1897; Pope Leo XIII
In 1061, a devout Saxon noblewoman named Richeldis de Faverches reported that Mary showed her, through a vision, the house of Mary in Nazareth in which the Annunciation took place, and asked her to build a replica of it. Once constructed, the shrine passed into the care of the Canons Regular of St. Augustine sometime between 1146 and 1174. Late in 1538, King Henry VIII's soldiers sacked the priory at Walsingham, killed two monks and destroyed the shrine. In 1896, the 14th-century Slipper Chapel was restored. In 1897, Pope Leo XIII established the Holy House in the Lady Chapel of Our Lady of the Annunciation Church, King's Lynn as a Roman Catholic shrine. There is the also the Anglican Shrine of Our Lady of Walsingham in the care of the Church of England.
Our Lady of the Rosary	1206-1214	Prouille, France	Saint Dominic	Shrine approved 1569
According to Dominican tradition, anytime between 1206 to 1214, Dominic de Guzmán was at the Monastery of Our Lady of Prouille, in France, attempting to convert the Albigensians back to the Catholic faith. The young priest had little success until one day he received a vision of the Blessed Virgin, who gave him the Rosary as a tool against heretics. The story of Dominic's vision was recorded by Alanus de Rupe, a 15th-century Dominican friar who is credited with promoting the Rosary among the faithful in Europe. This traditional origin for the Rosary was generally accepted, including by many popes, until the 17th century, when the Bollandists concluded that the account originated with the account recorded by Alanus, two hundred years after Dominic's death. However, several popes after the 17th century, like Pope Leo XIII and Pope Pius XI, continued to attribute its origin to Dominic in official documents such as encyclicals.
Our Lady of Mount Carmel	1251	Aylesford, England	Simon Stock	Repeated endorsement of the associated devotional scapular by the Holy See
According to Carmelite tradition, Mary appeared to Simon Stock, who was Prior General of the Order in the mid-13th century. The earliest reference to the tradition of his Marian apparition, dating from the late 14th century, states that "St. Simon was an Englishman, a man of great holiness and devotion, who always in his prayers asked the Virgin to favor his Order with some singular privilege. The Virgin appeared to him holding the Brown Scapular in her hand saying, 'This is for you and yours a privilege; the one who dies in it will be saved.'" A scapular, properly speaking, is a double-sided apron-like garment that forms part of the Carmelite religious habit. In its original context, the Blessed Virgin Mary's promise was an assurance that Carmelites who persevered in their vocation would be saved. Beginning in the latter half of the 16th century, a small devotional scapular became very popular as a sacramental.
Our Lady of Caravaggio	26 May 1432	Caravaggio, Lombardy, Italy (then the Duchy of Milan)	Giovannette Vaccli	Shrine elevated to Minor Basilica; 7 May 1906; Pope Pius X
The apparition was reported by Giovannette, daughter of Pietro Vaccli and wife of Francesco Varoli. She said that on 26 May 1432, Mary appeared in a field in Caravaggio, in Northern Italy, in the region of Milan; and said that her Son was angry, that for him people should fast on Fridays and for her they should celebrate Saturdays after vespers. The Virgin Mary announced peace to Giovannette in her family, among the neighboring warring states and reconciliation between the Church in the East and West, through the Council of Florence (1436—1445). As proof of her Marian apparition, the Virgin left the imprint of her feet on the stone where she stood. A spring of water sprung forth from under the stone, purported to be miraculous.
Our Lady of the Watch	1490	Monte Figogna, Italy (then the Republic of Genoa)	Benedetto Pareto	Shrine elevated to Minor Basilica; March 11, 1915; Pope Benedict XV
An Italian peasant named Benedetto Pareto reported seeing an apparition of Mary on top of Monte Figogna (near Genoa, Italy) on August 29, 1490. Pareto said that the Virgin Mary appeared to him and asked him to build a church atop the mountain. Pareto at first refused, saying that he was just a poor man, but he eventually built a small wooden structure, which in time gathered many pilgrims and is now contained within the Shrine of Our Lady of the Watch. (The apparition is so-named because Monte Figogna used to be a watch-point for the strategic observation of armies and ships.)
Our Lady of Good Health Our Lady of Velankanni	1570 and 1587	Velankanni, Tamil Nadu, India (then the Portuguese State of India)	Two children, on separate occasions	Shrine elevated to Minor Basilica; 1962; Pope John XXIII
The Basilica of Our Lady of Good Health in Velankanni commemorates two distinct but similar apparitions: the first in 1570 and the second in 1587. In each case, a local child reported a woman appearing and asking for milk to feed her infant. Each appearance was followed by a miracle, leading the locals to believe that both times it was Mary with the child Jesus who had appeared.
Our Lady of Šiluva	1608	Šiluva, Lithuania (then part of the Polish–Lithuanian Commonwealth)	Group of non-Catholics	Public veneration approved 1755; Pope Pius VI
With the advent of the Reformation in 16th century Lithuania, many of the inhabitants in the region around Šiluva converted to Calvinism. This caused the Catholic church building in Šiluva to eventually be ransacked and closed around 1569. The last parish priest, John Holubka, buried the remaining church valuables and legal documents and deeds in an iron box near the vandalized church. Subsequent attempts by the Catholics to regain the property through legal proceedings against the Calvinists were hindered by the fact that the exact location of the documents pertaining to the church were unknown. In 1608, Mary appeared to miraculously intervene in the matter by appearing at the church and holding the baby Jesus in her arms and weeping bitterly. The apparition was on the site of the buried valuables and documents, leading to the recovery of the deed, the reclaiming of the church land by the Catholics, and the conversion of many Calvinists. Devotion to Our Lady of Šiluva was temporarily suppressed during the period that Lithuania was part of the Soviet Union. She remains a significant symbol of Lithuanian cultural heritage.
Our Lady of Manaoag	1610	Manaoag, Philippines (then the Captaincy General of the Philippines)	Juan de la Cruz	Coronation Approved; 21 Apr 1926; Pope Pius XI
Documents dating back to 1610 attest that a middle-aged farmer walking home heard a mysterious female voice. He looked around and saw on a cloud-veiled treetop an apparition of the Virgin Mary, holding a rosary in her right hand and the Child Jesus in her left arm, all amid a heavenly glow. Mary told the farmer where she wanted her church to be built, and a chapel was built on the hilltop site of the apparition, forming the nucleus of the present town.
Our Lady of Caysasay	1611-1619, 1639	Taal, Batangas, Philippines (then the Captaincy General of the Philippines)	Catalina Talain; Juana Tangui	Coronation Approved; 21 November 1954; Pope Pius XII
The apparition of the Lady of Caysasay to Juana Tangui was a more documented report. Fr. Casimiro Díaz, a representative of the Mexican vicar, in his 18th century Conquista de las Islas Filipinas (Part II), gave a detailed account: In a sitio called Bingsacan, near the village of Caysasay, around 1611, the natives saw several times, mainly at night, near a river where they go to fetch water, a very great light coming from a small opening in a large rock. From a distance it shone more brightly than four giant wax candles. As they got nearer, they could hear sweet and harmonious music made by very pleasant instruments, which entranced them, not so much because they did not expect to hear music but because of the divine melody that they heard. As they approached closer, some saw a beautiful hand and arm jutting out of the opening in the rock. It held a lighted torch, which moved up and down, though it remained in its place in the opening. They watched this light for a long time, listening to music. Others saw only the great ray of light, while still others saw that above the rock, there was a very great light, and another group saw a great flame, which seemed to devour that sitio. After this unusual phenomenon, which had never before been seen or heard of in that place, some natives decided to see what it really was. They saw a vision of the Virgin Mary, just a little taller than the size of an open hand from the tip of the thumb to the tip of the middle finger, dressed in white, with a crown on her head, and in her arms was the Infant Jesus, who also wore a crown. Miraculous healing powers were attributed to waters from the spring. More than 30 people declared they saw visions of the Lady at Caysasay, and soon pilgrims flocked to the area. The news reached a native named Juana Tangui, from the town of Bauan who was the servant of Don Juan Mangabot, one of the town's prominent natives. She was a simple, devout woman who had been suffering for a long time from a burning sensation in the eyes, leaving her almost blind. Her eyes could not be healed by the many remedies that had been applied to it, so she was resolved to go to the rock where people said the Blessed Virgin appeared. She went accompanied by one of her master's daughters to that place where the ray of light was first seen. She had also heard that everyone who bathed in the small stream was cured of any sickness of which they may have been suffering. For this reason, she bathed in the stream in the company of nine or ten other people doing the same. During the entire time of her bath, she noticed an unusual shadow by her side, though there was neither sun nor moon that could cause it, since it was already evening and it was very dark. After some time she felt that someone was holding her and turning her body. When she turned to the place toward which she was being turned, she saw a great light, like that coming from an enormous lit candle, which caused her great wonder. But she did not dare to move forward in order to examine what she had seen. She went to a nearby field where she recounted what had happened to some native women. But they told her to return and to examine closely what it was. Since she said that she could not see very well, on account of her eye disease, they offered a young servant to accompany her to that place. The recent account of Fr. Cruz is similar but says it was a young servant boy who was sent back with Juana. Upon arriving at the spot, she made the girl kneel down. Juana walked further and saw a very bright light and the image of our Lady, almost two palm measurements in height, dressed in white, with a crown on her head and a cross on her forehead. The image seemed to be alive, as it was moving and blinking. When the native woman moved closer to her, the image spoke to her, thanking her for remembering her and coming back to see her. Juana declared that the apparition told her, "You have been kindhearted to me, but unless you wear the belt of the Cofradía de San Agustin (Confraternity of Saint Augustine), do not come back to see me, until you are a member of the Confraternity, and you wear it." The native woman returned to the town, and did not tell anyone about what had happened until she had spoken with Fr. Juan Bautista Montoya, prior of the Taal convento. She reverently asked him for the belt of or cincture the Confraternity, and after spending eight days in confession, the prior vested her in the belt. She returned to the place where the Blessed Virgin had spoken to her. In addition to herself, she brought with her eight or nine people, among them the wife of her master, Doña Juliana Dimoyaguín and other prominent residents, whose declarations appear in the accounts published about the event. They returned to the same place where the girl who had accompanied her the first time had knelt down. She moved forward to the same spot where she had been a few days before, and she saw once more, clearly and distinctly, the Blessed Virgin. After making a deep bow, Juana knelt in her presence. The Virgin told her that she was much more pleased with her than before, because she was wearing the belt of the Confraternity. The devout native asked the Virgin directly what sign she should carry so that people would believe that she had spoken to and been in the company of the Virgin. The Virgin responded by asking for Juana's rosary and belt, telling her that it was a sufficient sign for her to touch them. Juana gave the Queen of Heaven her belt and her rosary, together with the rosaries that her companions had taken care to bring with them. The Virgin accepted them and then returned them to the said Juana Tangui. The women who received the rosaries declared that the fragrance that emanated from them elevated their souls. Moreover, Juana's eyes were healed, her eyesight restored.
Our Lady of Querrien	1652	Querrien, France	Jeanne Courtel	Public veneration approved.
The Marian apparitions of Querrien refer to the Marian apparitions that happened to Jeanne Courtel (1641-1703), an 11-year-old girl. They occurred from August 15, 1652 until the beginning of September of the same year, in the commune of La Prénessaye, Côtes-d'Armor (France). Fifteen apparitions were reported. During the first "Marian apparition," a girl deaf and from birth instantly regained her speech and hearing, to the surprise of all the villagers. A few days later the girl asked villagers to dig near the local spring. Legend said it was once the site of a statue of the Virgin Mary. The wooden statuette was exhumed at the indicated spot, confirming the girl's claims to the villagers. The local bishop, Denis de La Barde, launched an investigation and went to the site to verify the child's statements. Satisfied with his findings, he had a chapel built to organize the devotion of the faithful. The apparition was informally validated at the time by the construction of a chapel where the statue was found and the organization of worship. The chapel quickly became a major local pilgrimage site, still frequented today by more than 70,000 pilgrims a year. It is particularly busy during pardons.
Our Lady of Solitude of Porta Vaga	1667	Cavite City, Philippines (then the Captaincy General of the Philippines)	Soldier for the Guardia Civil	Cannonical coronation approved by Pope Francis
Tradition says a miraculous lady appeared before a soldier of the Guardia Civil. Identifying herself as Mary, mother of Jesus, she sought entrance through Porta Vaga to Cavite Puerto. The next day, fishermen and workers at the Cavite Royal Arsenal found the image of the Virgen de la Soledad floating on the waters of Cañacao Bay.
Our Lady of Las Lajas	1754	Guáitara Canyon, Colombia (then the Viceroyalty of New Granada)	Maria Mueses de Quiñones, and her daughter Rosa	Public veneration approved Pope Paul VI on 26 April 1965
According to popular belief, the Virgin Mary appeared to a woman and her deaf-mute daughter in 1754 at the same place where the church now stands. The woman, Maria Mueses de Quiñones, and her daughter Rosa were passing by the Guaitara river when they sought refuge from a storm. At that moment, Rosa shouted "Mum, the Virgin is calling me!" and pointed to an apparition of the Virgin Mary. The woman kept quiet about the apparition until something even less expected happened: after Rosa died, Mueses, determined to pray for her daughter's soul, returned to the place where her daughter and she had seen the Virgin Mary; the Virgin then miraculously revived Rosa, and mother and daughter could no longer keep the miracle a secret. The first shrine in the honor of Jesus Christ's mother was built a few years after the alleged appearance, according to the journal of a friar who travelled through the region between 1756 and 1764. Half a century later, in 1802, a bigger shrine was built and worshipers erected the first version of the bridge that now allows access to the church.
Our Lady of La Vang	1798	Hải Lăng, Vietnam (under the Tây Sơn dynasty)	Vietnamese villagers	Shrine elevated to Minor Basilica; August 22, 1961; Pope John XXIII
A group of Vietnamese had been fleeing anti-Catholic persecution by hiding in the jungle, and many had become very ill. The community would gather every night at the foot of a tree to pray the Rosary. The group reported that, one night, Mary appeared to them all, wearing the traditional áo dài Vietnamese dress, holding the child Jesus, and accompanied by angels. She comforted them and instructed them on how to use herbs in the rainforest to cure their illnesses. Although ecclesial authorities never opened a formal investigation, Our Lady of La Vang and her importance for Vietnamese Catholics has been endorsed numerous times by various bishops and popes. She is also venerated by some Vietnamese Protestants and Buddhists.
Our Lady of Ilača	1865	Ilača, Croatia (Austrian Empire)	Petar Lazin	Approved for veneration by Josip Juraj Strossmayer; 1866
In 1865, a shepherd from Ilača, Petar Lazin, claimed seeing water on the middle of the field road although no rain had fallen, and that once he made a hole, water started flowing and continued thereafter. On the same night, another villager, Đuka Ambrušević saw the Virgin Mary with a child. In his dream, she told him that it was her spring, and that he must build a wall around it so that livestock could not drink from it. When he woke up, he saw the image from his dream next to his bed. In 1866, a small chapel was built next to the spring, and in 1870 construction of a church began. Ilača became the target of pilgrimage for Roman Catholic Croats, Germans, Hungarians as well as for Eastern-rite Catholic Pannonian Rusyns.
Our Lady of Pellevoisin	1876	Pellevoisin, France	Estelle Faguette	Associated confraternity and scapular approved by Pope Leo XIII
In 1876, a French domestic servant, Estelle Faguette, reported seeing a series of 15 apparitions of the Virgin Mary in the bedroom where she was staying near Pellevoisin, France. When her visions allegedly began, Faguette was terminally ill with tuberculosis and near death. However, in the second apparition, she heard Mary tell her that she would be healed; she recovered and lived until 1929. (In 1983, following a medical and theological inquiry, Archbishop Paul Vignancour of Bourges recognized her recovery as having a miraculous nature.) Faguette also said that during a later apparition, she saw Mary show her the design for the Scapular of the Sacred Heart and told her to ask her bishop to encourage its devotional use. The Shrine of Our Lady of Pellevoisin was later constructed near the site of the apparitions. Although Pope Leo XIII approved the scapular and a confraternity to spread its use, the apparition itself was never approved.
Our Lady of China Our Lady of Donglü Queen of All Chinese People in Heaven	1900	Donglü, China (under the Qing dynasty)	Small Christian community, ~700	Commemorative image approved 1928; Pope Pius XI
In April 1900, during the Boxer Rebellion, a large number of soldiers attacked the small village of Donglü. Our Lady reportedly appeared dressed in white, and a fiery horseman (believed to be Saint Michael) chased the soldiers away. A small shrine was built to venerate her in the village, but was destroyed twice. The village pastor, Fr. Wu, commissioned a painting of Mary and Jesus in Chinese royal garb. It has been used as a popular symbol of Chinese Christians. Despite the rampant persecution, there are many shrines consecrated to Our Lady of Donglü.
Our Lady of Prayer	1947	L'Île-Bouchard, France	Jacqueline Aubry; Jeannette Aubry; Nicole Robin; Laura Croizon	Public veneration approved December 8, 2001; Archbishop André Vingt-Trois; Archdiocese of Tours
On December 8, 1947, 12-year-old Jacqueline Aubry, her sister Jeannette, and cousin Nicole Robin were among students in L'Île-Bouchard in France whose teacher asked them to spend the lunch hour "praying for France". Although their families were nonpracticing and anticlerical, the girls agreed to their teacher's request. This was a period of intense civil strife in France and many believed civil war was imminent. The girls were saying the Rosary in the church of St. Gilles when they experienced the first of several Marian apparitions. They said they saw a beautiful young lady with long curly blonde hair, accompanied by an angel (whom they later identified as Gabriel) who knelt at her side. Running out into the street, the girls asked two friends to come and see the vision: one, Laura Croizon, was able to see it and became the fourth visionary. The day after the first apparition, labor unions agreed to go into negotiations with the government, and believers credited the apparition and the children's prayers. The visitations went on for six days.
Rosa Mystica Mystical Rose – Mother of the Church	1945–1966	Montichiari and Fontanelle, Italy	Pierina Gilli	Public veneration approved December 7, 2019; Bishop Pierantonio Tremolada; Diocese of Brescia
From 1947 to 1966, Pierina Gilli, an Italian nurse, witnessed apparitions of the Blessed Virgin Mary in Montichiari and Fontanelle, Italy, firstly appearing with three swords piercing her Immaculate Heart and after in a splendidly different manner: in a white dress and with a white mantle around her head that reached to the floor; the three swords were on the floor, and on the chest of the Virgin Mary were three roses: one white, one red, and one gold. Initially Our Lady said just three words to her: "Prayer, Sacrifice, Penance". Pierina had offered all her sufferings for the sanctification of Roman Catholic consecrated souls (namely, for the priests and for members of male and female religious institutes, as listed in the Holy See's Pontifical Yearbook, in Italian, Annuario Pontificio). On December 7, 2019, Bishop Pierantonio Tremolada instituted an official Sanctuary of Our Lady Rosa Mystica at the apparition site in Fontanelle.
Our Lady of Medjugorje The Gospa Queen of Peace	1981–present	Medjugorje, Bosnia and Herzegovina	Jakov Čolo; Ivan Dragičević; Mirjana Dragičević; Marija Pavlović; Ivanka Ivanković; Vicka Ivanković	Public veneration approved September 19, 2024; Cardinal Víctor Manuel Fernández; Prefect of the Dicastery for the Doctrine of the Faith
The reported apparitions of the Virgin Mary to six children in Medjugorje, beginning in 1981, have received significant attention due to the numerous miracles that large crowds of pilgrims report experiencing on an almost-daily basis, including dramatic conversions, visions, rosaries turning to a gold color, astronomical phenomena like the Miracle of the Sun, etc. The alleged apparitions are also notable for their duration, having been occurring continuously for almost 40 years. The apparition messages contain five main requests: first, to pray the entire Rosary daily; second, to fast on Wednesdays and Fridays; third, to attend Mass as often as possible; fourth, to go to Confession at least monthly; and fifth, to read the Bible daily. The alleged apparitions were vigorously opposed by the local bishop, Pavao Žanić of Mostar-Duvno. Various commissions appointed to investigate the apparitions did not come to a definitive conclusion and left the events open to further study. On March 17, 2010, the Holy See announced it was taking over formal investigation of the alleged apparitions at Medjugorje, with Cardinal Camillo Ruini heading an investigatory commission that ran from 2010 to 2014. Pope Francis authorized official church pilgrimages in 2019, but without making any declaration on the alleged apparitions themselves.

=== No judgment ===
Apparitions in this category have not received judgment on the apparitions themselves or on associated elements, either because an investigation was never opened, or because an investigation is still in progress.

Associated Marian titles	Years	Location	Seers
Our Lady of the Universe Our Lady of the Concourse	1945	The Bronx, New York, United States of America	Joseph Vitolo
On October 29, 1945, at 7 pm, 9-year-old Joseph Vitolo was one of a group of children playing outside his home near The Bronx's Grand Concourse. Joseph saw a young woman, whom he identified as the Virgin, invisible to the other children. He heard her ask him to come back at the same hour for sixteen nights and to pray for world peace. Joseph did so, accompanied by his mother and numerous onlookers. Within a few days, the visitations were receiving worldwide attention and up to 30,000 people attended the nightly vigil. Among those who expressed interest in the events were Fulton Sheen and Francis Spellman, while Frank Sinatra, Lou Costello were rumored to have done so. Revered by the pilgrims, Joseph was frequently asked to cure the sick and injured and would respond by praying with them. The place where Joseph allegedly saw the visions was bought by a devotee who created a shrine there, but there was never any official investigation or attempt to confirm the reported visitations as legitimate. Joseph struggled throughout his life, taking various menial jobs to support him and his family. He continued to visit the shrine at 7 p.m. each evening until age and poor health prevented him from climbing the hill. The alleged apparitions were never officially approved, but the nearby St. Philip Neri's Church holds special Masses at the shrine on the anniversaries of the first and last reported visitations.
Our Lady of Soufanieh	1982–1983	Soufanieh, Damascus, Syria	Mary Kourbet "Myrna" (Al-Akhras) Nazzour
Myrna Nazzour, a Melkite Catholic woman married to an Orthodox husband, has reported experiencing various mystical phenomena over the years beginning in 1982, including olive oil oozing both from an icon and from her own hands, stigmata wounds on her body, and apparitions of Mary. Mary appeared five times between 1982 and 1983, asking for prayers for Christian unity (especially between Catholics and Orthodox), particularly stressing the importance of a unified date for Easter. Myrna reported continuing to receive locutions even after the alleged apparitions ceased.

=== Neutral judgment ===
Apparitions in this category have been evaluated, but received neither approval nor rejection. This is known as a "non constat de supernaturalitate" judgment, or "non constat" for short. The apparitions listed here also lack approval for any related public cultus, such as public veneration or pilgrimages.

Associated Marian titles	Years	Location	Seers	Neutral judgment
Our Lady of Mount Carmel of Garabandal	1961–1965	San Sebastián de Garabandal in Cantabria, Spain	Jacinta González; Mari Cruz González; Maria "Conchita" Concepción González; Mari Loli Mazón	November 7, 2001; Bishop José Vilaplana Blasco; Diocese of Santander
Four girls reported seeing apparitions of Saint Michael the Archangel and the Blessed Virgin Mary. The girls heard Mary predict a forthcoming "Warning" from God, apparent to the whole world, that will precede a "Great Miracle". If these do not result in the conversion of the world, a great Chastisement will follow.
Our Lady of America Our Lady of the Divine Indwelling	1956–1959	Rome City, Indiana, United States of America	Sister Mildred Mary Neuzil	May 7, 2020; Bishop Kevin C. Rhoades; Diocese of Fort Wayne–South Bend
Sister Mildred Mary Ephrem Neuzil of the Sisters of the Most Precious Blood reported seeing multiple apparitions of Mary, Joseph, and angels. In the alleged apparition messages, Mary identified herself as patroness of the United States under the title Our Lady of America, and pleaded for the United States to return to the virtue of purity. She also identified herself as Our Lady of the Divine Indwelling, a title which describes Mary as exemplar of one who possesses sanctifying grace. Saint Joseph reportedly requested a First Wednesday devotion to the Pure Heart of Joseph, to complement the existing First Friday and First Saturday devotions. Archbishop Paul Leibold of the Archdiocese of Cincinnati authorized various aspects of public devotion, but without passing judgment on the supernatural character of the alleged apparitions themselves. The alleged apparitions were also endorsed by Cardinal Raymond Burke. However, in 2020, Bishop Kevin C. Rhoades of Fort Wayne–South Bend concluded an official investigation into the alleged apparitions with a "non constat de supernaturalitate" judgment. He, together with a group of other bishops, determined that they could not approve public devotion or cult, but private devotion could continue without harm to the faith.

=== Negative judgment ===
Some apparitions, despite being officially rejected, are notable for continuing to have a substantial following. In rare cases, rejected apparitions are approved at a later date once new evidence becomes available.

Associated Marian titles	Years	Location	Seers	Rejection
Mary, Mediatrix of All Grace	1948	Lipa, Batangas, Philippines	Teresita Castillo	1951; Pope Pius XII
A postulant at a Carmelite Monastery reported seeing multiple apparitions of Mary during 1948. In 1951, the alleged apparitions were rejected by a panel of bishops, a decision confirmed by the Congregation of the Doctrine of the Faith under Pope Pius XII. Despite the rejection, the apparition continued to receive high-profile support, including from two Presidents of the Philippines (Corazon Aquino and Gloria Macapagal Arroyo). In 2015, the local bishop declared the apparitions to be approved, in what is the only known case of a local bishop attempting to ignore a Vatican decision on the authenticity of an apparition. The Vatican overruled the bishop and reasserted its previous decision later that same year. The apparition is also notable for likely being the only case in which the supernatural nature of the apparitions is denied, but the veneration surrounding the apparition is allowed to continue.
Queen of Roses Mother of Divine Wisdom	1949–1952	Heroldsbach, Bavaria, West Germany	Maria Heilmann; Gretel Gügel; Kuni Schleicher; Erika Müller; Antonie Saam; Irma Mehl; Rosa Bradl; Hildegarde Lang	1951; Pope Pius XII
The largest of a number of Marian apparitions in post-war Germany, the apparition in Heroldsbach began on 9 October 1949 when four children claimed to see a vision of Mary. Apparitions continued for 3 years, including several incidents of solar phenomena similar to the Miracle of the Sun. The Heroldsbach apparition developed an unusually devoted following, attracting 1.5 million pilgrims over the 3 years of its appearance. The local priest, the seers and forty local believers who had formed a lay commission dedicated to the apparition were all excommunicated by the Catholic Church – these excommunications were lifted by 1997. In 1998, the Archbishop of Bamberg Karl Braun regularized the position of the church at Heroldsbach as a "prayer site" to Mary under the name Mutter der göttlichen Weisheit (Mother of Divine Wisdom).
Our Lady of All Nations The Mother of All Nations Coredemptrix, Mediatrix, and Advocate	1945–1959	Amsterdam, Netherlands	Ida Peerdeman	2024; Pope Francis
A Dutch secretary named Ida Peerdeman claimed to have received Marian apparitions over the course of 14 years. Peerdeman's apparition messages predict a future Marian dogma that will express Mary's universal motherhood using the three titles of Coredemptrix, Mediatrix, and Advocate. In light of ongoing interest and persistent doubts about the apparitions, the CDF, reorganised by Pope Francis in 2022 as the Dicastery for the Doctrine of the Faith, issued a press release on July 11, 2024 reaffirming the 1974 decision. This clarification, communicated by Cardinal Víctor Manuel Fernández, the current Prefect, serves to ensure the faithful and their pastors are well-informed about the Church’s official stance.

== Coptic Orthodox Church ==
Associated Marian titles	Years	Location	Seers	Approval
Our Lady of Zeitoun	1968	Zeitoun, Egypt	Thousands, including Egyptian President Gamal Abdel Nasser	May 4, 1968; Cyril VI; Patriarchate of Alexandria
According to witnesses, Mary appeared in different forms over the Coptic Orthodox Church of Saint Mary in the Zeitoun district of Cairo, Egypt, for a period of 2–3 years, beginning on April 2, 1968, some ten months after the Six-Day War. It was a mass apparition, reportedly witnessed by many thousands of people, including Egyptian President Gamal Abdel Nasser, and captured by newspaper photographers and Egyptian television. The apparitions each lasted from a few minutes up to several hours and were sometimes accompanied by dove-shaped luminous bodies. There have been conversions to Christianity and claims of miraculous cures associated with the apparitions. A month into the events, the apparitions up to that point were approved by Pope Cyril VI of Alexandria.
Our Lady of Assiut	2000–2001	Asyut, Egypt	Thousands	October 13, 2001; Acknowledged as "apparitions of Virgin Mary" by Coptic priests in Assiut
The apparitions of Our Lady of Assiut were also mass apparitions in Assiut, Egypt, during 2000 and 2001 and many thousands of witnesses produced photographs of them, which were reprinted in several newspapers. The reports state that during Mass, pictures hung on the wall inside the altar, which show St Mary with a dove above her started to illuminate first, then the light from the dove in the pictures started to flow down. The lights thereafter appeared above the church as well and were seen by thousands of people. The Coptic church approved of the apparitions.
Our Lady of Warraq	2009	Warraq al-Hadar, Giza, Egypt	Approximately 3,000 people	December 2009; Bishop Anba Theodosius; Giza
Early on December 11, 2009, various phenomena began appearing above a church in Warraq al-Hadar. Shortly thereafter, the bishop authenticated the apparitions with a statement describing the events: The Bishopric of Giza announces that the Holy Virgin has appeared in a transfiguration at the Church named after her in Warraq al-Hadar, Giza, in the early hours of Friday 11 December 2009 at 1:00 am. The Holy Virgin appeared in her full height in luminous robes, above the middle dome of the church, in pure white dress and a royal blue belt. She had a crown on her head, above which appeared the cross on top of the dome. The crosses on top of the church's domes and towers glowed brightly with light. The Holy Virgin moved between the domes and on to the top of the church gate between its two twin towers. The local residents all saw her. The apparition lasted from 1:00 am till 4:00 am on Friday, and was registered by cameras and cell phones. Some 3,000 people from the neighbourhood, surrounding areas, and passers-by gathered in the street in front of the church to see the apparition. Since Friday, the huge crowds gathered in the vicinity of the church have been seeing luminous white pigeons soaring above the church during various times of the night, as well as a star which emerges suddenly in the heaven, travels some 200 metres across, then disappears. The huge crowds gathered around the church do not cease singing hymns and praises for the Holy Virgin.

== See also ==
- Holy Guardian Angel
