= Querrien Marian apparitions =

1652 apparitions to Jeanne Courtel

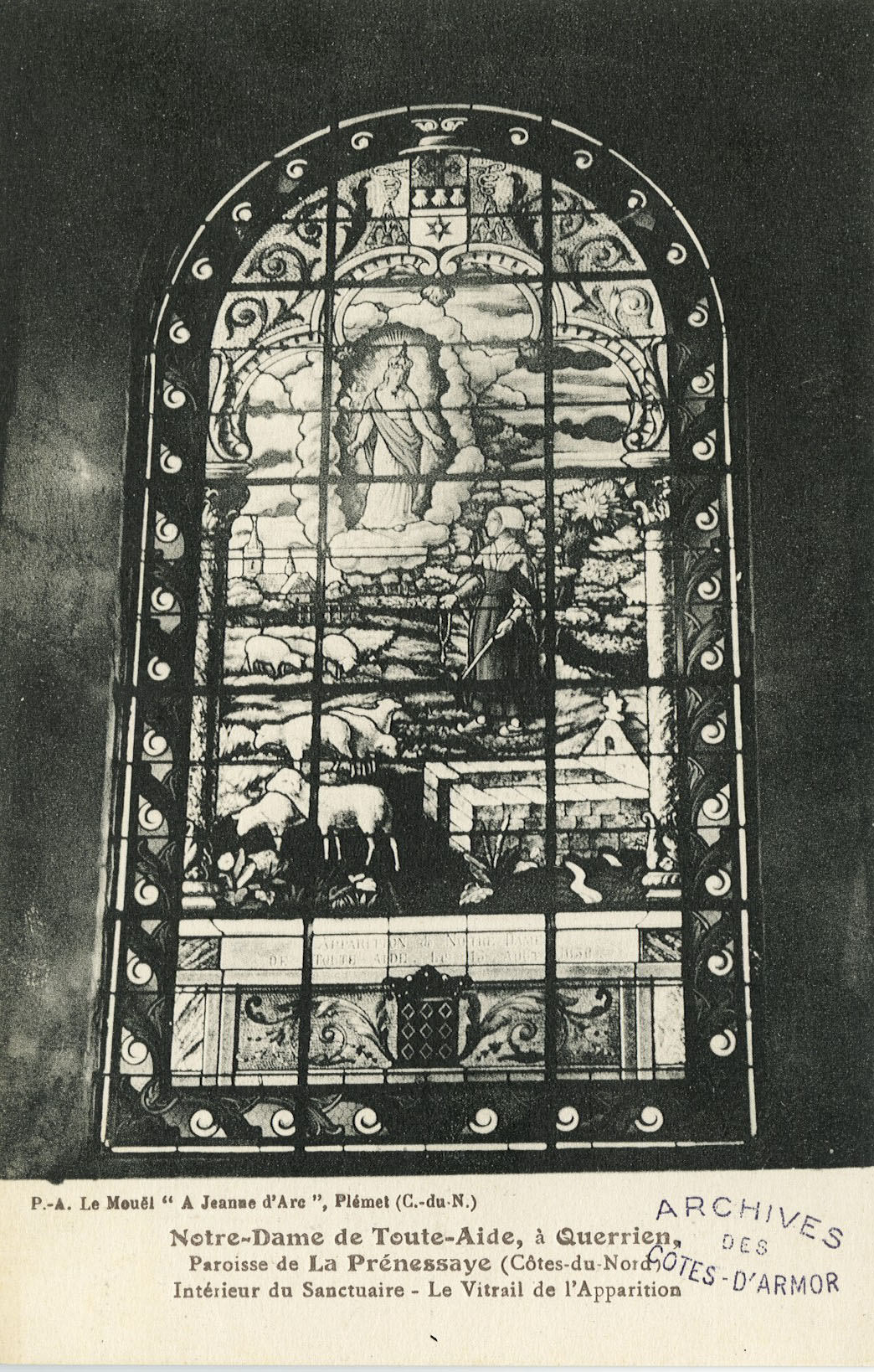
- Representation of the apparition on a stained-glass window in the chapel, on a postcard from around 1920.
- Location: La Prénessaye, Côtes-d'Armor France
- Date: 15 September 1652
- Witness: Jeanne Courtel (1641-1703)
- Type: Marian apparition
- Approval: Cult encouraged by Denis de La Barde from 1562. Chapel of Our Lady of All Help of Querrien erected on the site. No official recognition of the apparition.
- Shrine: The Fontenelles Field, La Prénessaye, Côtes-d'Armor France
- Feast day: 11th September

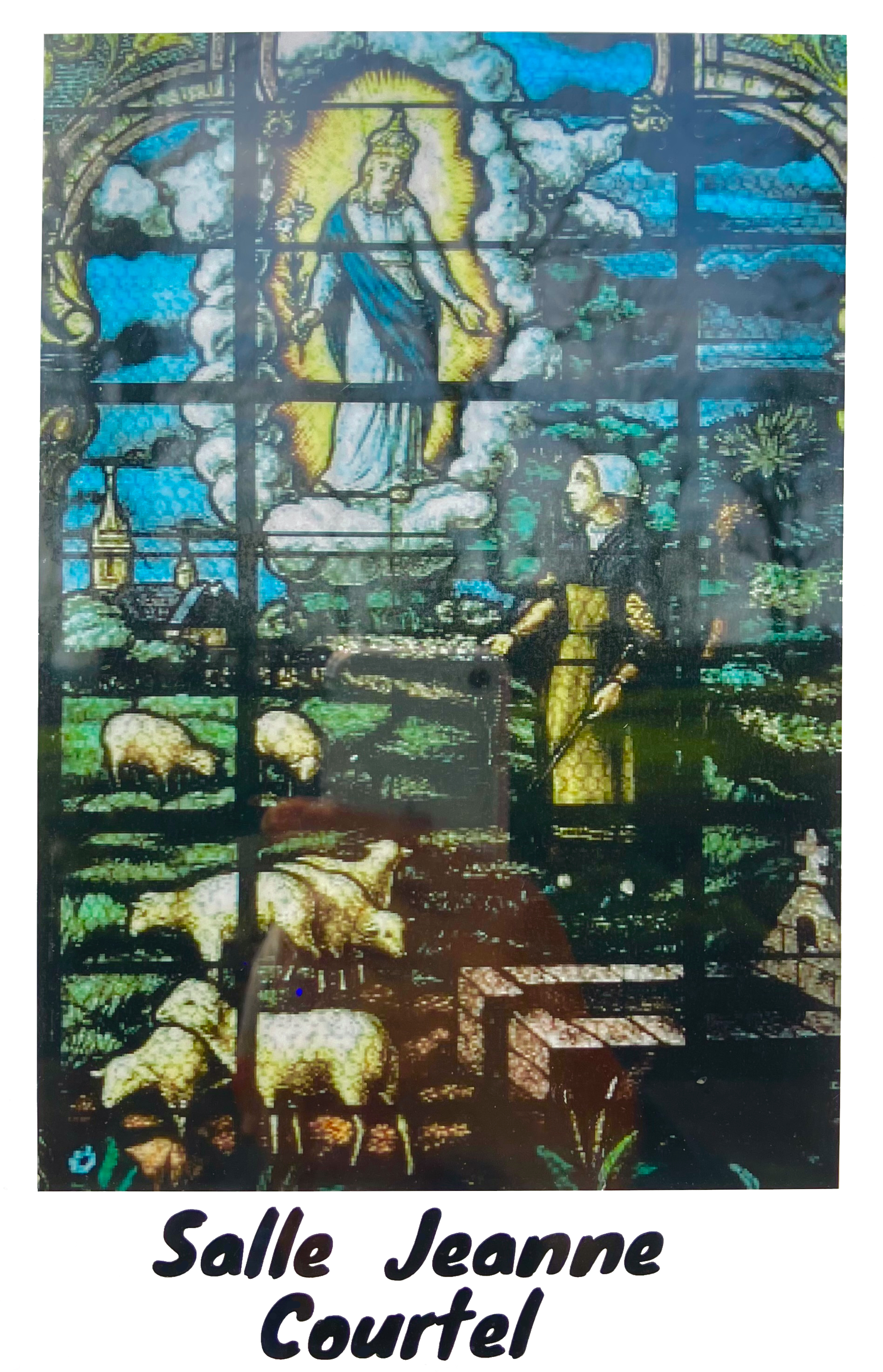
Excerpt from the stained glass window of the apparition of Our Lady of All Help.

The Querrien Marian apparitions refer to the Marian apparitions that happened to Jeanne Courtel (1641-1703), an 11-year-old girl. They occurred from August 15, 1652 until the beginning of September of the same year, in the commune of La Prénessaye, Côtes-d'Armor (France).

Fifteen apparitions were reported. During the first "Marian apparition," a girl deaf and from birth instantly regained her speech and hearing, to the surprise of all the villagers. A few days later the girl asked villagers to dig near the local spring. Legend said it was once the site of a statue of the Virgin Mary. The wooden statuette was exhumed at the indicated spot, confirming the girl's claims to the villagers.

The local bishop, Denis de La Barde, launched an investigation and went to the site to verify the child's statements. Satisfied with his findings, he had a chapel built to organize the devotion of the faithful. This account of the events, written later, does not allow for a precise reconstruction of the visionary's statements.

The apparition was informally validated at the time by the construction of a chapel where the statue was found and the organization of worship. There was no official proclamation of recognition by the bishop of the time. Apparitions two centuries later at similar places like La Salette or Lourdes were officially recognized.

The chapel quickly became a major local pilgrimage site, still frequented today by more than 70,000 pilgrims a year. It is particularly busy during pardons.

== Background ==
The site of the apparitions is the village of Querrien in the parish of La Prénessaye, between Loudéac and Merdrignac, about forty kilometers south of Saint-Brieuc.

This place is marked by the history of the evangelization of Brittany. According to tradition, in 574 the monk Saint Columbanus and twelve Irish companions landed on the Breton coast. Tradition recounts that one of these monks, Saint Gal, founded a hermitage at Montrel in Langast, then went to Querrien where he caused "a spring to gush forth so that people could knead bread there. (Note: "Citation|une source afin que les gens puissent y pétrir du pain.Some sources Lesquelles|date=28 septembre 2022 datent ce Citation|miracle en 610.) The tradition continues saying Gall sculpted a statuette of the Virgin and Child and placed it in a wooden oratory. Over time the oratory was abandoned, crumbling to the ground along with the statue, the statue becoming buried near the spring. The hamlet grew little for ten centuries. By 1652 only about twenty households on six holdings lived around this water source. The parents of the seer Jean and Jeanne Courtel were married (circa 1625) and held one of the holdings.

The account of these events is known to us through a local villager, Olivier Audrain. He recorded all the events that took place in Querrien in September and October 1652. His testimony, in the form of a journal, is the only surviving contemporary document relating to the apparitions. It is kept in the diocesan archives. The modern account of the apparitions was compiled and written by Canon Joseph le Texier, (Note: Joseph Le Texier (1879-1944) est un prêtre du diocèse de Saint-Brieuc (ordonné en 1904), Recteur de Plémy (1930-1939), chanoine honoraire (1943), puis curé-doyen de Merdrignac. Il est tué pendant les combats de la Libération) "the historian of the sanctuary," publishing it in 1926. By doing this he "restored the historicity of the events." Bouflet and Boutry point out that the episcopal declarations made at that time "did not mention the account of the apparitions".

== First appearance ==
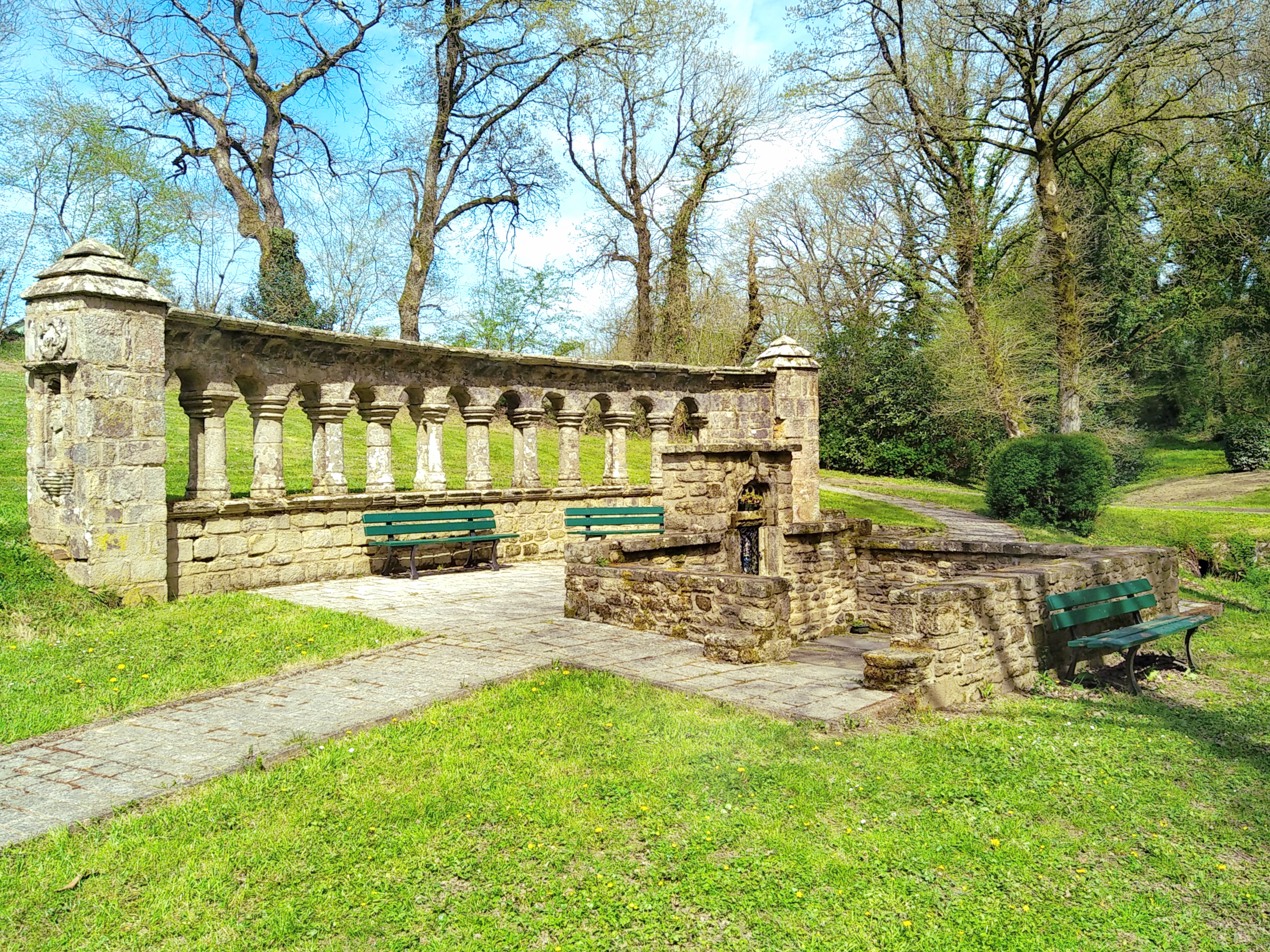
Field of Fontenelles, site of first apparition

On August 15, 1652, eleven-year-old Jeanne Courtel, deaf and mute since birth, was tending the family flock of sheep in the "Field of Fontenelles". (Note: Le « champ des Fontenelles » a été rebaptisé[Quand ?] depuis en « champ des apparitions »[réf. nécessaire]. C'est le nom utilisé à ce jour) Around 6 p.m. the child began to recite the rosary, as was her custom. She then felt as if there was "a gust of wind at her back." Turning around, little Jeanne saw a beautiful young woman, dressed in white satin. The woman smiled at her; she had a shining halo above her head and was standing on a cloud above the ground.

A conversation begins between the woman and the child, and for the first time in her life, Jeanne distinctly hears the words addressed to her:

- Woman: “Charming shepherdess, give me one of your sheep.”
- Child: “These sheep are not mine… they belong to my father. If he wishes to give them to you, I gladly agree.”
- Woman: “Go back to your parents… and ask them for a lamb for me.”
- Child: “But who will tend my flock?”
- Woman: “I myself will tend your sheep!”

The little girl returned to her parents, who were astonished to hear her talking to them:

- Daughter: "Father, a lady came to see me, and she asked me for one of your lambs."
- Father: "Ah! My daughter, if this lady has given you back your voice, we will give her the whole flock,"

== Second appearance ==
Now able to speak, Jeanne went the next day and met again with "the young lady, dressed in white satin." The young lady declared, "I am the Virgin Mary. I have chosen this place to be honored. I want a chapel built for me in the middle of this village. A chapel where people from everywhere would come to pray." Jeanne then returned to her parents to tell them the message from "the lady": "She says she is the Virgin Mary, and that a chapel must be built for her in the middle of the village so that pilgrims can come in droves to honor her. "If you speak the truth, we will ask the bishop to allow us to build her a sanctuary," they replied."

== Other appearances ==
Jeanne indicates that she had other apparitions (Note: Les différentes sources[Lesquelles ?] ne concordent pas toujours sur l’enchaînement et le contenu des apparitions : certaines sources, donnant un récit succinct, elles compactent alors les différentes apparitions (ainsi que leur contenu) en une seule, ou en deux distinctes. Le « Dictionnaire des apparitions » semble plus précis sur ce point. Tous s'accordent sur le contenu et généralement les paroles échangées. Yves Chiron indique « une quinzaine d'apparitions au total ». Il précise que « le calendrier des apparitions et le relevé exact des messages ne peut être historiquement établi ». Nous suivons la chronologie du Dictionnaire.) of the Virgin Mary on August 17, 18 and 20 in different places (the field of Etoubles and that of Bosquereaux). On August 20, the Virgin Mary reportedly told the seer: "As proof that the message I entrust to you comes from heaven, a few steps from the fountain of Saint-Gal [...] an image that was formerly honored will be discovered".

Following the girl's directions, the locals dug up from the mud a wooden statue of the Virgin and Child near the Saint Gall pond... According to tradition, this statue had been carved a thousand years earlier by the Irish monk Saint Gall and preserved in good condition for a thousand years by the spring waters. From that day forward, several pilgrimages were spontaneously organized from the surrounding area to the site of the statue's discovery. Several "miraculous healings" were then reported by the local population. The Church authorities verified and recorded twenty-four of the healings.

== Immediate aftermath ==
=== Jeanne Courtel ===
Jeanne Courtel (1641-1703) was the daughter of poor farmers in the hamlet. (Note: Certaines sources[Lesquelles ?] indiquent que la famille était « pauvre », Yves Chiron indique que ses parents étaient « des paysans aisés ».) She was deaf and mute from birth. The apparition of the Virgin Mary on August 15, 1652, "restored her hearing and speech." She was given the Catholic sacraments of First Communion and Confirmation. She was frequently asked to be a godmother at baptisms or a witness at weddings in the parish. Jeanne married Damien Saulnier, Sieur de la Motte, foreman at the forges of the Duke of Rohan, in 1675. The couple had five children, three of whom died in infancy. She died in Querrien on October 8, 1703. She was buried in the chapel of the sanctuary where her tombstone can be seen in the transept.

=== Investigation and recognition by the Church ===
The rector of La Prénessaye received the young visionary on August 16th. He was cautious and reserved. The discovery of the statue on August 20th did not completely convince him; he remained cautious but not hostile towards the young girl. To request the construction of the chapel, Jeanne went to the bishop at the end of August with some local residents. The Bishop of Saint-Brieuc received her. Denis de La Barde appointed two investigators, including the rector of Querrien, to shed light on these alleged apparitions of the Virgin Mary. The investigators went to the site, interviewed the residents, and drew up official reports. The bishop was then notified of the results of their investigation.

On September 11, 1652, the bishop personally went to Querrien to question Jeanne Courtel and various witnesses. He asked them to confirm their statements under oath. Following this, the bishop issued a positive opinion (Note: Il ne s'agit pas ici d'une reconnaissance canonique comme ce sera le cas à la fin du XIXe siècle pour les apparitions de La Salette, Lourdes et suivantes. À la suite du concile de Trente, un siècle plus tôt, et pour quelques siècles encore, les évêques se contentent d'organiser le culte, après une apparition mariale, sans s'exprimer officiellement dans une proclamation publique, sur l'authenticité de l'apparition.) on the apparition and decided to have a chapel built and organize worship there. On September 29, the bishop returned to bless the foundation stone (Note: Les sources[Lesquelles ?] divergent : certaines disent que c'est l'évêque en personne qui est venu bénir la première pierre, le jour même, d'autres que la bénédiction de l'évêque a eu lieu en avance lors de sa visite du 11 septembre, enfin une autre que c'est le recteur de la paroisse qui bénit la pierre « avec l'autorisation de son évêque ». Tous s'accordent que la pierre a été bénie, par ou avec l'autorisation de l'évêque.) of the future chapel during a celebration that brought together 1,500 pilgrims. (Note: Bouflet et Boutry indiquent pour leur part que la chapelle définitive (actuelle) n'est terminée qu'en aout 1656, mais qu'en 1652, c'était une chapelle provisoire qui avait été érigée.)

A few years later, on August 9, 1656, Bishop Denis de La Barde declared: "Seeing that the devotion of the people to Our Lady of All Help of Querrien continues, and that it is necessary that the people who come from all parts to the place called be assisted, guided and directed in their pious designs, we order that four perpetual chaplaincies shall be erected in order to have masses celebrated there, to sing the divine offices that we shall order, to administer the sacraments, to instruct, catechize and preach to the people". (Note: Bouflet et Boutry indiquent pour leur part que la chapelle définitive (actuelle) n'est terminée qu'en aout 1656, mais qu'en 1652, c'était une chapelle provisoire qui avait été érigée.)

==== Official status ====
There is ambiguity and confusion in a number of statements made both on websites and in various articles in the mainstream press. For example, we frequently read that "Querrien is the only authenticated site of an apparition of the Virgin Mary in Brittany," or "that the Catholic Church has officially recognized". But Bouflet and Boutry clearly state in their study that there is "no mention of an apparition in the ecclesiastical document" establishing the sanctuary and organizing worship there. They add: "the logic of Tridentine practice [consists of] erasing the memory of the miracle and its witness" in order to structure worship there (in accordance with Church canons). For them, the Marian apparitions were not "officially recognized" as those of La Salette, Lourdes, or Fatima would later be. Similarly, Yves Chiron does not specify any official episcopal recognition, apart from the construction of a chapel and the establishment of chaplains to take care of the faithful.

As regards recognition, these apparitions are similar to those of Cotignac, rue du Bac or Notre-Dame de l'Osier where worship is authorized, organized and even encouraged, but for which, to date (in 2021) no bishop or Vatican authority has officially commented on the veracity of the statements of the visionary(ies).

== Chapel development ==
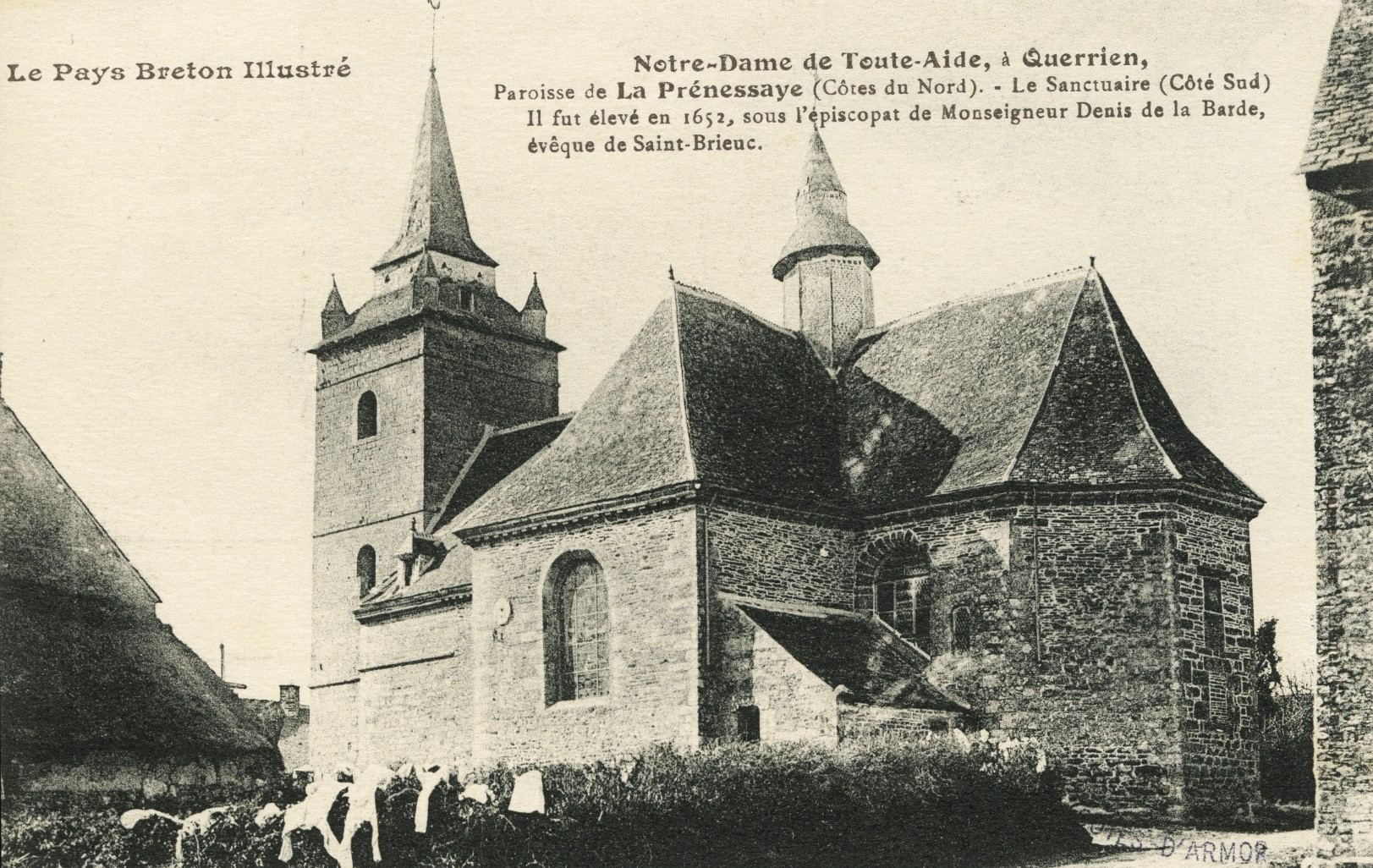
Photo of the chapel around 1920.

A temporary chapel was erected as early as September 1652. (Note: Les différentes sources[Lesquelles ?] n'apportent pas la même précision, toutes parlent de la chapelle construite en 1652, mais quelques-unes sous-entendent qu'elle fut reconstruite 4 ans plus tard. Le site du ministère de la culture indique que la date de construction est 1652, confirmée par une gravure de la date. Il est probable que la construction de la première chapelle s'est étalée sur 4 années.) The chapel was placed on the very spot where the statue had been discovered. The current chapel was built between 1652 and 1656, at the request of Bishop Denis de La Barde. It quickly attracted a large number of pilgrims who came to seek the protection of the Lady of Querrien, honored from the beginning under the title of "Our Lady of All Help". This chapel has a number of elements classified as heritage.

On the 14th, the statue of Our Lady of All Help in the chapel of Querrien was canonically crowned with the authorization of Pope Pius XII.

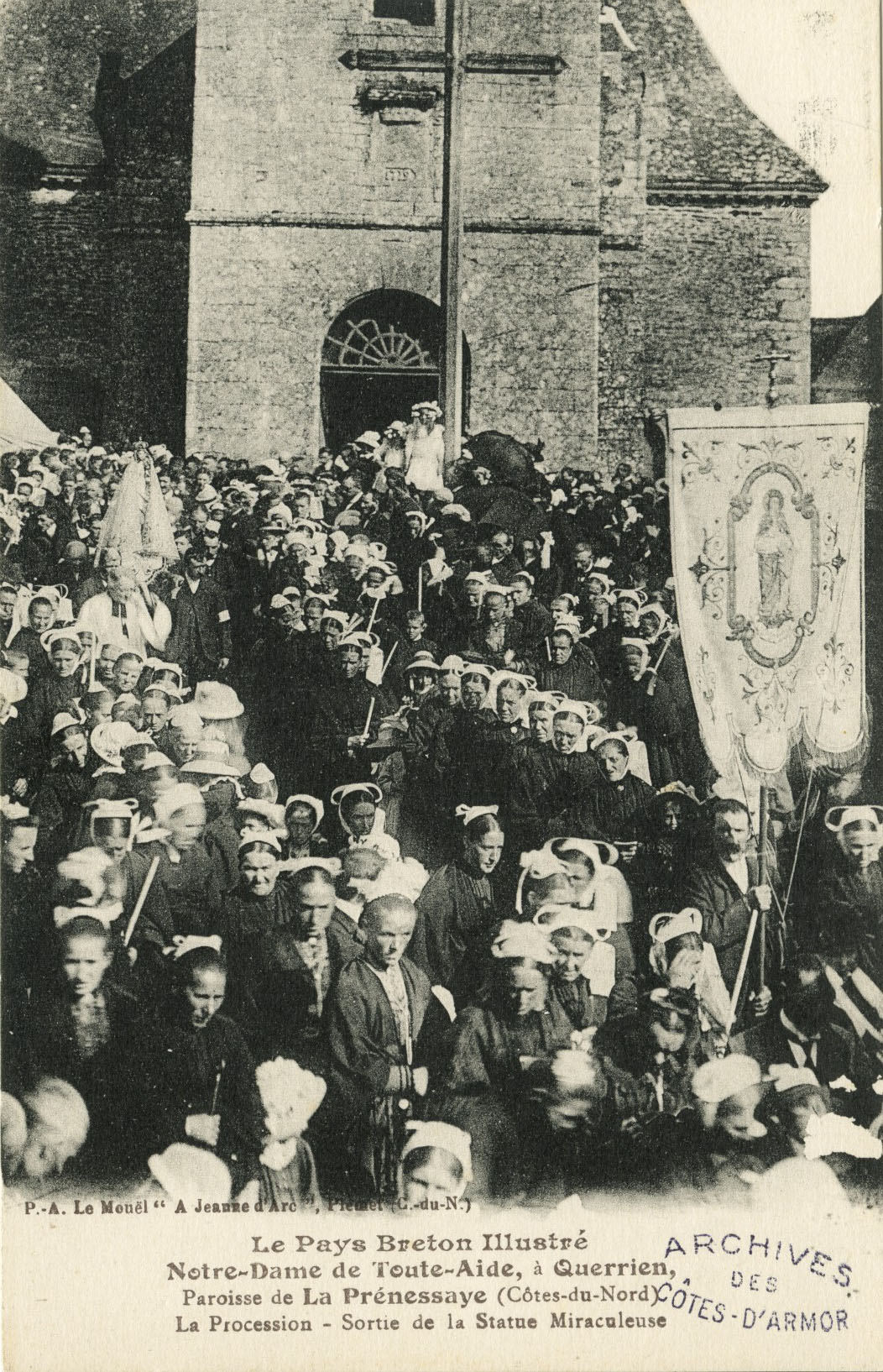
Chapel of Our Lady of All Help, the "miraculous statue" being carried out during a procession. Postcard (c. 1920).

== Persistence of the devotion ==
The Querrien shrine has welcomed pilgrims from all over the world for 350 years. Between 70,000 and 100,000 pilgrims visit each year. The two major pardons are those of August 15 (the Feast of the Assumption) and the second Sunday of September, also known as the "Pardon of the Sick." This latter celebration commemorates September 11, 1652, the date on which the Bishop of Saint-Brieuc came to recognize the authenticity of the apparitions. These two feasts are the dates of greatest attendance, with approximately 10,000 pilgrims at each gathering. These celebrations are presided over by a bishop who may come from outside the diocese.

Another “little pardon” is celebrated on the Sunday closest to October 7: that of the Rosary. The sanctuary of Querrien is nicknamed "the little Breton Lourdes". On the August 14th, 2020, many faithful gathered in the sanctuary for the mass celebrated by the Archbishop of Rennes, Pierre d'Ornellas, on the occasion of the 70th anniversary of the crowning of the statue of Our Lady of All Help. A community of three nuns lives on the site. They look after the shrine of Our Lady of All Help. A faithful association organizes visits to the site and religious activities for pilgrims. Une association de fidèles organise les visites du site et l'animation religieuse pour les pèlerins.

== See also ==
- Chapel of Our Lady of Perpetual Help in Querrien https://fr.wikipedia.org/w/index.php?title=Chapelle_Notre-Dame-de-Toute-Aide_de_Querrien&oldid=234617687
- Normes procédurales pour le discernement des apparitions ou révélations présumées
- List of Marian apparitions
  - List of Marian sancturies in France https://fr.wikipedia.org/w/index.php?title=Liste_de_sanctuaires_mariaux_en_France&oldid=240346158
- Mariology
- Vision (spirituality)
