= Monte Figogna =

Mountain in Italy

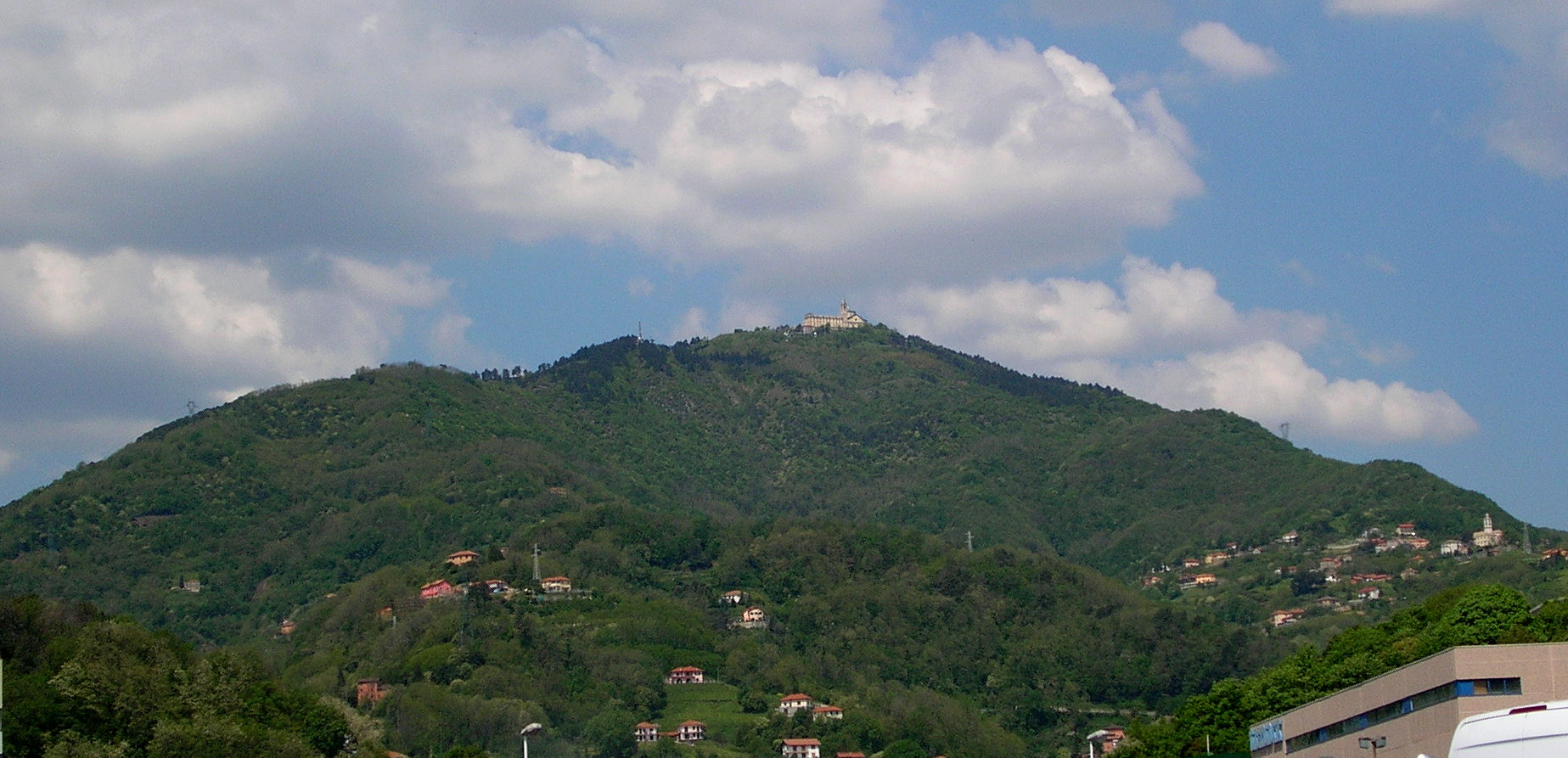

Highest point
- Elevation: 804 m (2,638 ft)
- Prominence: 238 m (781 ft)
- Coordinates: 44.49°N 8.863°E

Geography
- Location within Italy
- Location: Liguria, Italy
- Parent range: Ligurian Apennines

Monte Figogna is a mountain in Liguria, northern Italy, part of the Ligurian Apennines. It is located in the Municipality of Ceranesi, about 20 km from the city of Genoa. It lies at an altitude of 804 metres. In Ligurian, the mountain is called Monte Fighêugna.

On its top is located the shrine of Nostra Signora della Guardia, one of the most important Catholic place of pilgrimage in Liguria.
