= Amalia of Jesus Flagellated =

Brazilian Marian seer

Servant of God Amalia of Jesus Flagellated MJC
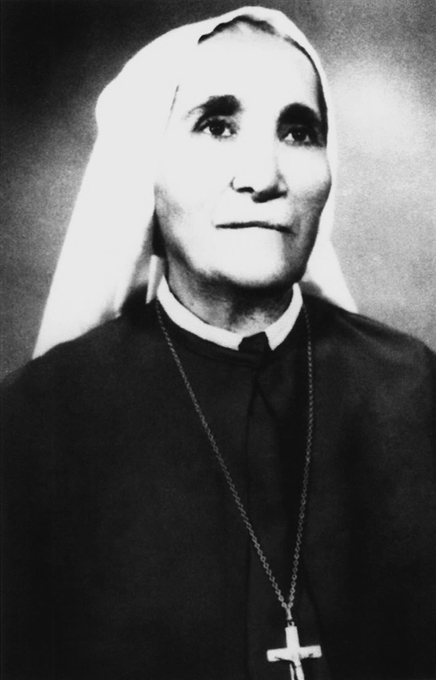
- Portrait of Sister Amalia, seer of Our Lady of Tears of Campinas
- Born: Amalia Aguirre Queija; 22 July 1901; Riós, Spain
- Residence: Convent of the Missionary Sisters of Jesus Crucified
- Died: 18 April 1977 (aged 75); Taubaté, Brazil
- Resting place: Taubaté Cemetery, Brazil

Amalia of Jesus Flagellated MJC (22 July 1901 – 18 April 1977), born Amalia Aguirre Queija, was a Catholic religious sister and mystic. She was co-founder of the institute of the Missionary Sisters of Jesus Crucified, best known for receiving, in the 1930s, the apparitions of Our Lady of Tears in Campinas, Brazil. Among the miraculous events surrounding her life are, among others, visions and stigmata.

== Life ==
Amalia Aguirre Queija was born in 1901 in Riós (Galicia), Spain. Her parents were immigrants to Brazil, however, Amalia, who was pious and devoted to works of charity, stayed in Spain and cared for sufferers of the Great Flu pandemic. In summer 1919, she followed her parents to Brazil. In 1928, she co-founded, with Bishop Francisco de Barreto, a religious institute in Campinas (São Paulo), which was called the Missionaries of Crucified Jesus and took the religious name Amalia de Jesus Flagelado (the Portuguese flagelado in refers to Jesus Christ's torture at the pillar). She lived in the monastery of Campinas until 1953, when she was sent to the House of Our Lady of the Apparition in Taubaté (São Paulo), where she died in 1977.

== Beatification process ==
On March 8, 1931, Francisco de Campos Barreto, Bishop of Campinas, recognized the veracity of the apparitions of Our Lady to Sister Amalia and granted the imprimatur for the publication of sister Amalia's writings (which included the messages of Jesus and the Virgin Mary) and the prayers of the Chaplet of Our Lady of Tears. On February 20, 1934, Bishop Barreto published an episcopal letter reinforcing the importance of devotion to Our Lady of Tears.

On June 16, 2023, Metropolitan Archbishop of Campinas, João Inácio Müller, opened a canonical process for the beatification of Amalia of Jesus Fallegated.

== Bibliography ==
- Renato Carrasquinho; Our Lady of Tears: Apparitions, Messages and Devotion. Book originally published by the International Apostolate of Our Lady of Tears (2017)
- Renato Carrasquinho; Devotionary to Our Lady of Tears. Book [a special edition] originally published by the International Apostolate of Our Lady of Tears (2017)
