= Veiga do Seixo =

Village in Riós, Galicia, Spain

Coordinates: 41°38′N 7°35′W

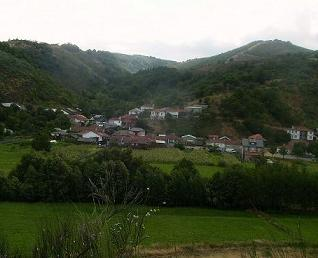
Veiga do Seixo

Veiga do Seixo is a village in the municipality of Riós, in the province of Ourense, Galicia, northwestern Spain. Because it is linked to Portugal by a bridge over the river Mente, the Galician region was historically used for smuggling.

== Administrative division ==
Veiga do Seixo belongs to the parish church of Castrelo de Cima with the villages of Covelas, As Lapedas (already disappeared), O Mourisco and San Payo.

The village is on the border with Portugal (Cisterna). It is 7 km from the rural Portuguese village Edroso de Lomba.

== Climate ==
The village and the surrounding area of Riós has a pronounced Mountain-Mediterranean climate with cold winters and very dry and hot summers, during which devastating fires often occur.

== Fauna and flora ==
Flora include the holm oak (Quercus ilex), turpentine tree (Pistacia terebinthus), Montpellier Maple (Acer monspessulanum). Among the fauna are the European bee-eater (Merops apiaster), red-rumped swallow (Hirundo daurica), European roller (Coracias garrulus), and a rare type of gecko, (Tarentola mauritanica), which is difficult to find in other parts of Galicia.

== Demography ==
The demographic evolution of Veiga do Seixo is marked by the abrupt fall in the population occurred during the decades of the 1950s, 1960s, and 1970s and similar to many other villages in Galicia where there was a massive emigration to bigger and more industrialized Spanish territories like the Basque Country, Catalonia and Madrid. It was also remarkable the number of people that emigrated to Switzerland and Argentina, also known as the fifth Galicia due to the enormous number of Galicians in that country. Nowadays the risk of depopulation is alarmingly high with almost all the inhabitants being over 65, a very low birthrate and few possibilities for young people to develop any career. The village also does not have any infrastructure.

== Transport ==
There is no public transport at all, such as buses or trains and the only way to travel around is by private taxi. The closest train station is A Gudiña, 20 km.

== Folklore ==
The patronal feasts are celebrated on 26 and 27 July in honour of the patron saint of the village Santa Ana, or Santiña as the locals call it. The celebrations are possible thanks to the money gathered from all the people of the village. It is typical before the music starts to prepare the drink Queimada.

It is known that a long time ago a big carnival was celebrated in the village with handmade masks and costumes called vellaróns. Although the traditions have been lost with the passing of the years, the parish church of Riós is trying to recover them within the framework of the famous Carnaval of Verín.
