= Our Lady of Warraq =

Believed, by some, to be a mass apparition of the Virgin Mary

- Claimed apparition of Mary above the middle dome of the Virgin Mary and Archangel Michael Church.
- Location: Giza, Egypt
- Date: December 11th 2009
- Type: Marian Apparition

Our Lady of Warraq is believed by many to be a mass apparition of the Virgin Mary that occurred at the Coptic Orthodox Virgin Mary and Archangel Michael church, in Warraq al-Hadar, Giza, Egypt, in the early hours (1:00 am – 4:00 am) of Friday 11 December 2009.

== Apparition ==
The first person who saw the alleged apparition of Mary was reportedly an Egyptian Muslim neighbour, who was sitting at his coffee shop nearby, when he apparently saw a strong light coming from the Coptic Christian place of worship. He and others are said to have observed the light condense into a female form. However, unlike the Copts, majority of Muslims were not convinced, and other early witnesses who lived in the area claimed to have only seen lights and flashes, but not the Virgin Mary.

Mary supposedly appeared above the middle dome of the church. The reported apparition is then said to have moved between the domes and on to the top of the church gate between its two twin towers in front of the central church building. A large number of local residents reported seeing the alleged apparition of Mary. A representative of the Coptic Orthodox Church of Alexandria had approved the apparitions in early 2010.

== Press coverage ==
This event was widely covered by Egyptian newspapers, Arabic TV channels and by the international press. The news about the apparitions appeared in multiple newspapers, including the Egyptian Watani, American Los Angeles Times, Egyptian Al-Ahram, Italian AsiaNews, Egyptian Almasry Alyoum, and Egyptian Bikya Masr.

A December 24, 2009, Agence France Presse (AFP) article recounted nightly gatherings bringing crowds of up to 10,000 people to watch the tower in anticipation of the "mysterious light over the church tower", which upon its appearance each night "jolt[ed] the gathering into a frenzy of cries an ululations". This article was duplicated by several news agencies, including the Assyrian International News Agency, Sudan Vision Daily, Daily Star, and British Middle East Online.

News outlets also reported controversy, with Egyptians being divided on the issue. Dissenters were claiming it was a hoax to strengthen people's religious convictions. As the event occurred during the chaos of 2009 which had some sectarian clashes, and such apparitions occur when Egypt is in turmoil. Reverend Rifat Fikry said it was misleading the poor and naive, while other bishops in an investigative panel had endorsed it. The chairman of the Evangelical publishing committee in Egypt said rumours of apparitions should not be used to play with ordinary people's faith, and such claims are even manipulative.

In 2012, a God Discussion reporter documented contentious debate created by a video from a Swedish skeptic, who claimed that the apparition was just the illuminated tower (also called minaret) behind the church's domes as seen from different angles, and is an instance of pareidolia.

== Sociology of religion ==
Anthropologist Angie Heo evaluated the 2009 claimed apparitions at El-Warraq within the context of inter Coptic-Muslim relations, media technologies and social dynamics in modern Egypt.

== See also ==
- Coptic Orthodox Church
- List of Marian apparitions
- Marian apparition
- Our Lady of Assiut
- Our Lady of Zeitoun
