= Riós =

- municipality
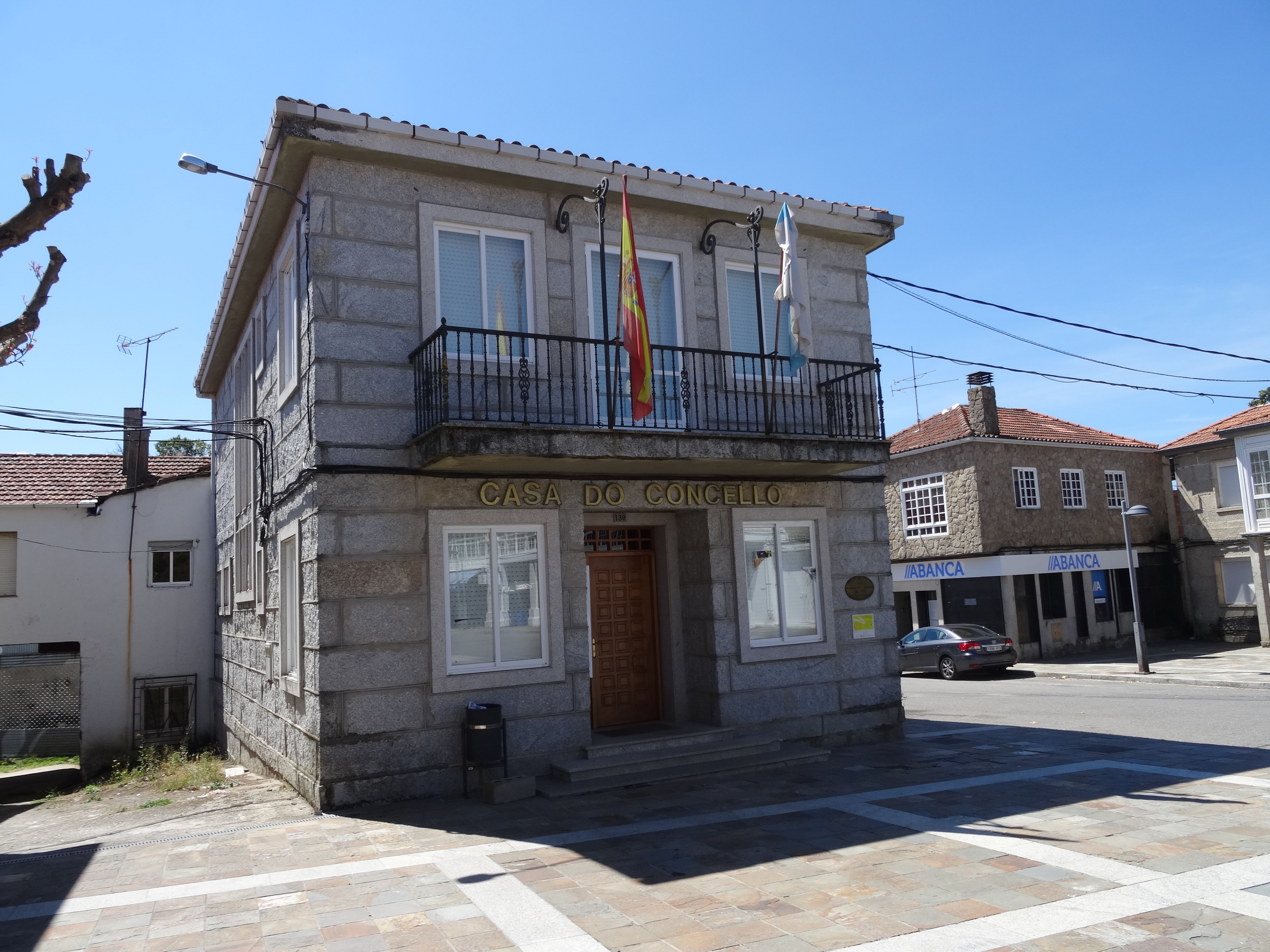
- Town hall.

- Flag Coat of arms

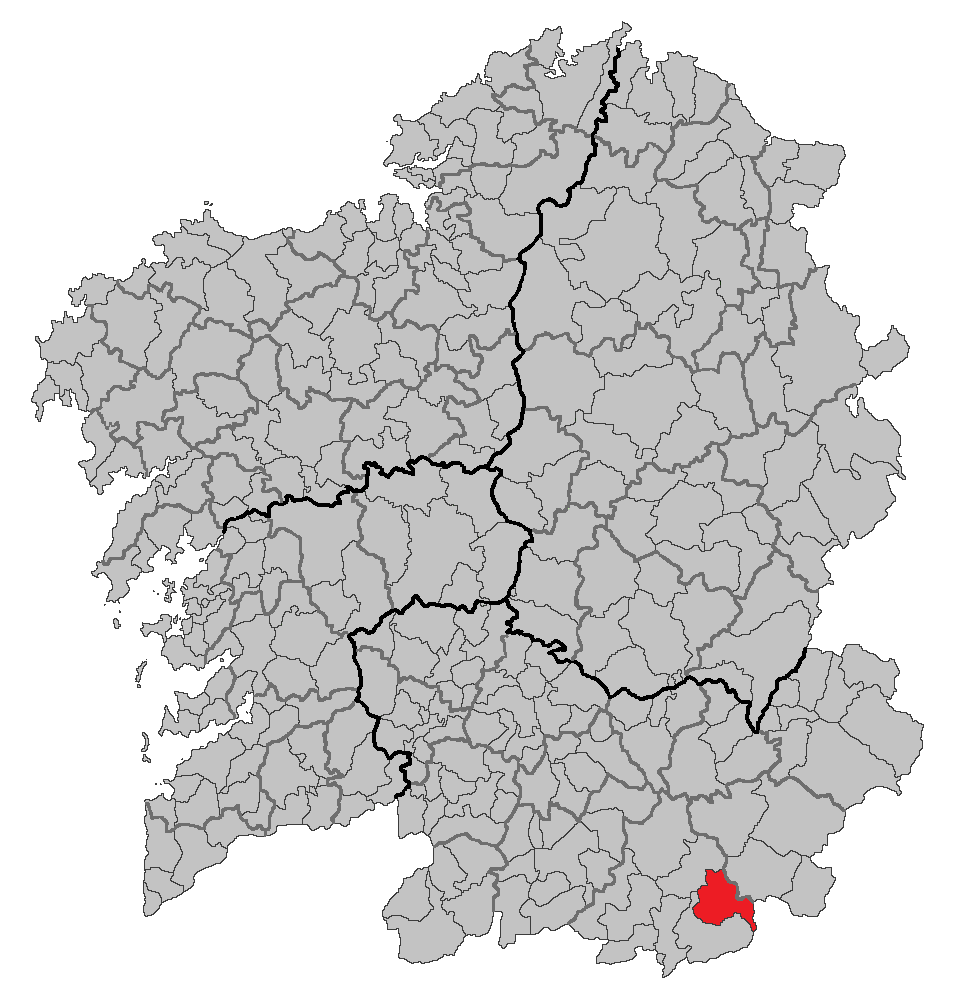
- Location in Galicia

- Location in Spain
- Coordinates: 41°58′27″N 7°16′57″W
- Country: Spain
- Autonomous community: Galicia
- Province: Ourense
- Comarca: Verín

Government
  - Mayor: Francisco Armando Veiga Romero (People's Party)

Area
  - Total: 94.1 km^{2} (36.3 sq mi)
- Elevation: 805 m (2,641 ft)

Population (2025-01-01)
  - Total: 1,379
  - Density: 14.7/km^{2} (38.0/sq mi)
- Time zone: UTC+1 (CET)
  - Summer (DST): UTC+2 (CEST)
- Website: www.concelloderios.es/

Riós is a municipality in the province of Ourense, in the autonomous community of Galicia, Spain. It belongs to the comarca of Verín. It has a population of 2032 (Spanish 2006 Census) and an area of 114 km².

== See also ==
- Veiga do Seixo

== Bibliography ==
- Xosé Lois Foxo. Cancioneiro das Terras do Riós, Vol. I. Diputación Provincial de Ourense, 2007.
- R. Otero Pedrayo, Historia de Galiza, Ed. Nos, 1962
- Xerardo Dasairas Valsa. Crónicas rexiomontanas, Mancomunidade de Concellos da Comarca de Monterrei, 1999
- Xerardo Dasairas Valsa. O Entroido en Terras de Monterrrei. Edicións do Cumio, 1990.
- Pedro González de Ulloa. Descripción de los Estados de la Casa de Monterrey en Galicia (1777). CEG, anexo IV 1950
- Fernando Cabeza Quiles. Os Nomes de Lugar. Ed. Xerais, 1992
