= Shrine of Nostra Signora della Guardia =

Coordinates: 44.490°N 8.863°E

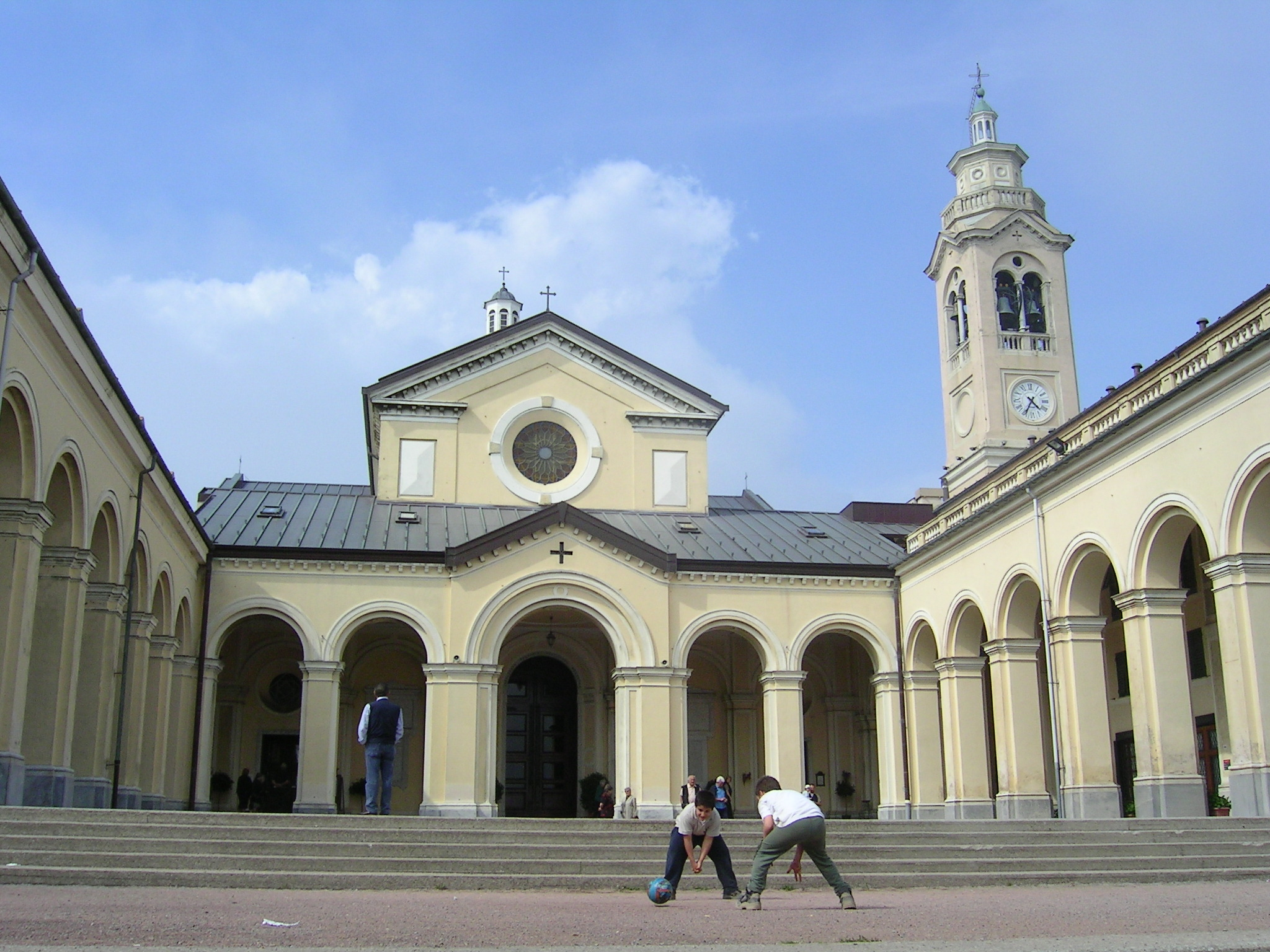
- Santuario di Nostra Signora della Guardia

- Location within Italy
- Location: Ceranesi, Genoa, Liguria, Italy

Site notes
- Architectural style: Neo-Renaissance
- Website: www.santuarioguardia.it

The Shrine of Nostra Signora della Guardia ("Our Lady of the Watch") is a Roman Catholic place of pilgrimage located on the top of Monte Figogna (804 m asl) in the Municipality of Ceranesi, about 20 kilometres (12 miles) from the city of Genoa, in the northwest of Italy.

It is the most important Marian shrine in Liguria.

The name "Guardia" in Italian means "watch", and the shrine is so called because in the Middle Ages Mount Figogna was a strategic observation station for monitoring the movement of armies along the Valpolcevera and of ships on the sea in the approaches to Genoa. From the pavement in front of the shrine, on a clear day, it is possible to look over all the Polcevera valley below, part of the city of Genoa, and the Ligurian Riviera. On a very clear day, mainly in winter, the skyline of the mountains of the French island of Corsica can also be seen.

The shrine is the destination of pilgrims from Genoa and from and all over Italy. The cult has been spread throughout Italy and far beyond, so that many churches and shrines have been dedicated to Nostra Signora della Guardia.

== History ==
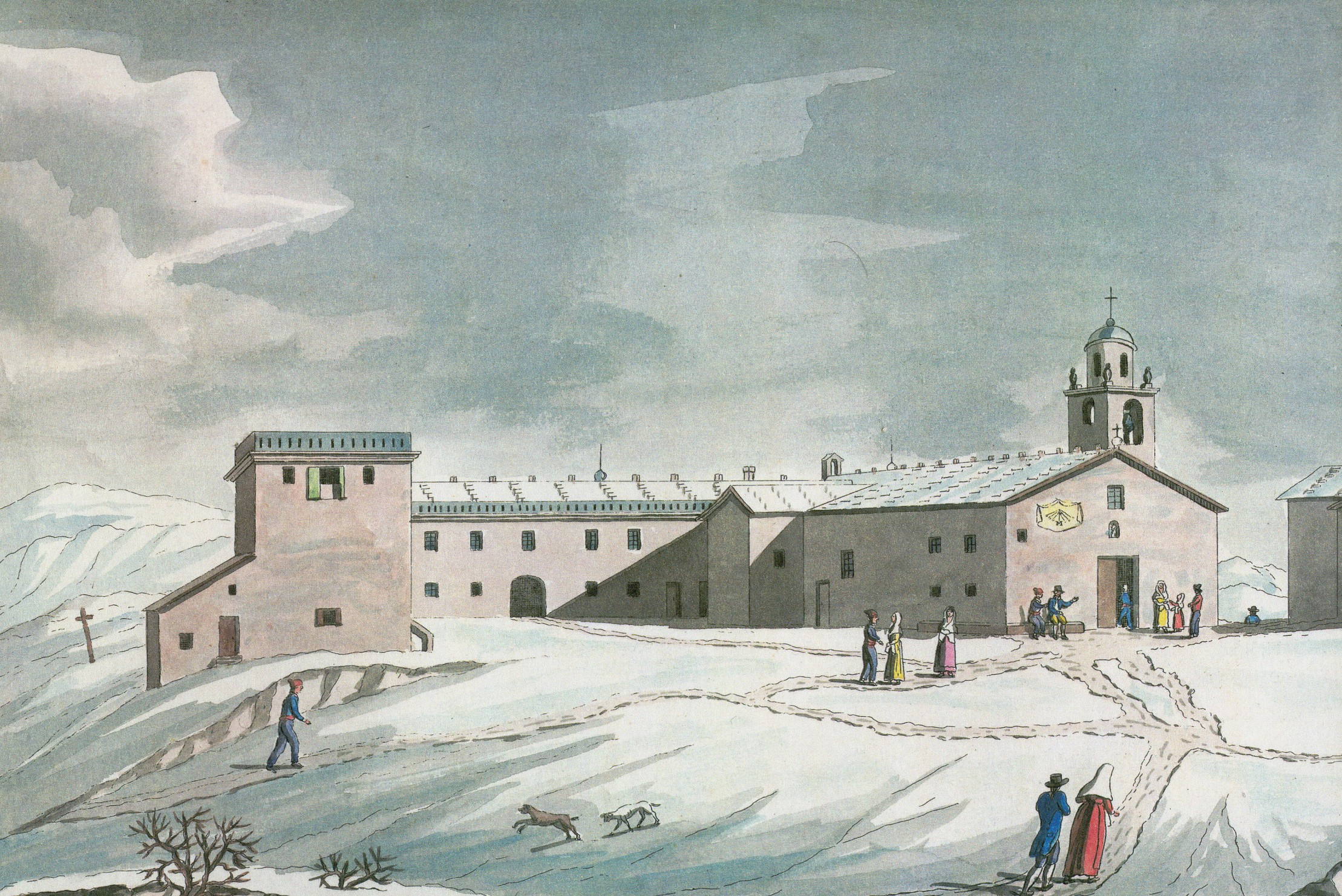
The old shrine, watercolour by Marco Nicolosino (1820)

According to tradition, on August 29, 1490, the Virgin Mary appeared to a peasant called Benedetto Pareto and asked him to build a chapel on the mountain. Pareto was surprised and replied that he was only a poor man and would not be able to do that. But the Virgin Mary exhorted him by saying "Do not be afraid!"

Nevertheless, Pareto went home and did not tell anyone about the apparition. A few days later, he fell from a tree and was seriously injured. The Virgin Mary appeared to him again and he was miraculously healed. The event convinced him to speak about the apparition and to seek help to build the chapel.

=== The first chapel ===
According to tradition, the first chapel was built by Pareto himself at the site of the apparition. It is a small rectangular building with a wooden roof, now inside the new chapel. Within a niche is a marble Madonna dated 1530.

=== The shrine ===
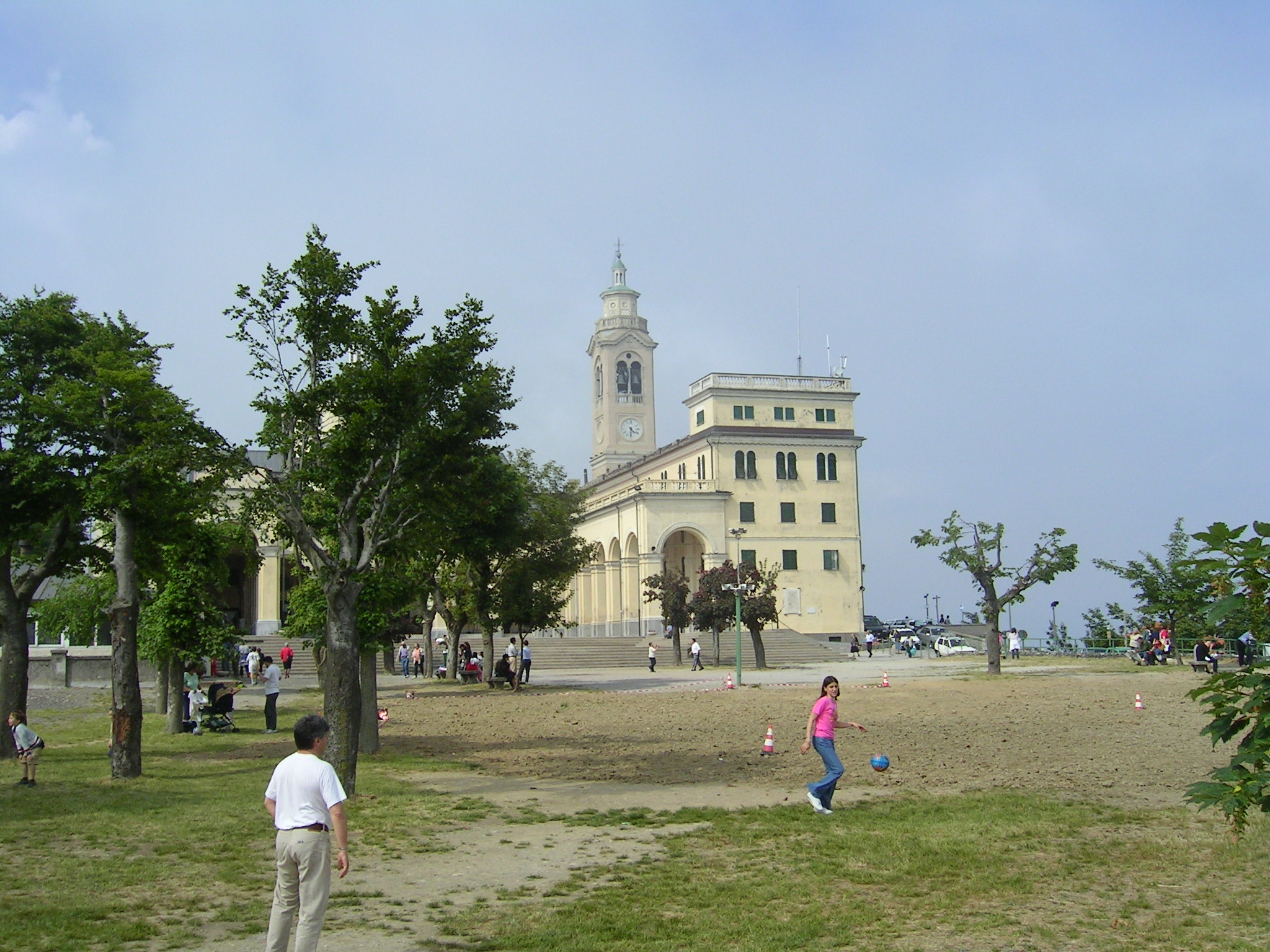
The Shrine seen from the esplanade

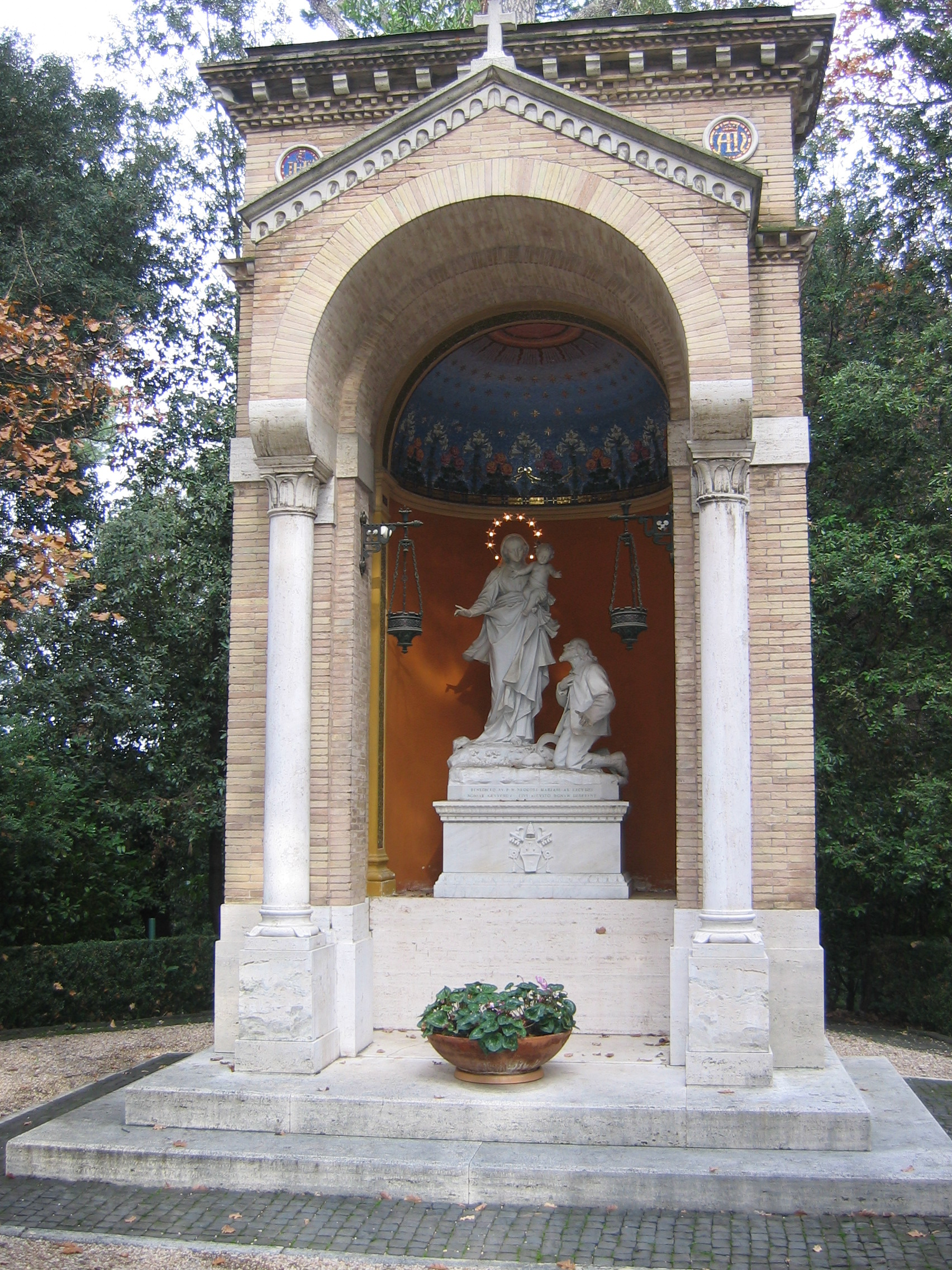
The small temple of N.S. della Guardia in the Gardens of Vatican City

Due to the increasing flow of pilgrims, a new shrine was built on the top of the mountain between 1528 and 1530, thanks to a donation of the noble Ghersi family. Near the shrine a hospice for the pilgrims was also built, and this was rebuilt at the end of the 18th century. In the second half of the 19th century, a new shrine was built. There were both technical and financial setbacks, but the church was completed in 1889 and inaugurated on May 26, 1890.

In the following years, the number of pilgrims continued to grow, and in 1903 the old church was demolished to make room for a new hospice and guesthouse for the pilgrims.

On March 11, 1915, the Genoese Pope Benedict XV gave the church the title of Basilica. Then, in 1917, Benedict built a small temple in the gardens of the Vatican City where a statue of Our Lady of the Watch (given to the Pope by the Genoese people) was enshrined.

In 1929 in Ceranesi, a railway line (known as the "Autoguidovia") was constructed, which allowed pilgrims to reach the shrine from the bottom of the valley. Before this the only way up was on foot. In 1963, a new road for vehicles was built (provincial road No 52 from Bolzaneto, 11 kilometres (7 miles) long), and in 1967 the "Autoguidovia" was considered to not be economical and was closed.

On September 22, 1985, the shrine was visited by Pope John Paul II, and on May 18, 2008, by Pope Benedict XVI.

Pope Francis while visiting Genoa on May 27, 2017, visited also the shrine, and here he had a lunch with a group of poor people, inmates and refugees.

== Structure of the basilica ==
The new church was designed by Guglielmo Calmieri. It has a Latin cross shape with three aisles. The main aisle is painted with frescoes (1963) by the Genoese painter Antonio Santagata (1888–1985) with scenes of the life of the Virgin Mary. The frescoes in the dome, painted by the Lombard painter Pasquale Arzuffi (1897–1965), represent Mary surrounded by the Republic of Genoa patron saints.

In the church are also other statues representing the Virgin Mary and saints (St. John the Baptist, St. Joseph, St. Eusebius) and on the left of the high altar, a black procession crucifix.

A door in the left aisle leads to the hall of offerings, where hundreds of paintings, photos and objects have been left by people to express their gratitude to the Virgin Mary for having been curing or protecting them from illnesses, accidents, wars and shipwrecks.

== See also ==
- Roman Catholic Marian churches
