= L'Île-Bouchard =

- Commune
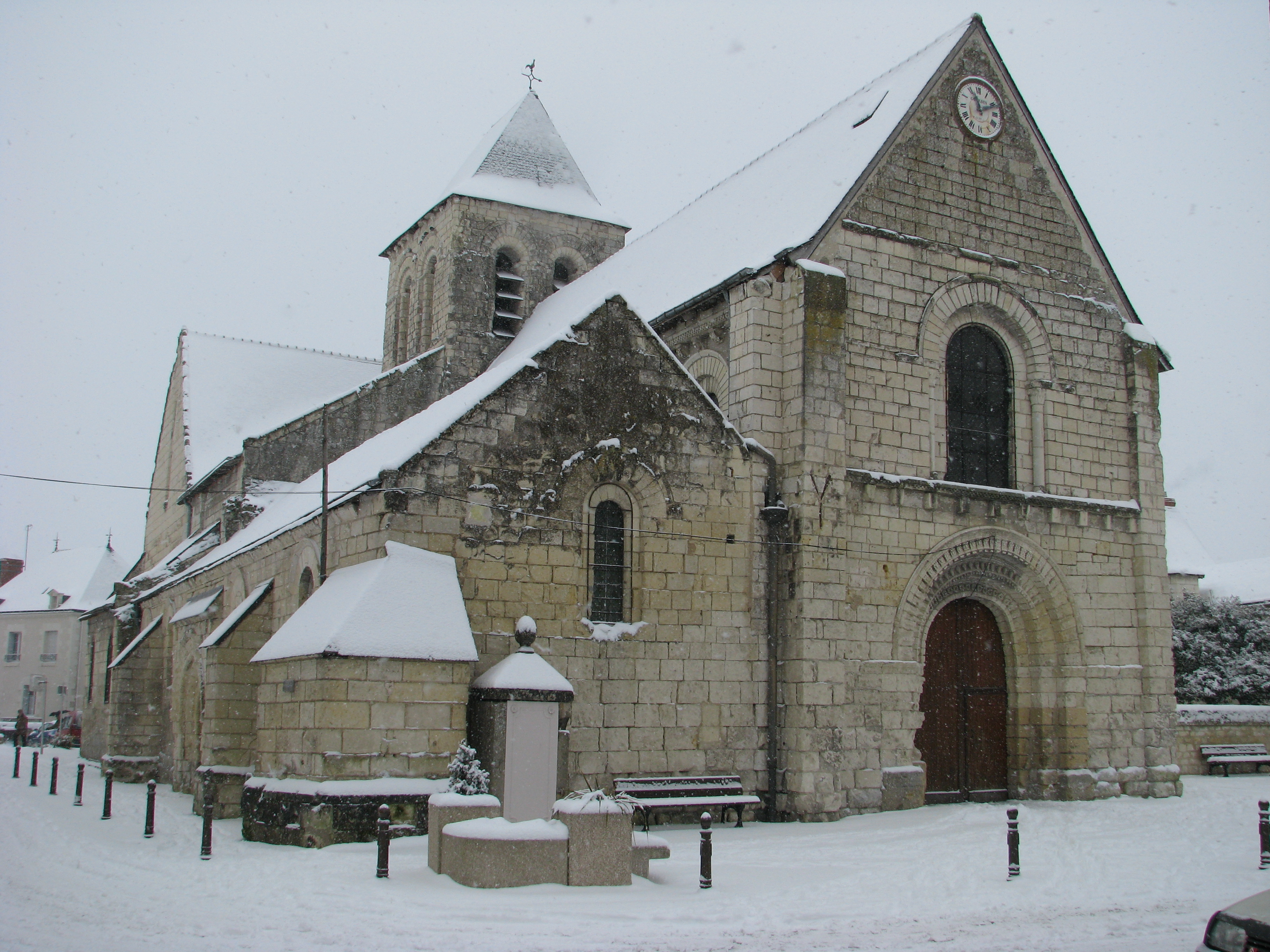
- The church of Saint-Gilles, in L'Ile-Bouchard, in the snow

- Coat of arms
- Location of L'Île-Bouchard
- Location within France Location within Centre-Val de Loire
- Coordinates: 47°07′15″N 0°25′32″E
- Country: France
- Region: Centre-Val de Loire
- Department: Indre-et-Loire
- Arrondissement: Chinon
- Canton: Sainte-Maure-de-Touraine

Government
  - Mayor (2020–2026): Nathalie Vigneau
- Area^{1}: 3.48 km^{2} (1.34 sq mi)
- Highest elevation: 65 m (213 ft)
- Lowest elevation: 33 m (108 ft)
- Population (2023): 1,606
  - Density: 461/km^{2} (1,200/sq mi)
- Time zone: UTC+01:00 (CET)
  - Summer (DST): UTC+02:00 (CEST)
- INSEE/Postal code: 37119 /37220
- ^{1} French Land Register data, which excludes lakes, ponds, glaciers > 1 km^{2} (0.386 sq mi or 247 acres) and river estuaries.

L'Île-Bouchard (French pronunciation: [lil buʃaʁ]) is a commune in the Indre-et-Loire department in central France.

From 8 to 14 December 1947, L'Île-Bouchard was the site of Marian apparitions. Four girls aged 7 to 12 reported having seen the Virgin Mary and the archangel Gabriel. The site was declared an official pilgrimage of the diocese of Tours on 8 December 2001 by the archbishop Monseigneur André Vingt-Trois. Since 1999, priests and lay persons from Emmanuel Community have been in charge of the pilgrims.

== Population ==
Historical population
Year	Pop.	±% p.a.
1968	1,645	—
1975	1,762	+0.99%
1982	1,796	+0.27%
1990	1,800	+0.03%
1999	1,764	−0.22%
2007	1,740	−0.17%
2012	1,655	−1.00%
2017	1,553	−1.26%
2023	1,606	+0.56%
Source: INSEE

== See also ==
- Communes of the Indre-et-Loire department
