= Ceranesi =

Ceranesi Çianexi (Ligurian)
- Comune
- Comune di Ceranesi
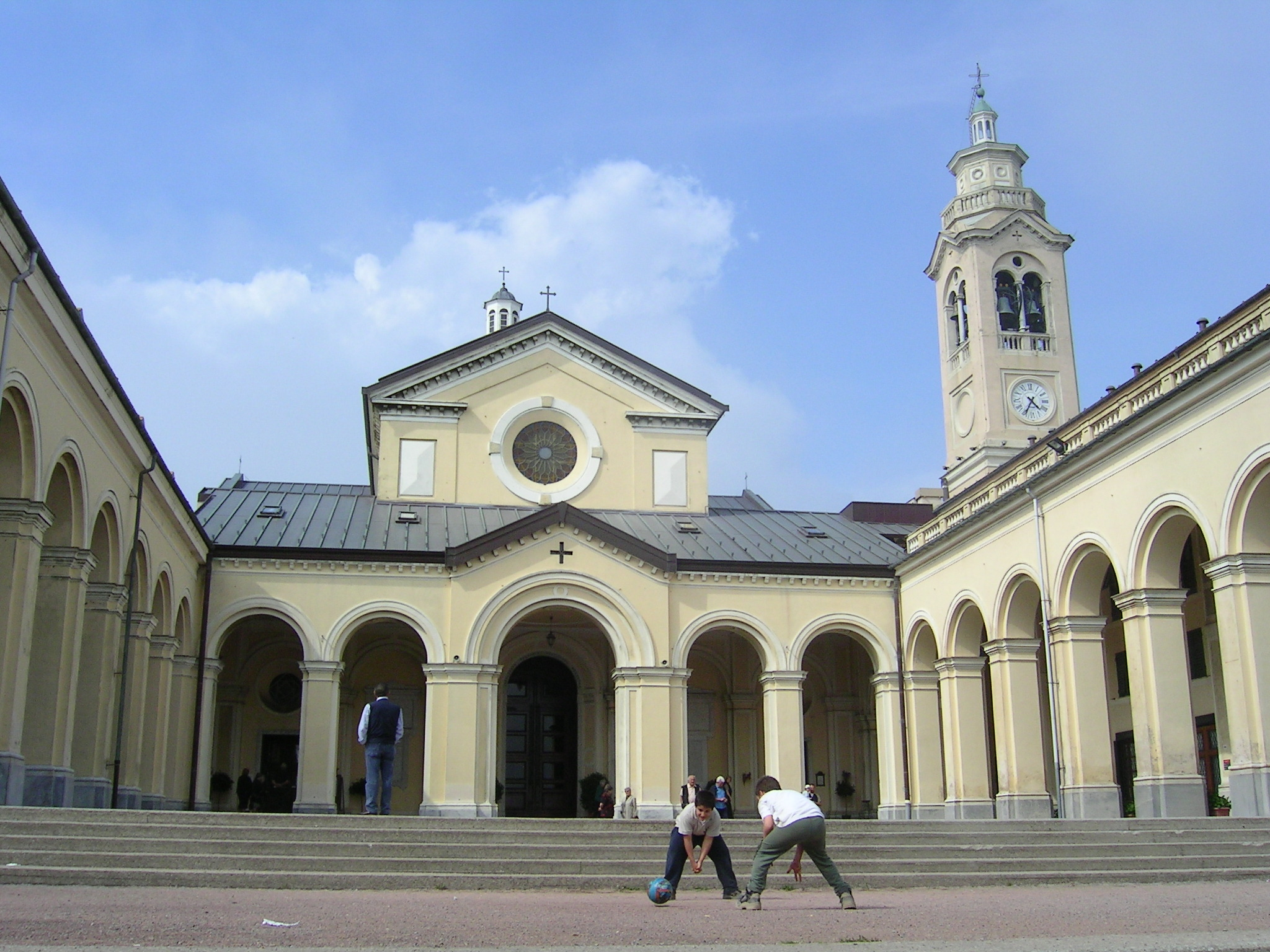
- Shrine of N.S. della Guardia.

- Coat of arms

- Location within Italy Location within Liguria
- Coordinates: 44°30′N 8°52′E
- Country: Italy
- Region: Liguria
- Metropolitan city: Genoa (GE)
- Frazioni: Ceranesi-Gaiazza, Geo, Livellato, San Martino di Paravanico, Torbi

Government
  - Mayor: Mauro Vigo

Area
  - Total: 30.9 km^{2} (11.9 sq mi)
- Elevation: 80 m (260 ft)

Population (31 December 2009)
  - Total: 3,983
  - Density: 129/km^{2} (334/sq mi)
- Demonym: Ceranesotti
- Time zone: UTC+1 (CET)
  - Summer (DST): UTC+2 (CEST)
- Postal code: 16014
- Dialing code: 010
- Website: Official website

Ceranesi (Italian: [tʃeˈraːnezi]; Ligurian: Çianexi [ˈsjaːneʒi]) is a comune (municipality) in the Metropolitan City of Genoa in the Italian region Liguria, located about 11 kilometres (7 mi) northwest of Genoa.

The Municipality of Ceranesi includes also the Shrine of N.S. della Guardia, the most important Marian shrine in Liguria.

Ceranesi borders the following municipalities: Bosio, Campomorone, Genoa.
