= Our Lady of Tears =

Marian apparitions in Brazil

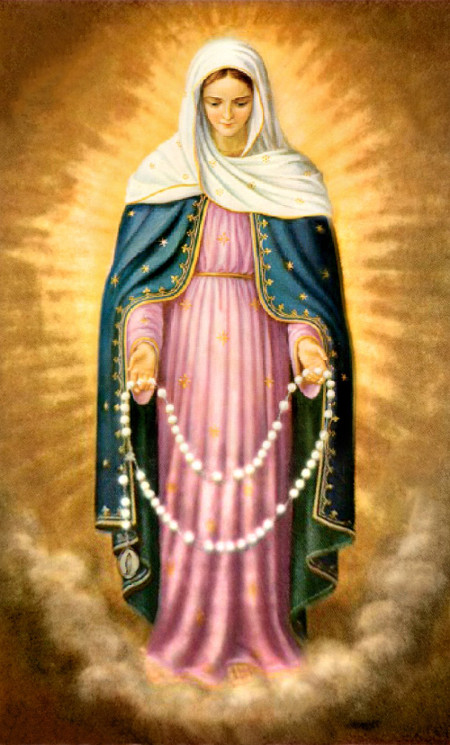
- Painting with the apparition of Our Lady of Tears to Sister Amália of Jesus Flagelado in Campinas – Brazil
- Location: Campinas, São Paulo, Brazil
- Date: 1930
- Witness: Amália de Jesus Flagelado
- Type: Marian apparition
- Approval: March 8, 1931; Bishop Francisco de Campos Barreto; Archdiocese of Campinas

Our Lady of Tears (Portuguese: Nossa Senhora das Lágrimas) is one of the Marian invocations attributed to the Virgin Mary. This Brazilian invocation originated in the apparitions received by Sister Amalia of Jesus Flagellated in 1930.

The apparitions appeared in the chapel of the convent of the Congregation of the Missionary Sisters of Jesus Crucified, located in the city of Campinas, State of São Paulo, Brazil.

== History ==
=== The monastery ===
The Congregation of the Missionary Sisters of Jesus Crucified was founded in 1928 by Bishop Francis of Campos Barreto, Bishop of Campinas, and Mother Maria Villac, who lived with Sister Amalia de Jesus Flagelado, a Spanish Galician nun. Sister Amalia (born Amália Aguirre) was co-founder of the Congregation and part of the group of first sisters.

=== Apparitions ===
Sister Amalia received the phenomenon of the stigmata, as well as several Marian apparitions. These appeared in the chapel on Benjamin Constant Avenue, no. 1344, in Campinas, State of São Paulo. On March 8, 1930, the Virgin Mary presented herself as Our Lady of Tears and revealed to her the Crown (or Rosary) of Tears.

Both the Virgin Mary and Jesus Christ appeared several times to Sister Amalia, communicating many messages to her with calls for prayer, sacrifice and penance.

== Ecclesiastical recognition ==
On March 8, 1931, Monsignor Francisco de Campos Barreto, Bishop of Campinas, recognized the veracity of the phenomena of stigmata and the apparitions received by Sister Amalia. He granted the proper authorizations - among them, the Imprimatur - for the publication of all her writings (which included the original messages of Jesus and Our Lady) and the prayers of the Crown (or Rosary) of Our Lady of Tears. On February 20, 1934, he published an episcopal declaration and reinforced the importance of devotion to the Virgin Mary under the invocation of Our Lady of Tears.

In 1935, the Crown of Our Lady of Tears received more authorizations for its dissemination: by Archbishop John Robert Roach of the Archdiocese of Saint Paul and Minneapolis, Minnesota (United States); bishop Michael James Gallagher of the Diocese of Detroit, Michigan (United States); the diocesan censor in Sopron (Hungary); Bishop Stephanus Breyer of the Diocese of Győr (Hungary); and also by Vicar General Ferdinand Buchwieser of the Archdiocese of Munich and Freising (Germany).

== Bibliography ==
- Renato Carrasquinho; Our Lady of Tears: Apparitions, Messages and Devotion. Book originally published by the International Apostolate of Our Lady of Tears (2017)
- Renato Carrasquinho; Devotionary to Our Lady of Tears. Book [a special edition] originally published by the International Apostolate of Our Lady of Tears (2017)
