= San Francisco de Cuapa =

- Municipality
- Piedra de Cuapa

- Location in Nicaragua
- Coordinates: 12°16′N 85°23′W
- Country: Nicaragua
- Department: Chontales Department

Area
  - Municipality: 107 sq mi (277 km^{2})

Population (2005)
  - Municipality: 5,507
  - Density: 51.5/sq mi (19.9/km^{2})
  - Urban: 3,500

San Francisco de Cuapa (Spanish pronunciation: [saɱ fɾanˈsisko ðe ˈkwapa]) is a municipality in the Chontales Department of Nicaragua. This municipality was created July 30, 1997 and is located in the northeast section of Chontales. Before that date, the town was part of the municipality of Juigalpa. Its area is about 277 km^{2} (107 sq mi). The principal business activity is the cattle and agriculture. 99% of the population is Catholic. The first mayor was Manuel Antonio Zelaya Meneses and the vice-mayor was Oscar Velasquez Gonzalez. They were elected in 1997.

== Reported apparition of the Virgin Mary ==
In 1980, Bernardo Martínez, sacristan, claimed to have a series of visions of the Virgin Mary. According to Bernardo, this began on April 15 when he saw a strange light emanating from a statue of the Virgin Mary in the parish church. In May, when walking through the fields, he claimed that he saw a vision of the Virgin Mary, who encouraged him to pray the rosary and promote peace saying: "Make Peace. Don't ask Our Lord for peace because, if you do not make it, there will be no peace."

At this time, Nicaragua was going through a civil war. The Sandinista government was facing armed opposition from the Contras. Bernardo Martinez claimed that the Virgin Mary ordered him to burn bad books, which was interpreted to mean Marxist books. The auxiliary Bishop of Managua complied with this request. Sandinista commentators responded by describing the apparition as 'St. Mary of the Contras', 'Our Lady of Oliver North and Our Lady of Cuapa.

On November 13, 1982, the Bishop of Juigalpa released an official statement as Bishop of the area where the apparitions took place assuring the faithful of the authenticity of the events. The apparitions at San Francisco de Cuapa are thus among the few Marian apparitions approved by the Catholic Church in the twentieth century.

In 2005, Silvio Sirias wrote a novel, Bernardo and the Virgin based on these events.

== Piedra de Cuapa ==
The Piedra de Cuapa (Rock of Cuapa) or Monolito de Cuapa (Monolith of Cuapa) is a prominent landmark in San Francisco de Cuapa. According to a Nicaraguan folk-tale, it is inhabited by a duende, or perhaps a whole family of duendes. According to the legend, a duende fell in love with a young woman named Flor, and stole her family's donkey, which they placed on top of the Piedra. Eventually, the family was able to defeat the duendes by playing loud music.

Other local folklore includes a tree that is said to shed tears from its branches at midnight, and the legend that any man who bathes in a particular place will marry a woman from the area and never leave.
