= Our Lady of Assiut =

Marian apparition in Assiut, Egypt

- Location: Assiut, Egypt
- Date: 2000 - 2001
- Type: Marian Apparition

Our Lady of Assiut is the name given to a series of reported apparitions of the Virgin Mary in 2000 and 2001 in Assiut, Egypt.

== History ==
The apparitions of Our Lady of Assiut were mass apparitions in Assiut, Egypt, during 2000 and 2001. Thousands of witnesses were said to have produced photographs of them, which were reprinted in several newspapers at the time. According to newspaper reports, during a Divine Liturgy, pictures showing the virgin Mary with a dove above her that were hung on the wall inside the altar began to glow, after which the light from the dove in the pictures started to flow down. Later, the lights were said to have appeared above the church as well. The Coptic Church would then approve of the apparition.

== See also ==
- Coptic Orthodox Church
- Our Lady of Warraq
- Our Lady of Zeitoun
