= La Prénessaye =

La Prénessaye Perenezeg
- Commune
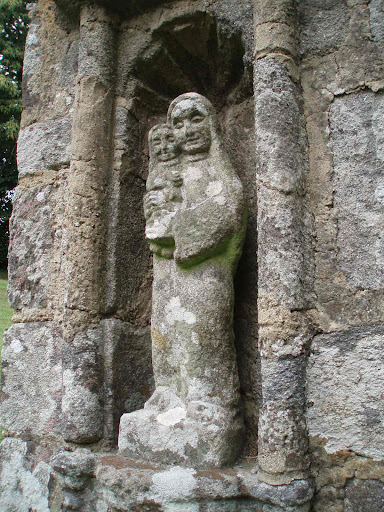
- A statue of the Virgin and child
- Location of La Prénessaye
- Location within France Location within Brittany
- Coordinates: 48°11′02″N 2°37′58″W
- Country: France
- Region: Brittany
- Department: Côtes-d'Armor
- Arrondissement: Saint-Brieuc
- Canton: Loudéac
- Intercommunality: Loudéac Communauté - Bretagne Centre

Government
  - Mayor (2020–2026): Isabelle Corouge
- Area^{1}: 16.97 km^{2} (6.55 sq mi)
- Highest elevation: 203 m (666 ft)
- Lowest elevation: 76 m (249 ft)
- Population (2023): 885
  - Density: 52.2/km^{2} (135/sq mi)
- Time zone: UTC+01:00 (CET)
  - Summer (DST): UTC+02:00 (CEST)
- INSEE/Postal code: 22255 /22210
- ^{1} French Land Register data, which excludes lakes, ponds, glaciers > 1 km^{2} (0.386 sq mi or 247 acres) and river estuaries.

La Prénessaye (Breton: Perenezeg) is a commune in the Côtes-d'Armor department of Brittany in northwestern France.

== Population ==
Historical population
Year	Pop.	±% p.a.
1968	845	—
1975	737	−1.93%
1982	791	+1.02%
1990	854	+0.96%
1999	858	+0.05%
2007	826	−0.47%
2012	859	+0.79%
2017	887	+0.64%
2023	885	−0.04%
Source: INSEE

The inhabitants of La Prénessaye are known in French as prénessayais.

== See also ==
- Communes of the Côtes-d'Armor department
