= Our Lady of Zeitoun =

Marian apparition in Egypt (1968–1971)

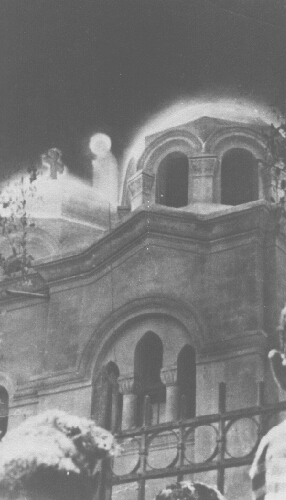
- A photo of the Church of the Virgin Mary with what is believed to be an apparition of the Virgin Mary on the roof
- Location: Zeitoun, Cairo, Egypt
- Date: 2 April 1968
- Type: Marian apparition
- Approval: 4 May 1968, Canonically granted by Pope Kyrillos VI
- Venerated in: Oriental Orthodoxy
- Shrine: Church of the Virgin Mary, Zeitoun, Cairo, Egypt
- Patronage: Egypt
- Attributes: Virgin Mary dressed in white, dove on her head, holding an olive branch while in praying position over a bell tower
- Feast day: 2 April

Our Lady of Zeitoun, also known simply as El-Zeitoun, Zeitun or more rarely Our Lady of Light, was a mass Marian apparition that reportedly occurred in the Zeitoun district of Cairo, Egypt, during a period of about 3 years beginning on 2 April 1968.

== Apparition ==
The first apparition of the Virgin Mary at Zeitoun was recorded on the evening of 2 April 1968. The phenomenon was seen by two Muslim bus mechanics, who claimed to have witnessed a woman dressed in white on the roof of Saint Mary's Coptic Church. One thought she was a nun about to attempt suicide by leaping from the roof, and called for police. Intrigued by the mechanics yelling "don't jump!", a crowd gathered at the site. The police attempted to disperse them, saying that the sighting was just a reflection of the light from the street lamps. However, a church custodian suggested the figure was the Virgin Mary, which greatly excited the crowd. The event itself ended after a few minutes.

One week later, on 9 April, the phenomenon reoccurred, again lasting for only a few minutes. After that time apparitions became more frequent, sometimes two or three times a week, for several years, ending in 1971. According to Coptic tradition, Zeitoun is near one of the locations where the Holy Family stayed during their flight into Egypt.

The patriarch of the Coptic Orthodox Church of Alexandria, Pope Kyrillos VI appointed a committee of high-ranking priests and bishops to investigate the matter, directed by Bishop Gregorios, bishop of postgraduate studies, Coptic culture and scientific research. On 4 May Pope Kyrillos VI issued an official statement confirming the apparitions. Soon afterward, Egypt's Ministry of Tourism also issued a validation of the sightings, and began printing pamphlets, organizing outdoor seating areas, and nominal admission fees for areas closest to the Church.

As the apparition appeared over a Coptic church, the Vatican left the investigation to the Coptic authorities.

The apparitions were also allegedly witnessed by President Gamal Abdel Nasser, and images photographed by newspaper photographers and Egyptian television recordings. Investigations performed by the police could find no apparent explanation. No device was found within a radius of fifteen miles capable of projecting the image, and many photos were taken of the alleged apparition by independent photographers. With no alternative explanation and approval from religious and political officials, the Egyptian government accepted the apparitions as true.

There were also claimed spiritual experiences, conversions, and reporting of healings from curing of blindness, paralysis, cancer, and other terminal illnesses after viewing the apparition. As reported by the Coptic weekly newspaper Watani on 5 May 1968:

One of the priests, echoing the views of many clergy, said that the clarity of the vision differs from person to person. Spiritual depth, purity of heart, and faith all influence the degree to which the apparition is seen: some witnesses see her figure clearly, others perceive only light, while a few see nothing. On one night, twin brothers stood together watching; one saw the Virgin’s full figure, while the other saw only a faint ray of light. It was also noted that children often saw her most vividly, for their innocence and purity make them more receptive to divine visions. Even those who did not see her directly experienced a profound spiritual atmosphere; hymns, prayers, and tears of devotion filled the night. Crowds stood awake until dawn, yet none felt fatigue, returning home at sunrise filled with peace and faith.

== Skeptical response ==
Estimates of the number of observers of the event vary greatly. Thousands were said to have flocked to the Church soon after the first announced occurrences of the phenomenon. Christian author Francis W. Johnston claims the apparitions were seen by a total of millions of people. While primary sources used by Johnston put 250,000 as the upper limit for a single night, though the difficulty in estimating crowd size in the dark means the number of people in the crowd may have been significantly larger or much smaller.

The only secular, and English-language account of the events was provided by Cynthia Nelson, a professor of anthropology at the American University in Cairo. She visited the church site on several occasions over a period of 5 months, including 15 April 1968, another week later near the end of April, and on 1 June 1968. Despite reports of regular appearances of the Virgin Mary, Nelson did not see anything that could be identified clearly as such. Instead she only saw a few "intermittent flashes of light" that she considered to be headlights, and later a glow of ambiguous shape shining through palm trees. "But", she admitted, "the source of the light was a mystery, for the streetlights had been disconnected all around the church for several days." Whenever the slightest light reflections would occur, the crowds would cheer and gasp in awe, with Nelson stating "what the eye sees is the consequence not so much of psychological processes but of intellectual, emotional and ideational concerns."

Cynthia Nelson also documented incense being sold at the marketplace by vendors located at the site of the apparition, as a form of baraka (blessings). She additionally reported that the Muslims were similarly animated, claiming that the Virgin was like them being a Muslim. The Coptic Patriarch Pope Shenouda III was quoted by Nelson in 1972 as saying: "Our revolution has forbidden monopoly, therefore we shall not monopolize the Virgin", so the event would not cause sectarian appeals amongst the Copts and Muslims.

Joe Nickell, an investigator of the paranormal, brought attention to the effects of crowd psychology at Zeitoun, where once word spreads, anticipation for something extraordinary to occur primes large groups of people. Robert Todd Carroll of The Skeptic's Dictionary points out that it was merely assumed to be Mary due to religious background of the devoted, and the lights did not speak or communicate anything directly to anyone. Carroll believes the faithful saw what they already wanted to see, and indicated its location in an impoverished Egyptian town.

They suggest president Nasser co-opted the phenomenon to deflect from civil unrest after the March 30 Manifesto failed to increase Egyptian morale. Sectarian friction within the country was quelled between the Muslims and Christians as a result of the apparition, while the secular manifesto and its reforms issued three days before did not alleviate national widespread grief. Sadiq Jalal Al-Azm in his 1969 publication Critique of Religious Thought, argued that the apparition was actively endorsed and amplified by state institutions to manage the post 1967 Naksa tragedy. He would contend that photographic manipulation and deception by certain newspapers was involved in the supposed fraud. Furthermore, he criticized the Arab socialists, secularists and progressive intellectuals for not instead challenging the phenomenon rationally. Historian Ahmad Shalaby characterized the events as a sanctioned fabrication arising amidst turmoil in political and military leadership. Shalaby asserted at the time he attempted to refute the "falsehoods", but orders forbade any discussion of the matter. He stated rather than producing miraculous healings, the resulting mass gatherings caused injuries and deaths from uncontrolled crowds.

Islamic scholar Muhammad al-Ghazali expressed skepticism regarding the apparition, writing that he and others on the day went to the Church at night and observed nothing. He attributed the widespread reports to media sensationalism and state-backed promotions to boost tourism, alleging the Egyptian authorities suppressed critical reports. Tarek El-Bishry records that in 1969, he went on two nights with his friend and wife, noticing the large and expectant multitudes. They did not see anything except a normal light coming from inside the church building, which was visible through the windows.

Photos of the event are limited, and sometimes inconsistent. Most of the photos are blurry or of poor quality, though some do seem to show the Virgin Mary regardless. Some of them are either superimposed illustrations over a less detailed photo, or a complete illustration, depending on the source of the image. The sourcing for the most popular daytime photo is unclear, and skeptics have mentioned numerous inconsistencies and signs of it being composited, such as the bright sunlight on the onlookers heads, while the sky looks black, or the apparition seeming translucent despite other photographs and witness testimony describing it as opaque and very bright. In Cynthia Nelson's report, she noted that many photos and pictures of the apparition were being sold in the marketplace, which could add a financial incentive for forgery. Contentions have also been raised as to the absence of any videography and recorded 16mm footage during three years of the event.

== Scholarly analysis ==
Donald Westbrook writes that the events of Zeitoun have received little scholarly attention to date, with Musso's 2019 monograph being the first to focus on the apparition.

Otto F A. Meinardus writing shortly after the onset of the events, noted local churches in Shubra and Maadi began making similar reports, and these expanded with the trend spreading to various churches across the Middle East. He discussed a tragedy on May 19, in 1968 where a stampede inside the Archangel Michael Church at Shubra resulted in 15 people being trampled to death.

Valeria Céspedes Musso considered the sightings in their cultural context. The appearances happened during a period of crisis in Egyptian history and echoed "a widespread feeling that the defeat of Egypt in the 1967 Arab-Israeli war was the result of having abandoned faith in favour of human-made ideas and belief systems". Musso also records a survey by John P. Jackson in 1986, which interviewed 111 Egyptian Christian persons present at the time. The experience of the surveyed interviewees was mixed in the manner they experienced seeing the apparition, but with 90% of 83 respondents reporting it looked "human with a definite shape".

Robert Bartholomew and Erich Goode offer the Zeitoun apparitions as a case of mass hysteria: "It appears that the Marian observers were predisposed by religious background and social expectation to interpreting the light displays as related to the Virgin Mary." Michael P. Carroll suggests that the "lights of uncertain origin" were interpreted as Mary due to stresses on Egyptian society and an association of the Virgin Mary with the Zeitoun area. Carroll notes that Muslims seeing the Virgin would not be unusual, as Mary is highly revered in Islam as well.

John S. Derr and Michael A. Persinger proposed a possible cause of the lights themselves in Tectonic Strain Theory, the idea that the occurrence of earthquakes causes the appearance of strange lights. Zeitoun did see tectonic activity prior to the events of 1968–1971; therefore, the source of the lights could have been a product of this seismic activity. Derr and Persinger of the US Geological Survey originally presented experimental evidence for mechanisms using the 1962 through 1967 Derby Colorado earthquakes that created luminous phenomena. Appearances of the lights only at night would be possible as such lights might not be visible during daytime; however, Tectonic Strain Theory has yet to provide a mechanism for how tectonic events could cause these lights.

Travis Dumsday, a professor of philosophy of religion, argues against conventional explanations for the apparitions at Zeitoun. His thesis posits that the Marian apparitions at Zeitoun "constitute powerful evidence for the reality of the supernatural"; however, he does not claim that an adequate scientific explanation will never be found, nor that the purported events constitute decisive proof of the paranormal. Rather, he maintains that they provide an evidential basis for such a proposition. Biblical scholar Dale Allison, while ascribing the lights to an unknown phenomenon rather than Mary, finds no satisfying skeptical explanation for the events surrounding Zeitoun. Elaborating that no natural light phenomena closely resembles the apparition, and the lack of evidence for a hoax given that power to the area at one point was cut off by authorities.

== Golden Jubilee ==
On 12 May 2018, the Coptic Church celebrated the golden jubilee of the event, where a large number of priests and Christians from all over Egypt attended the celebration. Sub-celebrations of the occurrence have also been held from 10 May to 13 May. At the anniversary during a Divine Liturgy, Bishop Bishoy stated the Virgin Mary did not appear to any other Christian denominations, but only to their "true church", because it is the right one.

== Theatrical release ==
In 2012, the film The Virgin, the Copts and Me by director Namir Abdel Messeeh, has a section where he includes recollections of various apparitions in Egypt, including that of Our Lady of Zeitoun.

== See also ==
- Church of the Virgin Mary (Zeitoun)
- Coptic Orthodox Church
- Our Lady of Assiut
- Our Lady of Fatima
- Our Lady of Guadalupe
- Our Lady of Lourdes
- Our Lady of Warraq
