= Military history of New Zealand during World War I =

New Zealand Expeditionary Force
- Active: 1914–1918
- Country: New Zealand
- Branch: New Zealand Army
- Role: Expeditionary warfare
- Size: 100,471 men
- Nickname: NZEF
- Engagements: World War I: Sinai and Palestine Campaign; Senussi Campaign; Gallipoli Campaign; Western Front

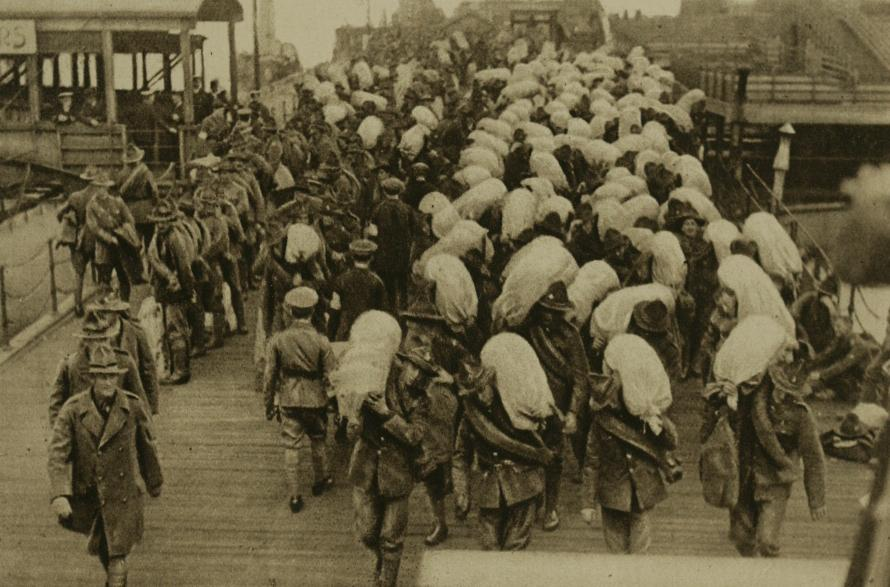
New Zealand troops unloading at a French port in 1918.

The military history of New Zealand during World War I began in August 1914. When Britain declared war on Germany at the start of the First World War, the New Zealand Government followed without hesitation, despite its geographic isolation and small population. It was believed at the time that any declaration of war by the United Kingdom automatically included New Zealand; and the Governor (the Earl of Liverpool) announced that New Zealand was at war with Germany from the steps of Parliament on 5 August.

The total number of New Zealander troops and nurses to serve overseas in 1914–18, excluding those in British and other Dominion forces, was 100,471, from a population of just over a million. Forty-two percent of men of military age served in the New Zealand Expeditionary Force, fighting in the Gallipoli campaign and on the Western Front. 16,697 New Zealanders were killed and 41,317 were wounded during the war – a 58 percent casualty rate. Approximately a further thousand men died within five years of the war's end, as a result of injuries sustained, and 507 died while training in New Zealand between 1914 and 1918.

The First World War saw Māori soldiers serve for the first time in a major conflict with the New Zealand Army (although a number had fought in the Second Boer War when New Zealand recruiters chose to ignore British military policy of the time of disallowing 'native' soldiers). A contingent took part in the Gallipoli campaign, and later served with distinction on the Western Front as part of the New Zealand (Māori) Pioneer Battalion. 2,227 Māori and 500 Pasifika, including 150 Niueans, served with New Zealand forces in total.

== Outbreak of the war ==
On 30 July 1914, the British Admiralty informed Captain Herbert Marshall, the senior naval officer in New Zealand, by telegram that a war in Europe was likely. This followed the declaration of war made by Austria-Hungary against Serbia, the news of which threatened to bring Russia, and her allies, Britain and France, into the conflict. A War Council, which included Marshall, Prime Minister William Massey, and Major General Alexander Godley, the commandant of the New Zealand Military Forces, was formed. This authorised the commencement of certain mobilisation and defensive procedures. These included implementing inspections of incoming vessels at the four major ports, mobilisation of the garrison artillery to man the various forts around the country, and commencement of censorship. Radio stations and the sites where undersea telegraph cables came on shore were placed under guard. The cruiser HMS Philomel, on a training voyage in the Cook Strait was recalled and made ready for war, such as it could be given its rundown state. The country's small Royal Naval Reserve was called up on 2 August to help crew the cruiser.

The conflict in Europe escalated in the following days when Germany declared war on Russia and then on 4 August invaded Belgium. This brought France and Britain into the war in support of Belgium. The outbreak of World War I was announced in the afternoon of 5 August by the Governor of New Zealand, Lord Liverpool, when he read out aloud the telegram dispatched by the Colonial Office confirming the commencement of hostilities to a crowd of 15,000 people gathered outside the old Parliament Building in Wellington. Although a self-governing Dominion, such were New Zealand's ties to Great Britain as part of the British Empire it was inherently understood that the country was automatically at war as well. Massey, speaking to the crowd after Lord Liverpool's proclamation of war, urged his fellow citizens to "keep cool, stand fast, do your duty to your country and your Empire".

There was bi-partisan support in Parliament for its position in standing alongside Great Britain and its Dominions; both Massey's Reform government and its Liberal opposition made strong expressions of support. The leader of the Liberal Party, Joseph Ward, made it clear that the British Empire could not be uninvolved in any fighting against the Central Powers. The general population, at least 20% of whom were born in Great Britain, also demonstrated keen patriotism and an appreciation that New Zealand needed to play a role in the ensuing conflict. As the news of the war spread, crowds gathered at central points in major cities and marched and cheered in support of Britain and her allies. However, the indigenous people of New Zealand, the Māori, had a more muted reaction; not having the same links to Great Britain, they were only a small proportion of the population and were not a part of mainstream society.

Prior to the official declaration of war, the New Zealand government had offered, on 31 July, to provide an expeditionary force to the British government; this followed a similar offer made by Canada. Initially advised that this would not be required, New Zealand's offer was subsequently accepted on 7 August.

The first New Zealander to be killed while on military deployment in World War I was John 'Rosy' Reardon, from Kaikoura. Reardon was a 23 year-old sailor of the newly-formed Royal Australian Navy, and was aboard the submarine HMAS AE1 when it sank on 14 September 1914.

== Samoa ==
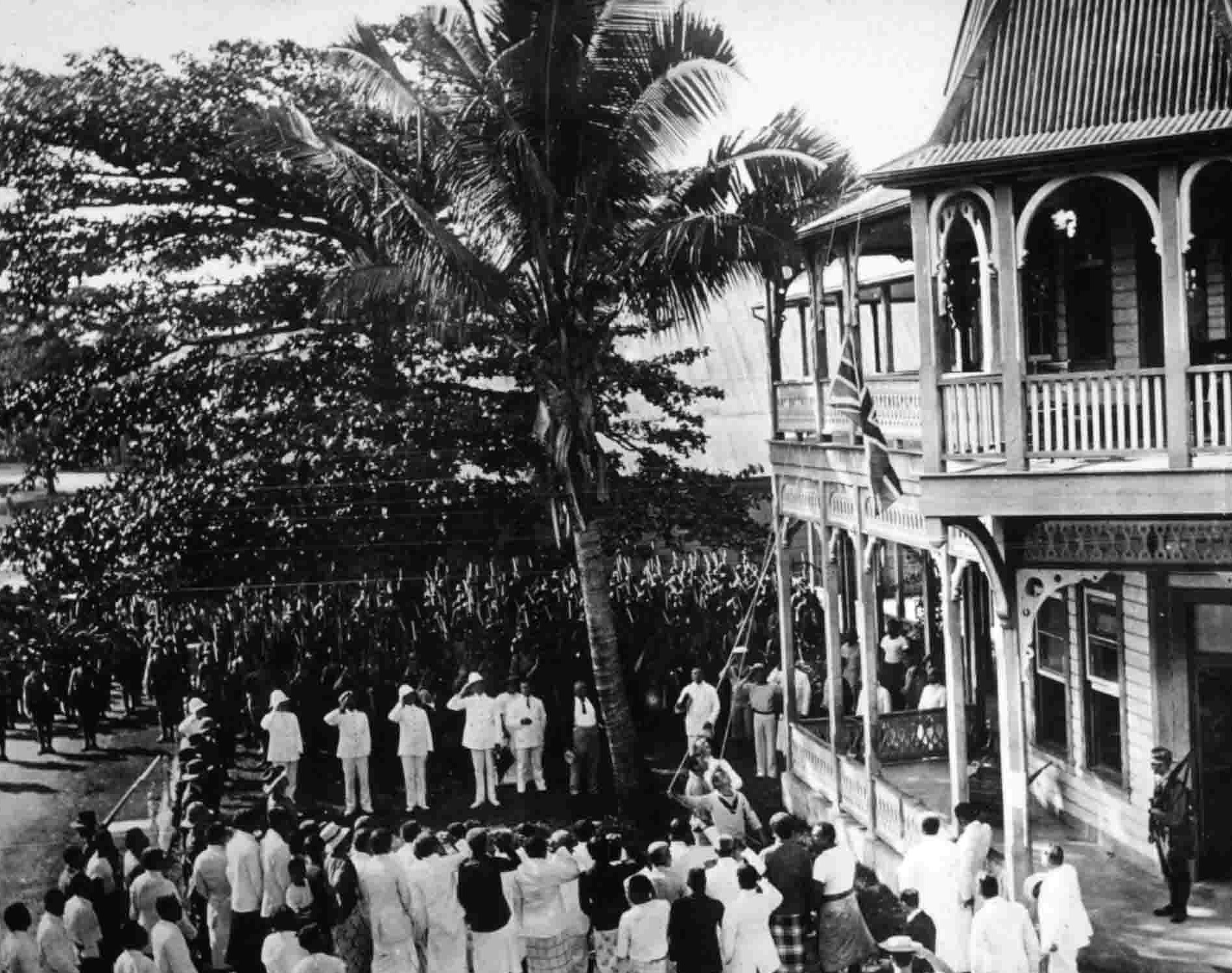
The Union Flag being raised at the courthouse at Apia on 30 August 1914

On 6 August 1914, the British government requested New Zealand seize the wireless station on the island of Upolu, part of Imperial Germany's protectorate of German Samoa, deeming it "a great and urgent Imperial service." Therefore, a body of personnel was organised for service in Samoa. A mixed force of 1,374 men, mostly drawn from the Territorial Force and known as the Samoan Expeditionary Force (SEF) under the command of Colonel Robert Logan, plus six nursing sisters, sailed from New Zealand on 15 August.

The transport ships were escorted by the cruisers HMS Psyche and HMS Philomel. To help allay concerns about the possibility of being intercepted by the German East Asiatic Squadron, the convoy was joined by HMAS Australia and the French cruiser Montcalm at Noumea. After stopping in Fiji to collect some guides and interpreters, the New Zealanders arrived at Apia on 29 August.

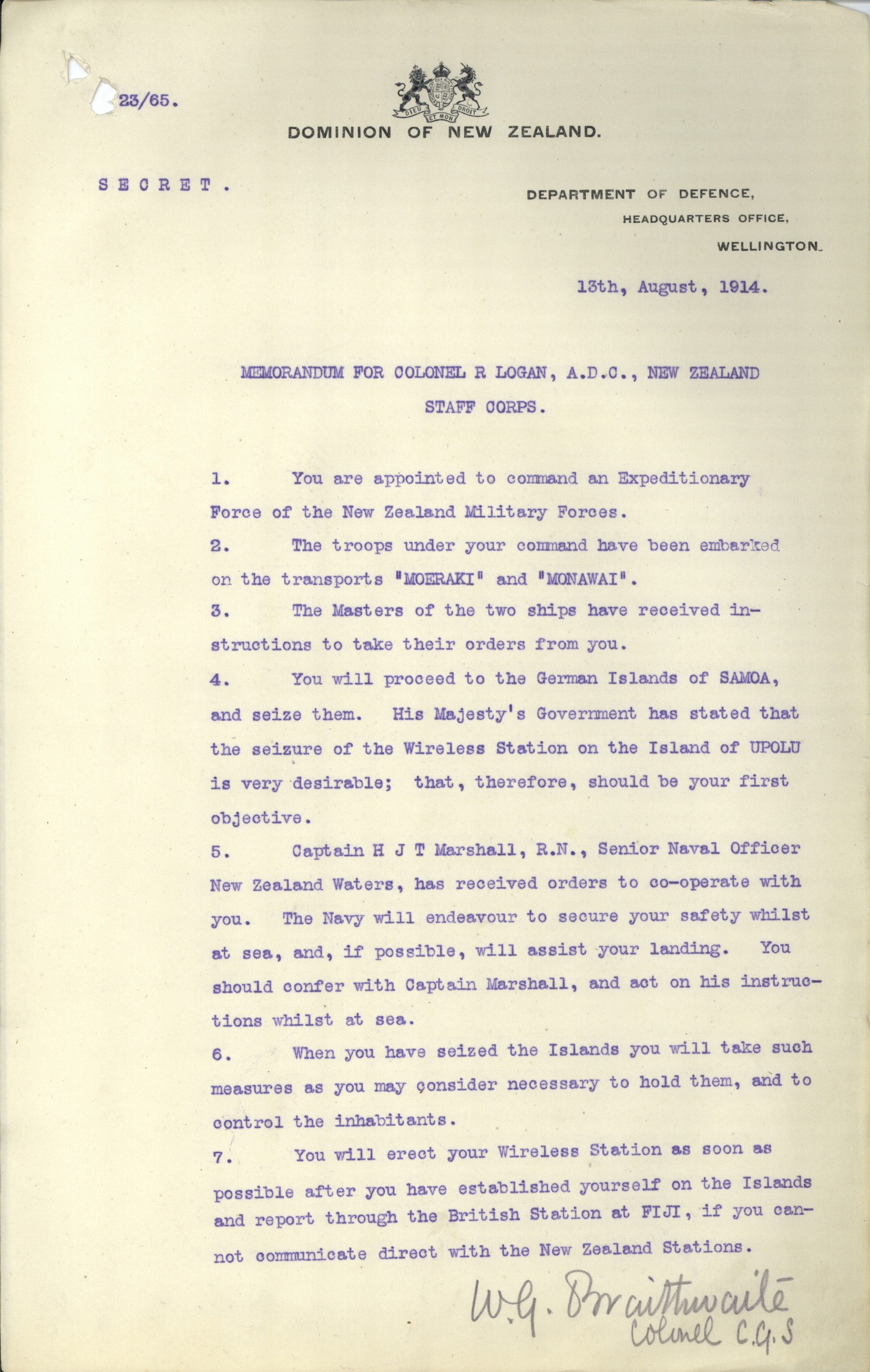
Orders received by Lieutenant-Colonel Robert Logan from Colonel Braithwaite to seize German Samoa, 18 August 1914

Germany refused to officially surrender the islands but with only a minimal military presence, there was little prospect for meaningful resistance. The Governor of German Samoa, Erich Schultz, sent a message from the island's radio station that no resistance would be offered. The New Zealanders proceeded to land at Apia and seized key buildings and facilities without interference. The only opposition encountered was at the radio station, where the equipment was sabotaged by the German operators. Logan officially declared German Samoa to be under the control of New Zealand the following day, 30 August, in a ceremony at the courthouse in Apia.

When Vizeadmiral (Vice Admiral) Maximilian von Spee, commander of the East Asiatic Squadron, learned of the occupation, he hastened to Samoa with the armoured cruisers SMS Scharnhorst and SMS Gneisenau. Arriving at Apia on 14 September, the approach of the German ships was observed and the New Zealanders prepared to defend themselves. However, von Spee and his ships soon departed for Tahiti, with neither side opening fire. The SEF remained in Samoa until March 1915 at which time it began returning to New Zealand, a process completed by the following month.

== New Zealand Expeditionary Force ==
It had been envisaged for a number of years that New Zealand would contribute an expeditionary force to serve in any conflict involving the British Empire and plans for raising it had been in place for some time. In the years prior to the outbreak of the war, Godley coordinated plans with his counterpart in Australia for the purpose of making a joint contribution to an expeditionary force. The most likely use of this expeditionary force was envisaged to be in Europe against Germany, which Godley assessed as being the most likely opponent in any hostilities.

Once the declaration of war was made, Massey officially offered what would be known as the New Zealand Expeditionary Force (NZEF) to the British government, which accepted on 12 August. To form the basis of the NZEF, Massey had wanted to call up men of the Territorial Force but was advised that this was only possible for active service in New Zealand. In any event, it proved unnecessary as men of the Territorial Force came forward on a voluntary basis in large numbers and furthermore, the public response to the call for volunteers for the NZEF was immediate and enthusiastic. By 12 August, around 14,000 men had come forward; Massey had hoped for around 7,000 to 8,000.

Mobilisation for the NZEF actually commenced before the war for, on 31 July 1914, the four military districts started tentative and discrete preparations, anticipating a formal declaration of war. Volunteers had to be of at least 20 years of age and pass a strict medical examination. This meant that many soldiers of the Territorial Force were excluded on account of either their age or their health. Mobilisation plans called for each infantry battalion of the Territorial Force to provide a company for the NZEF while the various mounted infantry regiments would provide a squadron. This would result in an infantry brigade of four battalions and a mounted rifles brigade with three regiments. There would be a surplus regiment of mounted rifle regiment and also supporting units of artillery, engineers and field ambulances.

Volunteers who passed their medical examination proceeded to mobilisation camps established in Auckland, Palmerston North, Christchurch and Dunedin, for training. Those not already in the Territorial Force were fitted out with kit and equipment. The raising of the NZEF proceeded so satisfactorily that Massey was able to advise the British government that it could leave New Zealand by 27 August although more time would be preferable. Ultimately, the main body of the NZEF, under the command of Godley, (Note: In Godley's absence from New Zealand, command of the New Zealand Military Forces was given to Brigadier General Alfred Robin.) departed New Zealand on 16 October after an earlier attempt to leave was abandoned following the assessment of the risk of interception by the German East Asiatic Squadron. When it left, the main body numbered 8,574 men, spread across ten troopships, as well as over 3,800 horses, ten million rounds of ammunition and 6,000 rounds of artillery shells.

== Middle East ==
Following its departure from Wellington, the convoy transporting the NZEF steamed to Western Australia where it linked up with the troopships carrying the Australian Imperial Force (AIF). There was still concerns regarding the vulnerability of the troop transports to attack by the German East Asia Squadron so the convoy included an escort of three cruisers, HMS Minotaur (1906), HMS Philomel (1890), and HMAS Psyche, as well as the Japanese battlecruiser Ibuki. Together with their escorting warships, the convoy, now numbering 37 transports, sailed to Alexandria via Colombo and the Suez Canal. During the voyage, they were fortunate to have avoided SMS Emden which was near the Cocos Islands at the same time the convoy was transiting the area. (Note: The Emden, a cruiser detached from the German East Asia Squadron, was tasked with raiding shipping in the Indian Ocean. On 9 November, it was sunk by HNAS Sydney. Although the encounter occurred out of sight of the convoy, some reported hearing the sounds of the engagement.) It had been intended that the NZEF and AIF would be landed in Europe. However, following the entry of the Ottoman Empire into World War I on the side of the Central Powers, there was now a security threat to the Suez Canal. The New Zealanders and Australians were instead disembarked in Egypt to defend the Suez Canal against an attack.

In December, the Australian and New Zealand Army Corps (ANZAC), under Lieutenant General William Birdwood, was formed to command both the AIF and NZEF components. (Note: The first use of the acronym ANZAC was by a clerk in its headquarters who made a stamp bearing these initials for the purpose of marking incoming mail.) The AIF was able to field one complete Australian division, the 1st Division, and had a surplus of one each of mounted and infantry brigades. To form the second infantry division of the corps, Birdwood included the Australian brigades with the respective mounted and infantry brigades of the NZEF. This division was to be known as the New Zealand and Australian Division (NZ&A), with Godley as its commander. The headquarters staff for this formation amounted to 70 officers and 550 men. These were mostly provided by the British and it was formally part of the British Army. It was however lacking artillery, with only a single New Zealand artillery brigade available, as opposed to the conventional three that would be provided to an infantry division.

A camp for the NZEF was established at Zeitoun, close to Cairo. While the NZ&A was forming and training in Egypt, elements were committed to the defence of the Suez Canal. On 26 January 1915, the four infantry battalions of the New Zealand Infantry Brigade—the Auckland, Canterbury, Wellington, and Otago Battalions—and a supporting field ambulance were deployed in anticipation of an attack on the canal by Ottoman forces. This force was split between Ismailia and Kubri. On 2 February, after the Ottomans launched a raid on the Suez Canal, elements of the brigade took part in repelling the attack, with the Canterbury Battalion suffering the division's first losses in battle, with two men being wounded, one of whom later died. The first man to die in action on deployment with the NZEF was Private William Arthur Ham, who was killed when a bullet ricocheted off his rifle and struck him in the neck on 5 February 1915.

== Gallipoli ==
=== Background ===
By the end of 1914, the fighting on the Western Front had reached a stalemate, the opposing forces having dug in along a network of trenches extending between Belgium and Switzerland. Attention began to focus on opening other fronts to help break the deadlock. Winston Churchill, in his capacity as First Lord of the Admiralty, put forward plans for a naval attack on the Dardanelles. Initially rejected on the basis of being too risky, a plan for an attack on the Gallipoli peninsula was eventually approved by the War Council in January 1915. Destroying the forts that guarded the entrance to the Dardanelles would open the Black Sea's only entrance to the Mediterranean, via the Dardanelles and Bosphorus straits, to allow shipping to Russia, fighting on the Eastern Front on the side of the Allies, all year round. The Royal Navy attacked the following month but progress against the Turkish defences was slow and on 18 March, a number of vessels were sunk by mines.

Consideration then turned to the possibility of making landings by Allied troops to take high ground on the portion of the Gallipoli peninsula that overlooked the Narrows, the narrowest point of the Dardanelles, and eliminate mobile artillery that guarded minefields strewn through the straits at this point. It was decided that the ANZAC Corps would take part in the operation, alongside British, Indian and French contingents. This combination of Allied forces was known as the Mediterranean Expeditionary Force (MEF) and placed under the command of General Sir Ian Hamilton. His plans called for his forces, which totalled around 75,000 men, to be landed at Cape Helles, on the southern part of the Gallipoli peninsula with the ANZACs being landed north of Gaba Tepe on the Aegean coast from where they could advance across the peninsula and prevent retreat from or reinforcement of Turkish forst further south. The French were to land at Kum Kale to prevent Turkish artillery firing on Cape Helles.

=== Landing at Anzac Cove ===
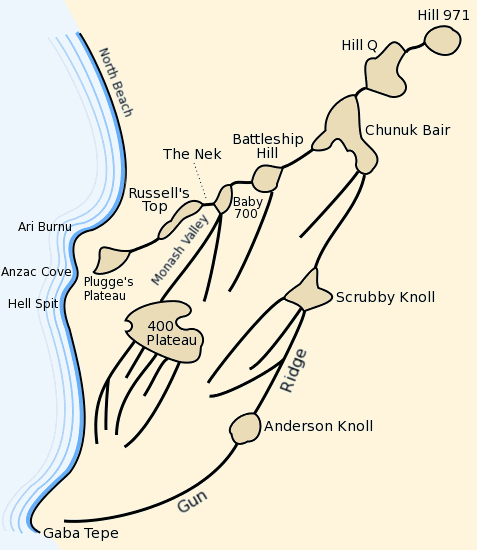
Ridges and plateaus at Anzac Cove

The spearhead of the ANZAC Corps assault force, the 3rd Brigade of the 1st Division, began to go ashore shortly before dawn on 25 April. The intended landing zone, 'Z' beach, was about a mile north of Gaba Tepe and overlooked by a low rise beyond which lay the Maidos Plain. However, the landing went awry and the boats containing the first wave were concentrated about a mile and a half further north than intended in a shallow, nameless cove with a 800-metre strip of beach running between Ari Burnu to the north and Hell Spit to the south. Here the beach, which became known as Anzac Cove, was overlooked by a warren of ridges and gullies which offered the few Turkish defenders an ideal defensive position.

New Zealand troops landing at Gallipoli

The landing was only lightly opposed by scattered Turkish units until Mustafa Kemal, commanding the 19th Division and perceiving the threat posed by the landings, rushed reinforcements to the area in what became a race for the high ground. It was intended that the NZ&A would be held in reserve once they landed in anticipation of being released to march across the Maidos Plain. The lead elements of the NZ&A, the New Zealand Infantry Brigade, began landing mid-morning, the first unit being the Auckland Infantry Battalion, but quickly became mixed up with the Australian troops already on the shore. The Aucklanders and Canterbury Infantry Battalion were then sent as reinforcements to a knoll called Baby 700, where Australians of the 1st Division were heavily engaged with the Turks. The latter eventually took final possession of the feature. Once the Anzac advance inland was checked, the Turks counter-attacked, trying to force the invaders back to the shore, but failed to dislodge them from the foothold they had gained at Anzac Cove.

Of the 3,100 New Zealanders that landed at Anzac Cove on 25 April, around 600 to 700 became casualties. By nightfall, the situation at Anzac Cove was perilous for the Australians and New Zealanders. Birdwood recommended that they be evacuated but was rebuffed by Hamilton, who insisted they dig in. The Royal Navy also advised of the impossibility of re-embarking the ANZAC Corps. As more units of the NZ&A arrived on the beach they were dispatched to consolidate the defences. Ultimately the NZ&A were tasked with defending the northern sector of Anzac Cove while the Australian 1st Division had the southern sector. The landings elsewhere fared little better and although the French did land at Kum Kale, they were later embarked and transferred to Cape Helles.

=== Krithia ===
In early May, Hamilton decided to focus the MEF's efforts on the Helles sector, which he believed represented its best chance of success for gaining the heights of Achi Baba. Birdwood withdrew the New Zealand Infantry Brigade and the Australian 2nd Infantry Brigade and they moved by sea to Cape Helles on 6 May as reinforcements for an attack on the village of Krithia, on the slopes of Achi Baba. An attempt earlier in the month made by British and French units had failed. During the subsequent Second Battle of Krithia on 8 May, the New Zealanders suffered 835 casualties in an ill-advised and unsupported daylight advance over open ground that Lieutenant Colonel William Malone, the commander of the Wellington Infantry Battalion, later believed could have been occupied after dark with minimal losses. The attackers managed to advance 200 to 300 metres before going to ground. Later in the day, they attempted to resume the advance but without success. The Australian brigade mounted a similarly unsuccessful attack.

=== Turkish counter-attack ===
The perimeter of Anzac Cove, heavily overlooked by the Turkish positions, was effectively besieged. Turkish snipers made providing supplies to the front lines dangerous. Munitions were limited and the Anzacs had to make their own grenades from empty tins. On 19 May, the Turks mounted an assault against the perimeter at Anzac Cove. By this time, the New Zealand and 2nd Infantry Brigades had returned from Cape Helles and additionally, the position had been reinforced by the arrival of the New Zealand Mounted Rifles Brigade and 1st Light Horse Brigade, both without their horses, from Egypt. Stout defence saw the Turks take heavy casualties and the bodies of the attacking soldiers littered no-man's land. Godley ordered a counter-attack but Lieutenant Colonel Andrew Russell, the commander of the New Zealand Mounted Rifles Brigade, recognised the futility of this action and persuaded his commander to call it off.

=== August offensive ===
The frontline in the northern sector of Anzac Cove, mainly consisting of a series of outposts, was much less defined than in the south. For this reason Birdwood considered the area as having good potential for outflanking the Turkish positions and initiating a breakout out of Anzac Cove. Planning began in mid-May for an offensive to commence in August. In a nighttime advance, he aimed to capture key points on the Sari Bair range: Chunuk Bair, Hill Q, and Hill 971. From there his forces would take Battleship Hill and Baby 700. Hamilton approved of Birdwood's plan and sought reinforcements for the operation. These would be used for landings at Suvla Bay, 10 kilometres (6.2 mi) north of Anzac Cove. This would potentially draw Turkish forces away from Birdwood's men. As further distractions, attacks would be made at Lone Pine and at Cape Helles.

Birdwood's attack, to commence on 6 August, was a complicated affair, with a number of different units advancing on different fronts and at specified times. Many of the soldiers involved were fatigued and unwell, and would need to traverse steep terrain, in the dark, while on a tight schedule. It began with the Australian 1st Brigade attacking Lone Pine in the early evening, which was successful in drawing in Turkish reserves. However, it transpired that these would be better able to move to the Sari Bair range. After dark, the New Zealand Mounted Rifles Brigade and the Otago Mounted Rifles began their advance to secure the foothills in front of the Sari Bair range. This was achieved by 1:00 am on 7 August.

The force tasked with taking the summit of Chunuk Bair was the New Zealand Infantry Brigade, commanded by Colonel Francis Johnston along with an Indian mountain battery. However, the troops took time to move forward, and were delayed by having to escort captured Turkish soldiers down to the beach. Johnston then inexplicably waited for all of his force to arrive at the rendezvous point before attacking Chunuk Bair, contrary to Birdwood's instructions to advance irrespective of any delays.

=== Evacuation ===
The Allied forces at Anzac Cove were eventually evacuated in December 1915, with Cape Helles being abandoned in early January 1916. The significance of the Gallipoli Campaign was strongly felt in New Zealand, and Australia, where it was the first great conflict experienced by the fledgling nation. Before Gallipoli the citizens of New Zealand were confident of the superiority of the British Empire and were proud and eager to offer their service. The campaign in Gallipoli shook that confidence.

Today, the date of the initial landings, 25 April, is a public holiday known as ANZAC Day in New Zealand and every year thousands of people gather at memorials around the country, and indeed in Turkey, to honour the bravery and sacrifice of the original Anzacs, and of all those who have subsequently lost their lives in war.

New Zealand casualties during the Gallipoli campaign amounted to 2,721 dead and 4,852 wounded. It had long been believed that 8,556 men of the NZEF served at Gallipoli, due to Sir Ian Hamilton reciting this figure in his introduction to Fred Waite's The New Zealanders at Gallipoli, part of the Official History of New Zealand's Effort in the Great War. However, recent research indicates that at least 16,000, possibly more than 17,000, NZEF soldiers served at Gallipoli.

== Egypt and Palestine ==
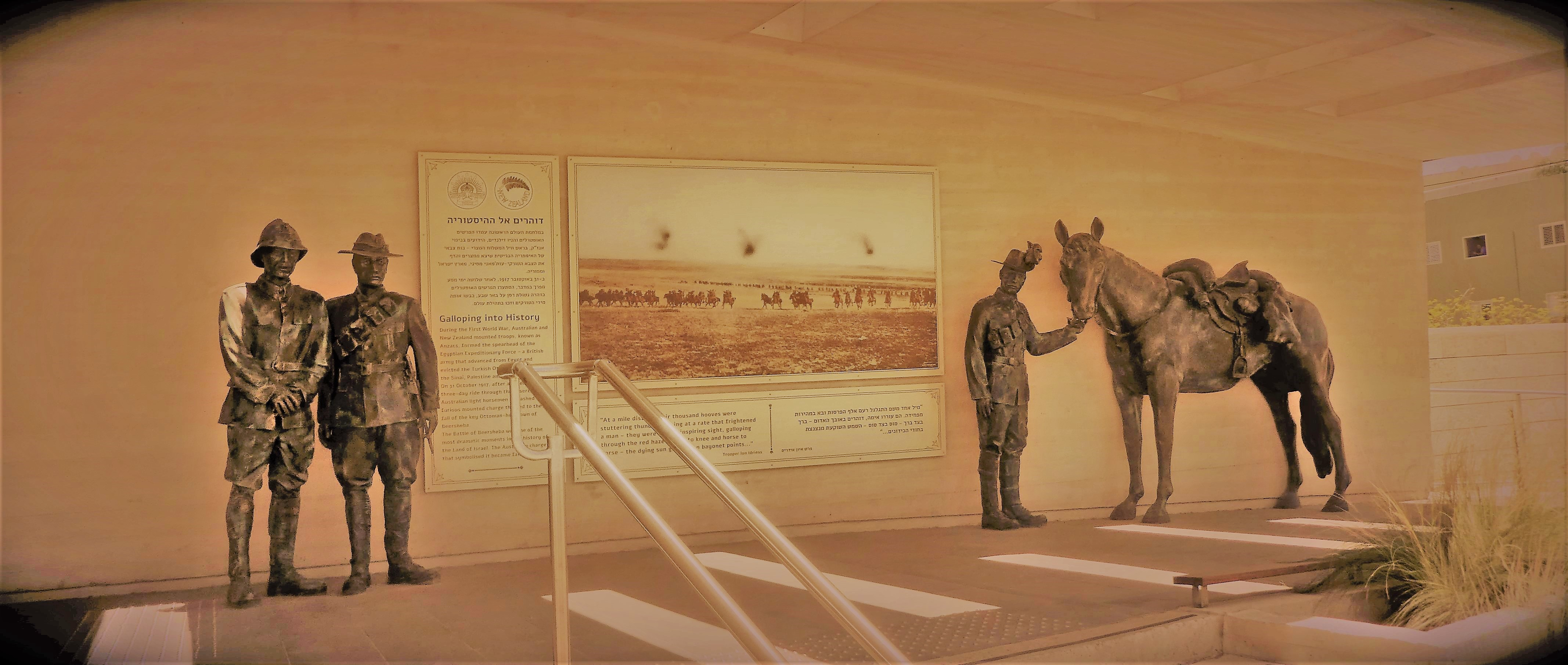
The Be'er Sheva Anzac Memorial Centre in Israel

=== Reorganisation in Egypt ===
In Egypt, the NZEF was reorganised into the New Zealand Mounted Brigade and the New Zealand Division (infantry). Reinforcements from New Zealand replaced the Australian component of the division, which embarked for France in April 1916.

=== Fighting the Senussi Arabs ===
The New Zealand Rifle Brigade (less two battalions) had meanwhile reached Egypt in November 1915 and was sent into the Egyptian desert to help defeat a Senussi invasion from Libya. The 1st Battalion fought two brisk but inexpensive actions south-west of Matruh as part of a mixed force (including British, Australians, and Indians), one on Christmas Day, the other on 23 January 1916. Both were successful and broke the back of the invasion. In mid-February the 1st Battalion rejoined the rest of the brigade at Moascar in the Suez Canal area.

=== Sinai and Palestine campaign ===
The New Zealand Mounted Brigade, 147 officers and 2,897 other ranks, remained in Egypt as part of the Anzac Mounted Division. In April 1916, it was deployed to the Sinai Peninsula where it took part in the ultimately successful Sinai and Palestine Campaign against the Turks. New Zealanders fought in most of the battles leading up to the fall of Jerusalem and the defeat of the Ottoman Army, and were praised for their fighting alongside their Australian and British comrades. In 1919, Field Marshal Sir Edmund Allenby, said this of the New Zealand soldiers in the Sinai campaign;

"Nothing daunted these intrepid fighters: to them nothing was impossible."

A total of 17,723 New Zealanders served in this campaign and New Zealand casualties were 640 killed in action and 1,146 wounded.

== Western Front ==
=== Transfer to Europe ===
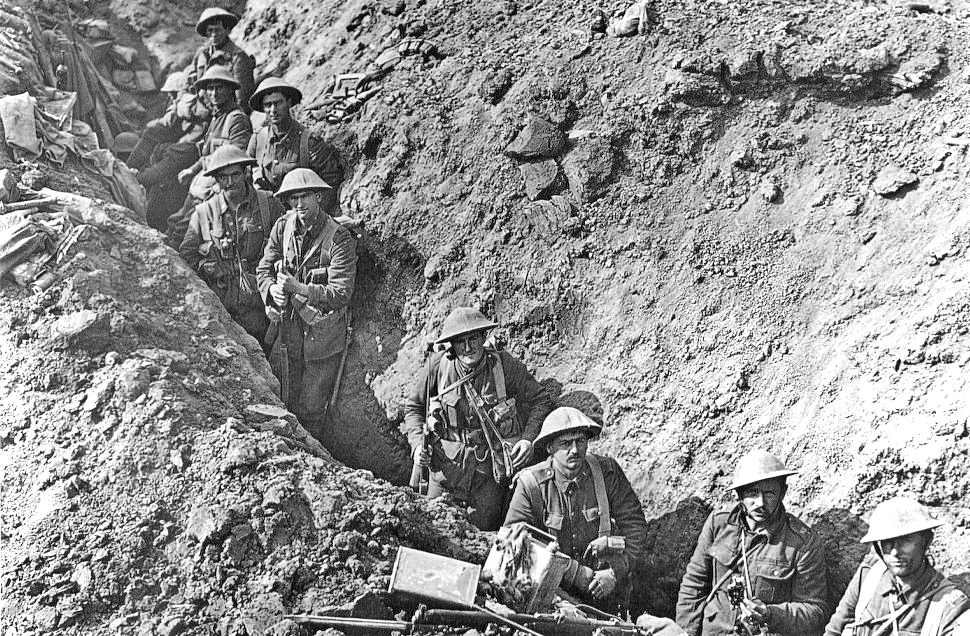
Infantry from the 2nd Battalion, Auckland Regiment, New Zealand Division in the Switch Line near Flers, taken some time in September 1916, after the Battle of Flers-Courcelette

In April 1916, the New Zealand Division was transferred from Egypt to Europe for service on the Western Front. Arriving in France, it settled in on the stalemated Western Front as part of I ANZAC Corps, initially based in the Armentières sector where they would undergo intensive training in trench warfare. The Armentières front line was regarded by the Allies as a nursery sector where new units could undergo familiarisation without being called upon for intensive offensive operations. In late June, the division was transferred to II ANZAC Corps, which was commanded by Godley. For the next two months, it was involved in subsidiary operations intended to tie down German troops during the early stages of the Somme offensive.

With the bulk of the NZEF now based in France, facilities were set up in England for its troops. Reinforcements from New Zealand, along with soldiers having recovered from sickness or wounds, were sent to Sling Camp, an annexe of Bulford Camp in Wiltshire, and the largest of the NZEF camps in England. Here they would receive further training before being dispatched to the Western Front.

=== Battle of the Somme, 1916 ===
Relieved in mid-August, the New Zealand Division was rested in Abbeville, having incurred 2,500 casualties, including 400 killed. Returning to the front lines, it took part in the Fourth Army's attack on 15 September, under the command of the British XV Corps.

By the time they were relieved on 4 October, the New Zealanders had advanced three kilometres and captured eight kilometres of enemy front line. 7,048 had become casualties, of whom 1,560 were killed.

=== Battle of Messines ===
In June 1917, the New Zealand Division further distinguished itself in the storming of Messines Ridge and the capture of the village of Messines. On 7 June, after the detonation of nearly 500 tons of explosives in huge mines on both sides of the New Zealand sector, the 2nd and 3rd Brigades scrambled over the top, in and out of shell holes, and up the battered slopes. Carrying the German front line and supports, they were soon into the ruined village. The 1st Brigade passed through, helped on the left by a solitary tank, to the final objective. With prisoners and booty including many guns it was a striking success at no great cost; but the German artillery revived and by the time the division was relieved on 9 and 10 June it had lost 3,700 men, evenly distributed between the three brigades.

=== Battle of Passchendaele ===
The New Zealand Division's next major engagement was at Passchendaele in October 1917. The division had been training since the end of August to overcome the numerous concrete pillboxes in this sector. The first objective was the Gravenstafel Spur, attacked before dawn on 4 October, as part of a major advance. The 1st and 4th Brigades forestalled a heavy German counter-attack, and the supporting artillery barrage inflicted frightful slaughter on the waiting Germans. Crossing this scene of carnage, the 1st and 4th Brigades gained their objectives after a hard fight, inflicting exceptionally heavy loss on the enemy and capturing much equipment. For such a resounding success the 1,700 New Zealand casualties, though a sad loss, did not in current terms seem excessive. But heavy rain turned the countryside into a bog and tragedy lay ahead.

A British attack on the ninth on Bellevue Spur and part of the main Passchendaele ridge gained a little ground at prohibitive cost. Heavy swathes of barbed wire still girdled the hillside, however, and belated and meagre heavy artillery made no impression on them, nor on the many pillboxes beyond. New Zealand gunners slaved to breaking point to get only a few guns and howitzers forward, but stable platforms and accurate fire were unattainable.

The division returned to the attack on 12 October, with the 2nd and 3rd Brigades. There was little to encourage the men as they waited overnight in a morass under steady rain. Shelled in their assembly area, some were shelled again by their own guns when the thin barrage opened at 5.25 a.m., and then they led off into a deluge of small-arms fire, speckled with geyser-like eruptions as shells exploded in the mud. Worst of all was the wire, covered with deadly fire, its few gaps deliberate deathtraps. Some men tried to crawl under it, some threw themselves at it, two got right through and were killed in the act of hurling grenades at the loopholes of the nearest pillbox. The left gained 500 yards of slippery slope, the centre 200 heartbreaking yards, the right nothing until the 80-odd occupants of two blockhouses and a trench used up all their ammunition. Then they were captured, blockhouses and all, by two brave and skillful men, sole survivors of two Otago platoons.

For these small gains, the New Zealanders suffered 640 dead and 2,100 wounded. For the first time the division had failed in a major operation. After this failure, the division continued to hold a sector of the line. The steady drain of men while units only held the line was less spectacular, though it made up half the losses of the division. Here, before withdrawing from the front, 400 more men were lost in the 4th Brigade alone.

The division now had four brigades, making it one of the largest on the Western Front, and was stationed in the Polygon Wood area. An attack by the 2nd Brigade on 3 December 1917 gained useful ground but failed to capture Polderhoek Chateau. When the division was relieved, on 24 February 1918, three "quiet" months had cost 3,000 men, more than 1,873 of them killed.

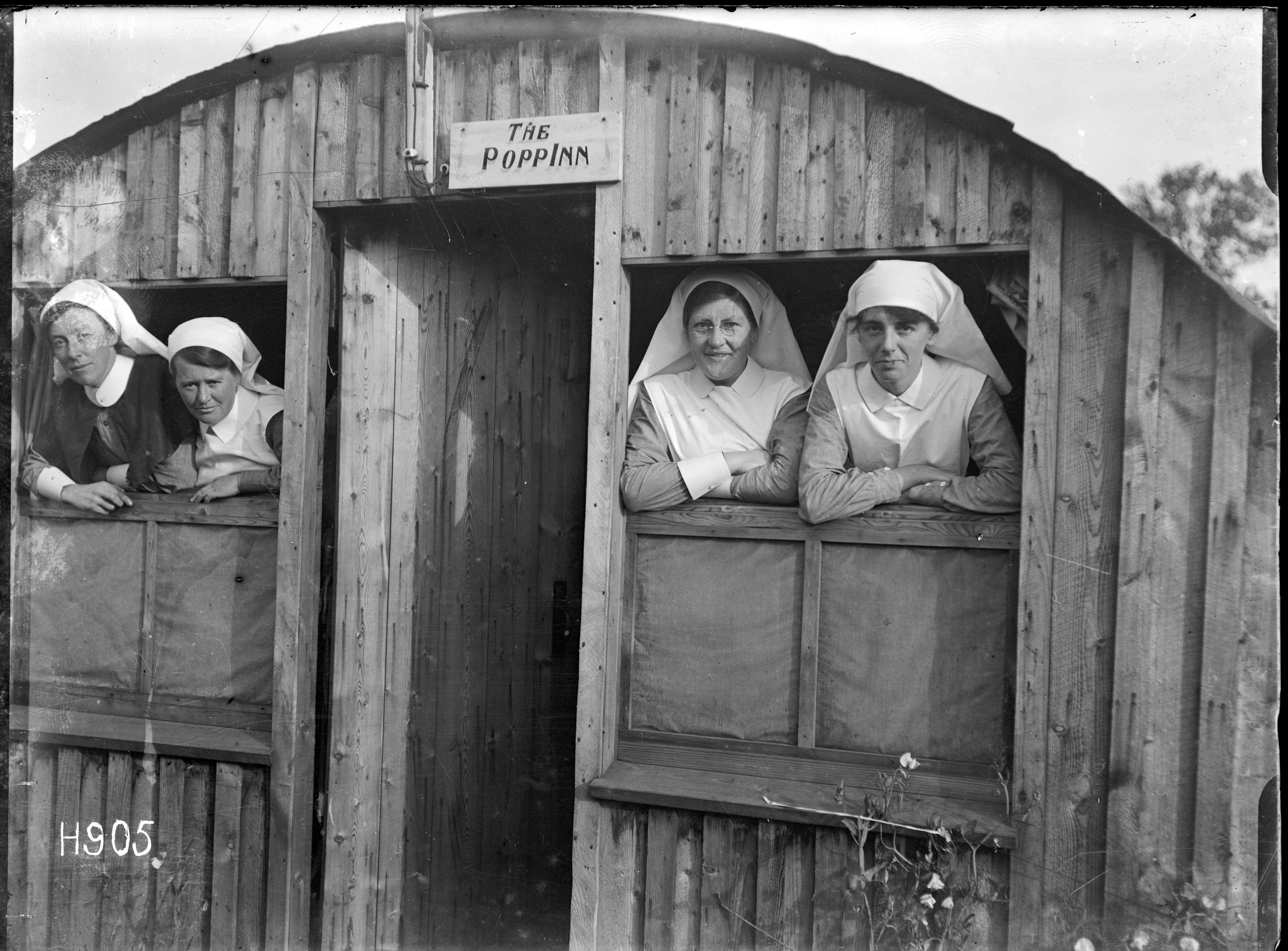
Nurses at a New Zealand hospital in France, 1918

=== German Spring Offensive, 1918 ===
On 20 March 1918, the Germans launched their great Spring Offensive. The New Zealand Division, which was back up to full strength and trained in open warfare tactics was rushed forward three days later to stem a breakthrough in the First Battle of the Somme, which threatened Amiens. The infantry made a rapid march to a gap in the front lines which had opened up between the British IV and V Corps in the Ancre Valley.

After confused fighting, the New Zealanders eventually gained the upper hand and soon were counter-attacking advantageous land, stabilising the British line.

=== Hundred Days Offensive ===
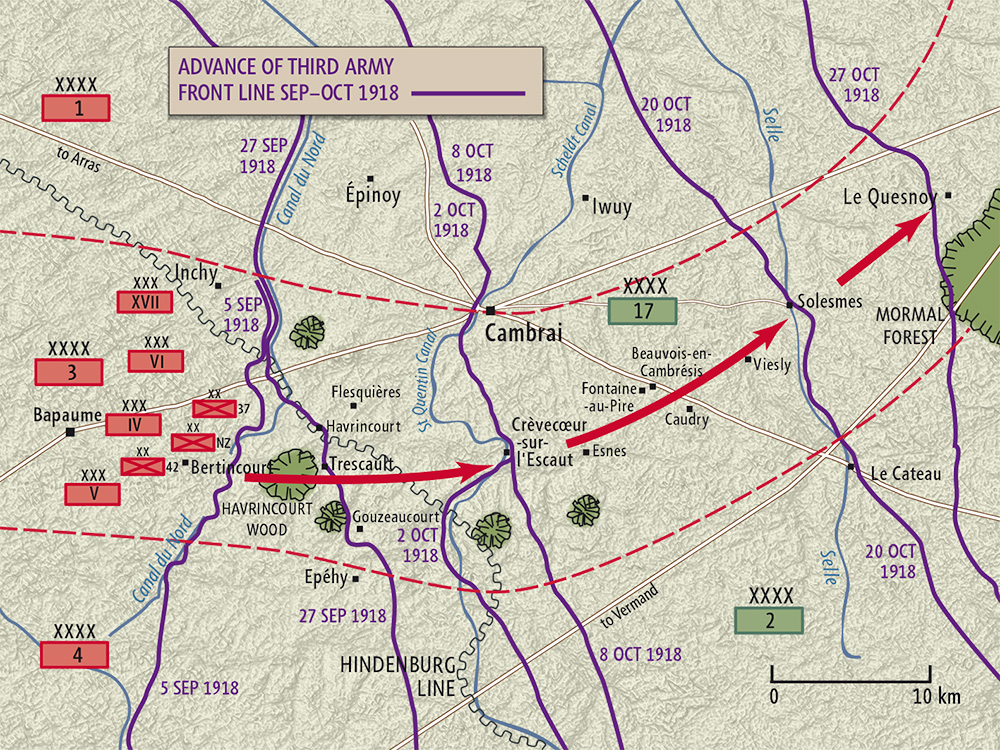
The advance of the New Zealand Division – part of the Third Army's IV Corps – during the 100 Days Offensive.

Later in the year, the New Zealand Division excelled in the open country fighting that was brought about by the Allied counter-offensive. Held back in the early stages of the campaign, it was first employed in the Battle of Albert on 21 August as the lead element of IV Corps. In the actions that followed, the division was often used to exploit initial breakthroughs made by the British divisions.

In its last action of the war, the New Zealand Division captured the ancient fortress (Vauban-designed) town of Le Quesnoy in a daring assault on 4 November. The day proved to be the division's most successful of their whole time on the Western Front as they pushed east and advanced ten kilometres, capturing 2,000 German soldiers and 60 field guns. The town occupied a strategic position in north-eastern France and had been held by the Germans since 1914. Although with no specific orders indicating that the town need to be captured with any haste, the New Zealand soldiers were determined to and just before midday the first New Zealand troops reached the outer walls and scaled them with ladders. Propping the ladders against the precariously narrow inner walls, sections of one New Zealand battalion ascended the walls and engaged in hand-to-hand fighting with fleeing German defenders. The few thousand strong German garrison surrendered soon after New Zealand soldiers entered the town itself. The infantry were relieved on the eastern side of the forest at midnight on 5–6 November and the war ended five days later.

The division left the Third Army on 28 November, and marched through Belgium, to entrain at the German frontier for Cologne and take up billets in neighbouring towns as part of the army of occupation. During their time in Germany, the soldiers mostly patrolled at night to maintain a curfew. Although prohibited, there was fraternisation with the locals while soldiers waited for demobilisation. By February 1919, there was a steady stream of New Zealanders making their way home and the New Zealand Division was disbanded on 25 March at Mülheim near Cologne.

The New Zealand Division represented the country's main contribution to the conflict in Europe. The cost of maintaining the division for two and a half years on the Western Front was appalling. Altogether some 13,250 New Zealanders died of wounds or sickness as a direct result of this campaign, including 50 as prisoners of war and more than 700 at home. Another 35,000 were wounded, and 414 prisoners of war were ultimately repatriated. The total casualties therefrom approached 50,000, well over half the number of those who served in France or Belgium.

== Other theatres ==
New Zealand also contributed to the war at sea, with the New Zealand Naval Forces being a division of the Royal Navy. Immediately after the start of the war, the cruiser HMS Philomel, loaned to New Zealand as a training ship, was augmented with 70 New Zealand reservists and sailed with two Royal Navy cruisers to escort the New Zealand troops sent to occupy German Samoa. Later in 1914 these three ships also escorted the New Zealand Expeditionary Force to Egypt.

From January 1915, Philomel patrolled the Gulf of Alexandretta in the Eastern Mediterranean, supporting several landings and sustaining three fatal casualties, one being the first New Zealander killed in action in the war. She also took part in the defence of the Suez Canal, operations in the Gulf of Aden and patrols in the Persian Gulf. Although refitting from time to time at Malta or Bombay kept her seaworthy, age eventually forced her out of the war and in March 1917 she returned to Wellington for a major overhaul.

New Zealand was not subject to any significant direct military threat during the war. Although Germany had plans for naval raids on Australia and New Zealand, the threat from her Asiatic Squadron did not eventuate, as that force moved across the Pacific before being destroyed at the Battle of the Falkland Islands.

In June 1917, a German surface raider, the SMS Wolf entered New Zealand waters. As well as capturing and sinking two vessels, she laid two small minefields in New Zealand waters. These were responsible for the sinking of two merchant ships; one (the Port Kembla) off Farewell Spit, and another (the Wairuna) off the Kermadec Islands. Two fishing trawlers, the Nora Niven and Simplon, were fitted as minesweepers and took up sweeping duties in these areas. Another brief flurry of activity occurred when Felix von Luckner, imprisoned on Motuihe Island after being captured in the Society Islands, escaped and commandeered a small vessel before being recaptured in the Kermadec Islands.

New Zealand also contributed a wireless troop to the Mesopotamian Campaign. The Wireless Troop was formed in New Zealand and arrived at Basra in April 1916. In Mesopotamia the New Zealand troop was amalgamated with the 1st Australian Wireless Signal Squadron, forming "C" Wireless Troop of the Anzac Squadron. The troop was much affected by disease, but once in operation was attached to the Cavalry Division in the assault on Baghdad. The Wireless Troop was among the first batch of troops to enter the city on 11 March 1917. The Wireless Troop joined further operations in Mesopotamia and was then moved to Persia. In June 1917, the troop was redirected to France, where it was absorbed into the New Zealand Divisional Signal Company. See also below under Mesopotamia Flight.

== Service in the Air ==
New Zealand had no air force of her own during the First World War but about 850 New Zealanders served with the Royal Flying Corps, the Royal Naval Air Service (RNAS) and the Royal Air Force, both as aircrew and ground crew. Estimates range from 500 to 1000, as there were no official Defence Force figures. New Zealanders travelled to England to enlist, or were already with the Army in Europe. Some got indulgence passages on troopships, and appeared on the ship lists. A number of them became commanding officers of squadrons: including Major Keith Park, later to command No. 11 Group in the Battle of Britain during World War II. and Arthur Coningham who planned air support for the Normandy landings.

The first New Zealand flying ace of the war was Flight Lieutenant Thomas Culling, who flew with the RNAS. He was killed in June 1917, having shot down five aircraft. Most served with the Royal Flying Corps or the Royal Naval Air Service, which in 1918 were amalgamated into the Royal Air Force. The majority were Lieutenants or Second Lieutenants, but a number were Air Mechanics. Harriet Simeon joined the Women’s Royal Air Force. The highest scoring New Zealand flying ace was Captain Ronald Bannerman, who achieved 16 aerial victories, including one over a balloon. About 79 New Zealand airmen died. A number died in flying accidents or in training rather than in action.

The Mesopotamia Flight supplied by Australia in 1915 included six New Zealand airmen: Hugh Reilly, William Burn (died 1915, the first New Zealand airman killed in the war) and Will Scotland; and air mechanics Francis Adams (died in 1916 as a POW), Stanley Brewster and Laurence Pitcher.

Postwar and in the Second World War, some attained high rank in New Zealand: (Ronald Bannerman, Keith Calder, Leonard Isitt; or Britain: (Arthur Coningham, Keith Park),

== Recruiting and conscription ==
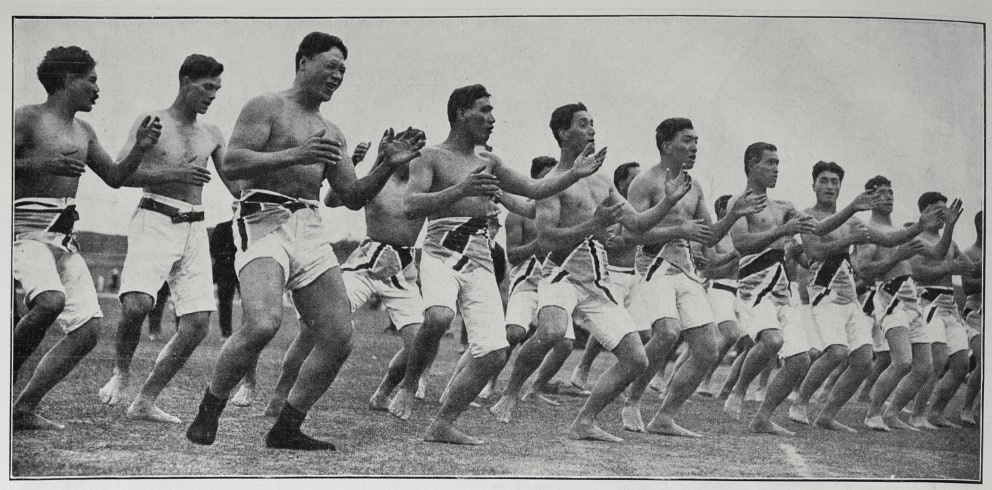
Maori soldiers performing a Haka dance at Avondale Camp 1915

On the outbreak of the war, recruitment for the New Zealand Expeditionary Force was on an entirely voluntary basis. The enthusiasm of the volunteers was such that some men were attempting to enlist even before the official announcement of hostilities. The number of volunteers was such that the authorities in London were advised that the NZEF could depart as early as 27 August although more time would be preferable. To follow the main body of the NZEF, which departed New Zealand on 16 October 1914, a series of drafts of reinforcements were dispatched, typically one a month. By the end of the war, a total of 42 drafts, totalling around 84,000 men had been sent.

By early 1916, the supply of volunteers for the NZEF had slowed significantly. At the same time, the NZEF had expanded in preparation for its service on the Western Front. After efforts to stimulate volunteers failed, conscription was introduced by the New Zealand government in the form of the Military Service Act. Under this legislation, the first ballot for conscripts was held in Wellington on 16 November 1916. Men between 20 and 45 could be conscripted, subject to a medical check and limited rights of objection on conscience, family or business grounds. An individual could appeal their call-up by applying to a Military Service Board but relatively few were successful. A total of 135,000 men would be called up by war's end although only 32,700 served with the NZEF. The major proportion of the remainder were found to not be fit for service.

Conscription was extended to Māori for the "Native Contingent" in late 1917, with the first "Māori ballot" for the Waikato district held in May 1918. There was resistance in the Waikato (led by Princess Te Puea) to conscription. By the end of the war 552 Māori had been balloted, but no Māori conscripts had been sent overseas. A total of 2,227 Māori served in the war; this represented about 4.5% of the Māori population or under half of the total contribution per head of the total New Zealand population.

== Medical services ==
=== Hospitals ===
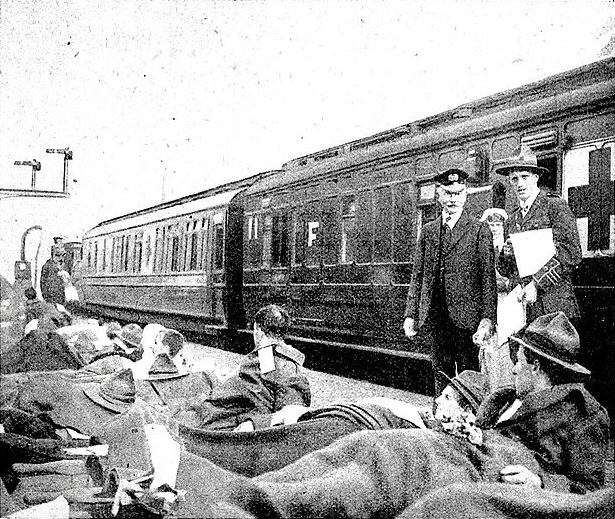
Walton-on-Thames railway station was about one and a quarter miles from No 2 New Zealand General Hospital

Once the NZEF was in Egypt and serving at Gallipoli, wounded or ill soldiers were treated at Australian and British hospitals in Egypt. Then from June to July 1915, two hospitals were set up at Port Said and Suez specifically for the NZEF. These were respectively No. 1 New Zealand Stationary Hospital and No. 2 New Zealand Stationary Hospital. At Port Said, there was capacity for 600 patients and it remained in place for the duration of the war. At Suez, the No. 2 New Zealand Stationary Hospital had capacity for just over 1,000 patients by June 1916 at which time it was transferred to the United Kingdom.

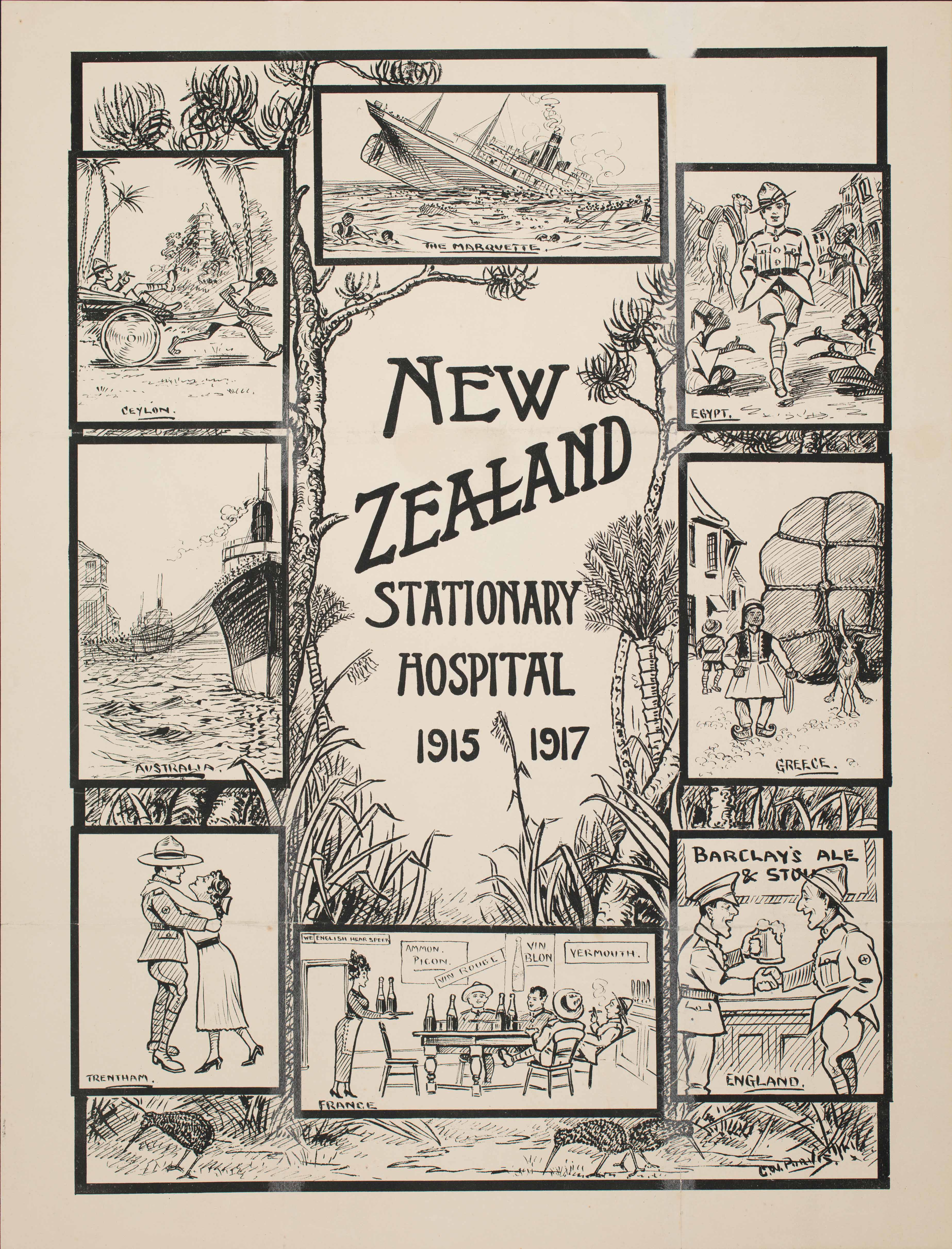
Poster produced during the First World War. Depicts scenes of Ceylon, Australia, Trentham, France, England, Greece, Egypt, and the troopship SS Marquette.

At least 30,000 New Zealanders would spend time in the United Kingdom being treated for wounds. The first hospital to be established there was the New Zealand War Contingent Hospital, at Walton-on-Thames; this began accepting patients, wounded from Gallipoli, in August 1915. The hospital was later re-designated as No. 2 New Zealand General Hospital and by the end of the war, had nearly 1,900 beds. A second hospital, to be designated No. 1 New Zealand General Hospital, was set up at Brockenhurst in June 1916 and within two years, it had capacity for close to 1,600 patients. No. 3 New Zealand General Hospital was established three months later at Codford, close to Sling Camp on the Salisbury Plain. At Hornchurch, the New Zealand Convalescent Hospital was established, and this had capacity for 2,500 patients. At this facility men who had nearly completed medical treatment received rehabilitation care to help prepare them for return to personnel depots.

=== Hospital ships ===
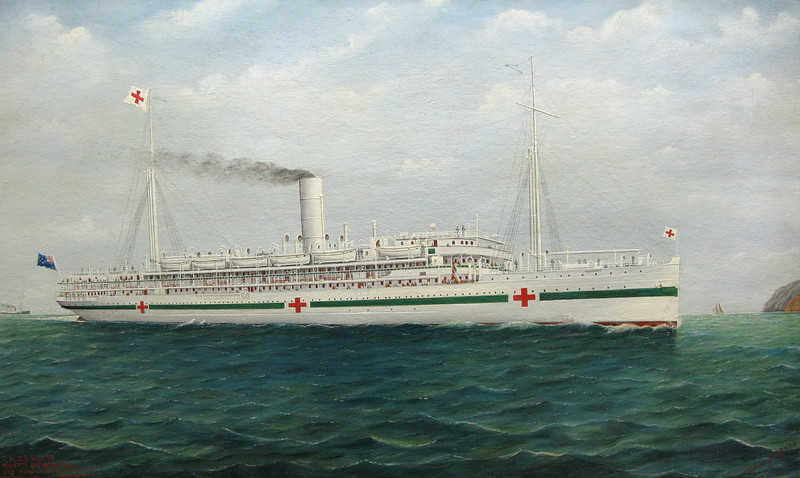
The Marama, fitted out as HMNZ Hospital Ship No. 2, off the coast of Wellington

Once the Gallipoli campaign was underway, the New Zealand government requisitioned two passenger liners from the Union Steam Ship Company for conversion to hospital ships. This was prompted by the scale of casualties following the landings at Anzac Cove. The vessels were the Maheno and Marama, which were officially designated as HMNZ Hospital Ship No. 1 and HMNZ Hospital Ship No. 2 respectively. The first to enter service was Maheno which, after being refitted at Port Chalmers, arrived off Anzac Cove on 26 August 1915. The Marama, which carried 600 beds, followed a few months later. Between the two ships, a total of 17 voyages were made back to New Zealand. In addition, a number of shorter trips were made to other destinations. Around 47,000 wounded, including German prisoners-of-war, were transported aboard the Maheno and Marama.

=== Serbian awards to medical personnel ===
Seven women (three doctors and four nurses), who were either born in or later settled in New Zealand were awarded Serbian honours for their participation in the medical services in the Balkans campaign. Jessie Scott and Agnes Bennett served with the Scottish Women's Hospital for Foreign Service. Scott was awarded the Order of St Sava 4th class and Bennett the Order of St Sava 3rd class and the medal of the Red Cross of Serbia. Mildred Staley was awarded the Order of St Sava (class unknown) for her work in support of the Serbian Army. Ethel Lewis was a nurse with the 1st British Hospital attached to the Serbian Army. For helping to save the life of a Serbian soldier and evacuate hundreds of patients through the mountains she was awarded the Order of the White Eagle (class unknown), Order of St Sava (3rd class) and the Serbian Royal Red Cross 2nd class. Nurses Elizabeth Young and Mary O'Connor were awarded the Royal Red Cross 2nd class and the Serbian Samaritan Cross for nursing service. Emily Peter, who joined the Serbian Relief Fund venture supported by the American Red Cross, was awarded Serbian Samaritan Cross and Serbian Red Cross medal.

== Repatriation ==
Shortages of shipping, influenza and strikes were among causes for delays in repatriating troops after the war. The frustration of the delay resulted in riots at Sling Camp in March 1919 and at Ismailia in July. Allied governments paid compensation for looted Egyptian shops. New Zealand's share of the cost was £2,529 (2016 equivalent $250,000).

== Cemeteries and memorials ==
New Zealand war deaths are buried or commemorated in Commonwealth War Graves Commission (CWGC) cemeteries with other allied soldiers. Gallipoli dead are buried in 24 CWGC cemeteries in Turkey, and in CWGC cemeteries in Egypt, Gibraltar, Greece and Malta. There are memorials to the New Zealand missing on Chunuk Bair and at three CWGC cemeteries: Hill 60 Cemetery, Lone Pine Cemetery and Twelve Tree Copse Cemetery.

On the Western Front missing New Zealand soldiers are commemorated in cemeteries near where they were lost rather than at the large memorials of Menin Gate and the Thiepval Memorial on the Somme. The New Zealand monuments to the missing are at Messines in Belgium and Armentierses, Longueval (Caterpillar Valley Cemetery), Grevillers, and Marfaux in France. There are four national battlefield memorials at Passchendaele, Messines, the Somme and Le Quesnoy.

At least 700 New Zealanders died in England. Most of these were due to illness, disease and their wounds, and nearly 100 of these are buried at the CWGC cemetery at Brockenhurst. Another 20 or so were killed in accidents or as a result of misadventure.

== Archives ==
Major repositories and archives for material focused on New Zealand's involvement in World War I include the Commonwealth War Graves Commission online database, Online Cenotaph, a biographical database of military personnel and service people managed by Auckland War Memorial Museum, and the New Zealand official photograph collection record held at the Alexander Turnbull Library. The World War I official photographs archives were added to the UNESCO New Zealand Memory of the World Register in 2017.

== See also ==
- Bere Ferrers rail accident in which ten NZEF soldiers died in 1917
- SS Marquette troopship sunk 1915 with 32 New Zealanders including 10 nurses lost
- List of New Zealand soldiers executed during World War I
- Bulford Kiwi a memento to New Zealand soldiers who were stationed in Wiltshire.
