= William Ham =

First New Zealand soldier to be killed in WWI

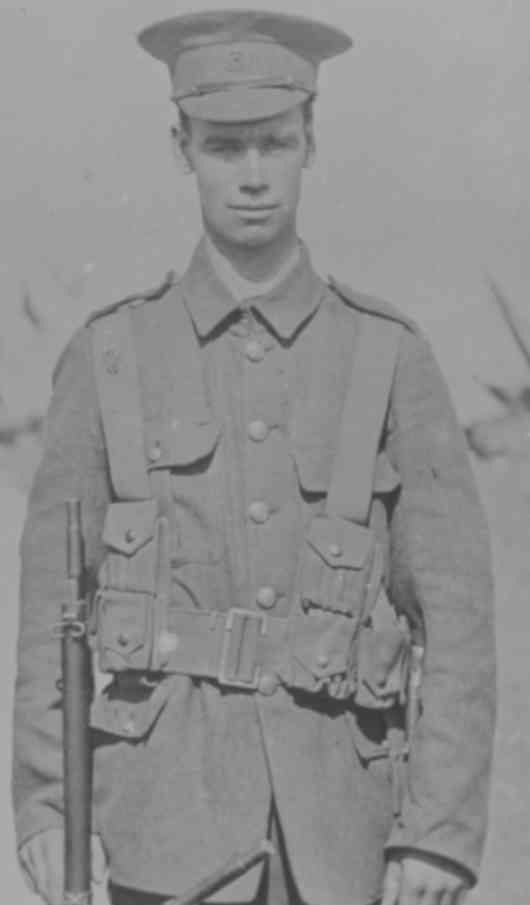
- Born: William Arthur Ham; 14 April 1892; Bray, County Wicklow, Ireland
- Died: 5 February 1915 (aged 22); Ismailia, Egypt
- Burial place: Ismailia War Memorial, Egypt
- Military career
- Allegiance: New Zealand
- Branch: New Zealand Army
- Service years: 1914–1915
- Rank: Private
- Nicknames: Willie, Bill
- Service number: 6/246
- Unit: 12th (Nelson and Marlborough) Regiment
- Conflicts: World War I †; Sinai and Palestine Campaign; Raid on the Suez Canal †

William Arthur Ham was a New Zealand soldier. He was the first New Zealand service member to be killed in World War I.

== Early life ==
Ham was born on 14 April 1892, in Bray, County Wicklow, Ireland, to William and Hester Ham.

Ham, a Protestant Irish, had five brothers, and his family emigrated from Ireland to New Zealand in October 1903 on SS Athenic, which ended up being the same ship which would take him to war. They went from Gisborne, to Whanganui, before shifting south to Ngātīmoti, in Motueka where they ended up residing in 1905. He enrolled in Orinoco School that same year, and his family attended St James Anglican Church.

== Military service ==
Within two weeks of war breaking out, Ham had volunteered for service overseas. At the time he had been working as a labourer for the Waimea County Council survey team, and was a member of the Territorial Force. He embarked on SS Athenic on 16 October 1914 from Wellington and arrived in Alexandria on 3 December. After disembarking, the Australians and New Zealanders were encamped at Zeitoun, outside of Cairo.

On 3 February 1915, fighting began on the Suez Canal. Ham's company was stationed right at the centre of the Turkish attack. On the same afternoon, whilst closing on the 22nd Indian Brigade Headquarters, the 12th Company came under fire. A stray bullet ricocheted off Ham's rifle and struck his neck, breaking his spine. He was transferred to Ismailia Hospital and died of his wound two days later, on 5 February. His funeral was held on the 7th and the whole company was in attendance. He was buried at the CWGC Ismailia War Memorial Cemetery with full military honours where he still lays.

== Legacy ==
Ham was the first of 18,000 New Zealand soldiers to be killed during the First World War. Then minister of defence, James Allen described him as:

"the first upon the roll of honour of the New Zealanders to die in action for their King and country in upholding justice and right".

Due to the fact he spent his early childhood in Ireland, his name is also inscribed on the Bray War Memorial and its local Roll of Honour.
