= Church of the Virgin Mary (Zeitoun) =

Virgin Mary Coptic Orthodox Church
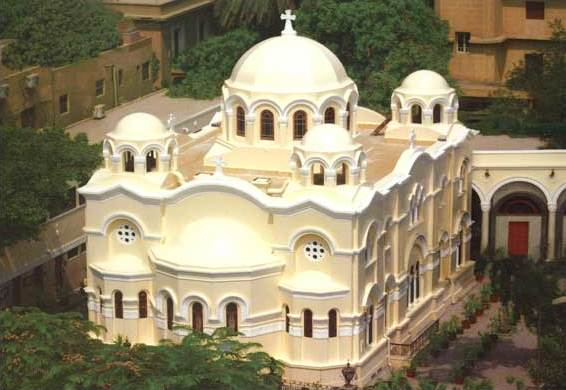
- Location: Zeitoun, Cairo
- Country: Egypt
- Denomination: Coptic Orthodox Church of Alexandria

History
- Founded: 29 June 1925
- Dedication: Saint Mary
- Consecrated: 29 June 1925

Architecture
- Architect: Tawfik Kalil Ibrahim
- Architectural type: Byzantine architecture
- Style: Byzantine architecture

Clergy
- Bishop: Pope Tawadros II

The Church of the Virgin Mary at Zeitoun (The Apparition Church) is a Christian church in Cairo, Egypt, built in 1924.

== Overview ==
The church was built by Tawfik Khalil Ibrahim, in memory of his father. It was designed as a miniature of the Hagia Sophia church in Istanbul, Turkey and built under the supervision of the Italian architect Leomingelli.

Allegedly based upon a vision Ibrahim had seen, it is said that the Virgin Mary told him that she would appear in her church at Zeitoun after forty years. The church was consecrated during a mass on June 29, 1925. According to tradition, the site is one of the locations where the Holy Family stayed during their flight into Egypt.

Some of the icons in the church were donated by the Emperor Haile Selassie.

== Apparition ==
On the evening of Tuesday, 2 April 1968 (24 Baramhat 1684 in the Coptic calendar), sightings of the Virgin Mary and associated phenomena were reported by a group of individuals at the church. Luminous scenes were reported to be seen over the domes of St. Mary's church at Zeitoun. The first apparition was seen by the workmen of a garage belonging to the Public Transport Authority opposite the church. Among them was the watchman, Abdul Aziz Ali, who saw a luminous body of a young lady kneeling next to the cross located on the largest dome of the church.

Ali started shouting, "A light over the dome!" Then he called upon his fellow workers to look at the lady on the roof of the church. Some of them thought it was a young lady trying to commit suicide, so they shouted a warning to her. She was standing over the dome in her white robe, and she was holding in her hand what appeared to be an olive branch. Then they saw her moving, and a light was emanating from her body all around her. After identifying her as the Virgin Mary, they began shouting, "It is the Virgin... It is Virgin Mary."

This apparition was reported to be accompanied by various spiritual phenomena including:

- Spiritual bodies in the form of doves, flying with great speed, breaking through the sky over the church.
- Stars dropping very rapidly above the domes and over the roof of the church.
- Flashes, like lightning, radiating from the church domes, mainly from the northeast dome.
- Fragrant incense spreading and filling the place over the central dome, the roof, and the church itself.
- Luminous clouds over the church domes, in the form of the Virgin Mary.

The apparitions lasted for three years. They were investigated by the Coptic Church and Roman Catholic Church and were accepted by both.

In 1971, after the "miracle of Zeitoun", the Egyptian artist Yacoub Fanous painted additional icons on the walls of the church. He adorned the apse with a painting of Jesus Christ Pantocrator and, on the dome that had been arranged with stars on a blue background, he painted the Virgin Mary with outspread arms.

== Annual celebration ==
Every year on 2 April, the church celebrates the apparition in a gathering of thousands of believers who wish to honor Mary, seeking her blessing and intercession.

- "Blessed are you, O Mary, the ever-lighted lamp." – St. Cyril of Alexandria
- "Blessed are you, O Mary, the heaven-bearer of the Divinity." – St. Ephrem the Syrian
- "Blessed are you, O Mary, who is more honored than the Cherubim and more glorified than the Seraphim." – St. John Chrysostom
- "Blessed is our land, and blessed is our Holy church, which the Blessed Virgin has chosen from all parts of the world to appear in, in a very special and unprecedented manner." – Pope Shenouda III of Alexandria

== Facilities ==
The church runs a hospital and accommodation for the elderly.
