= Critique of Religious Thought (book) =

Book by Sadiq Jalal Al-Azem

Critique of Religious Thought نقد الفكر الديني
- Author: Sadiq Jalal Al-Azm
- Translator: Mansour Ajami
- Language: Arabic
- Subject: Criticism of religions
- Publisher: Gerlach Press
- Publication date: 1969
- Publication place: Syria - Lebanon
- English publication date: 2015
- ISBN: 3940924458
- OCLC: 1162391373

Critique of Religious Thought (Arabic: نقد الفكر الديني) is a book by the Syrian philosopher and thinker, Sadiq Jalal Al-Azm. It was published in its first edition in 1969 by Dar Al-Tali`a in Beirut, and then it was republished in dozens of editions. Upon its publication, the book caused (and still now) a sensation in the Arab and Islamic worlds. Because of it, Al-Azm was subjected to trial and legal prosecutions in Beirut at the time. This was done under the pretext of "stirring up sectarian, sectarian and racist strife" and "inciting conflict between the various sects of the nation or contempt of religions.

At the end of the second edition of his book, Al-Azm attached documents about his trial in Lebanon, including the indictment, the interrogation, and the court’s decision that dropped the charges brought against him, because what he wrote: “not a crime, but falls within the framework of freedom of thought, opinion and expression,” and includes “scientific research.” and includes scientific and philosophical criticism.

== Trial ==
Al-Azm complied with the court's decision on December 19, 1969, under the pretext of “disdain for both the Christian and Islamic religions” in his book, denying that what he wrote was directed at religious beliefs, as much as religious thought was concerned with reason and not belief.

Al-Azm was released a week later, and he was tried on the 27th of the same month, and the ruling was issued dismissing the case on July 7, 1970.

And soon the case against Al-Azm was closed, at that time the Lebanese Minister of Interior, Kamal Jumblatt.
