= 1968 United Arab Republic 30 March Program referendum =

- 2 May 1968
- Do you approve of the 30 March Program for national action?
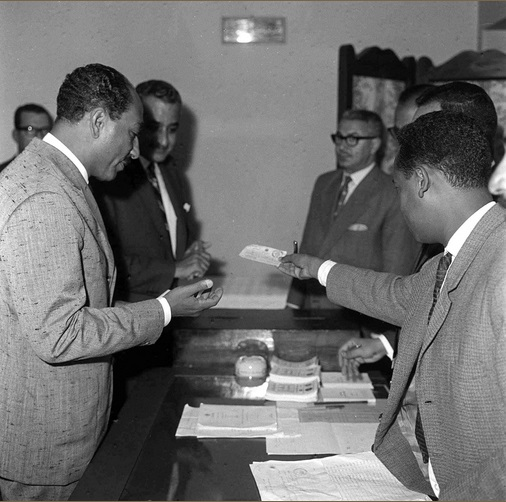
- President Gamal Abdel Nasser and Vice President Anwar Sadat cast their votes in the referendum in Alexandria
- Outcome: 30 March programme is enacted

Results
Choice	Votes	%
Yes	7,315,734	99.99%
No	798	0.01%
Valid votes	7,316,532	99.99%
Invalid or blank votes	887	0.01%
Total votes	7,317,419	100.00%
Registered voters/turnout	7,450,478	98.21%

A referendum on the 30 March Program was held in the United Arab Republic (now Egypt) on 2 May 1968. It was approved by 100% of voters, with only 798 votes against. Voter turnout was 98%.

== Results ==
Choice	Votes	%
For	7,315,734	99.99
Against	798	0.01
Total	7,316,532	100.00
Valid votes	7,316,532	99.99
Invalid/blank votes	887	0.01
Total votes	7,317,419	100.00
Registered voters/turnout	7,450,478	98.21
Source: Nohlen et al.
