= Zeitoun, Cairo =

District in Cairo, Egypt

Coordinates: 30.1050°N 31.3103°E

Zeitoun (Arabic: الزيتون meaning olives), also al-Zeitoun, is one of the eight districts that make up the Northern Area in Cairo, Egypt. It is known for its Marian apparitions at the Coptic Church of the Virgin Mary of Zeitoun, reported in 1968–1971.

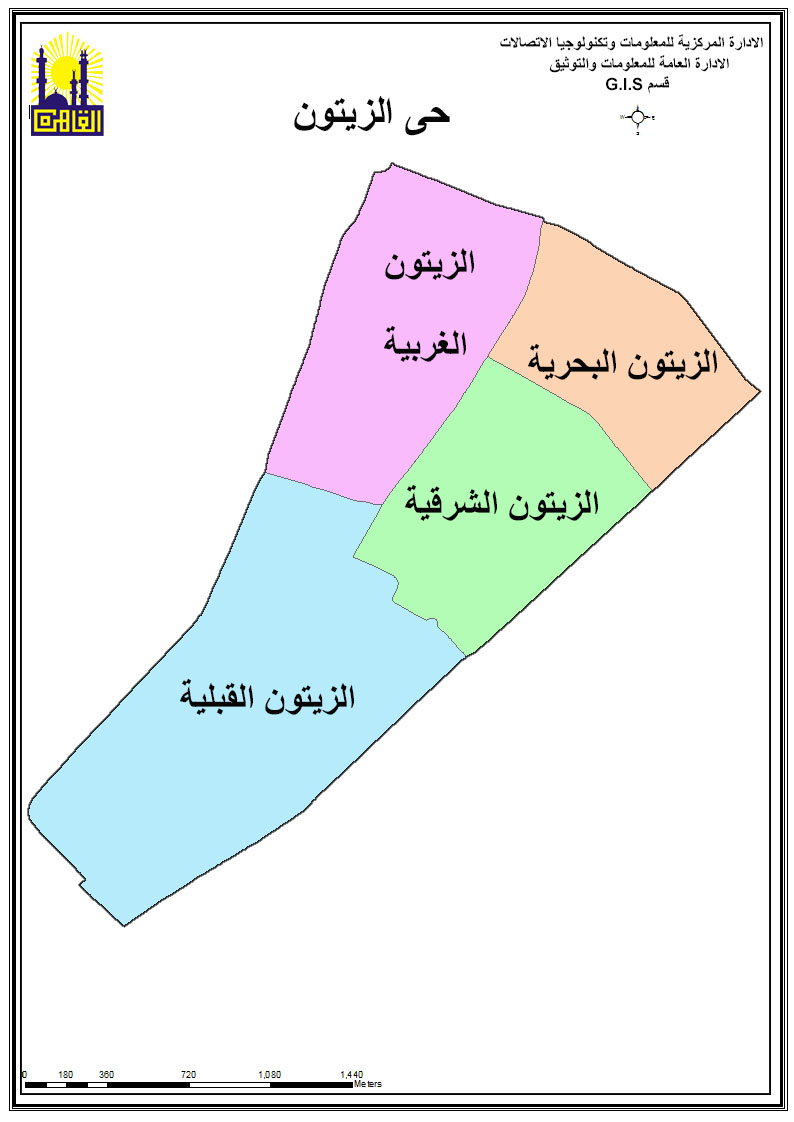
Cairo: Al-Zeitoun District Map

== History ==
Until the First World War, the area consisted of cultivated fields and was known as 'Izbet al-Zeitoun (Olive Estate). It lay on the outskirts of the Eastern Desert just north of Cairo, and to the east of the then-new Heliopolis suburb. While Egypt was under British occupation, the Imperial School of Instruction was built there, and New Zealand troops camped in the desert during the war.

As Cairo expanded, Tawfiq Khalil Bey a real estate developer, bought land there and subdivided it into a suburb named Zeitoun. He also built a church that housed a mausoleum for his father, Khalil Ibrahim Pasha, in response to an appearance of The Virgin Mary. Years later it would be known for a series of Marian apparitions.

== Notable people ==
It was the birthplace of Fathia Nkrumah (born Fathia Rizk to a Coptic family), wife of Kwame Nkrumah, the first President of Ghana.

== See also ==
- Zeitoun District official page
- Church of the Virgin Mary (Zeitoun)
