= Sadiq Jalal al-Azm =

Syrian philosopher

Sadiq Jalal Al-Azm
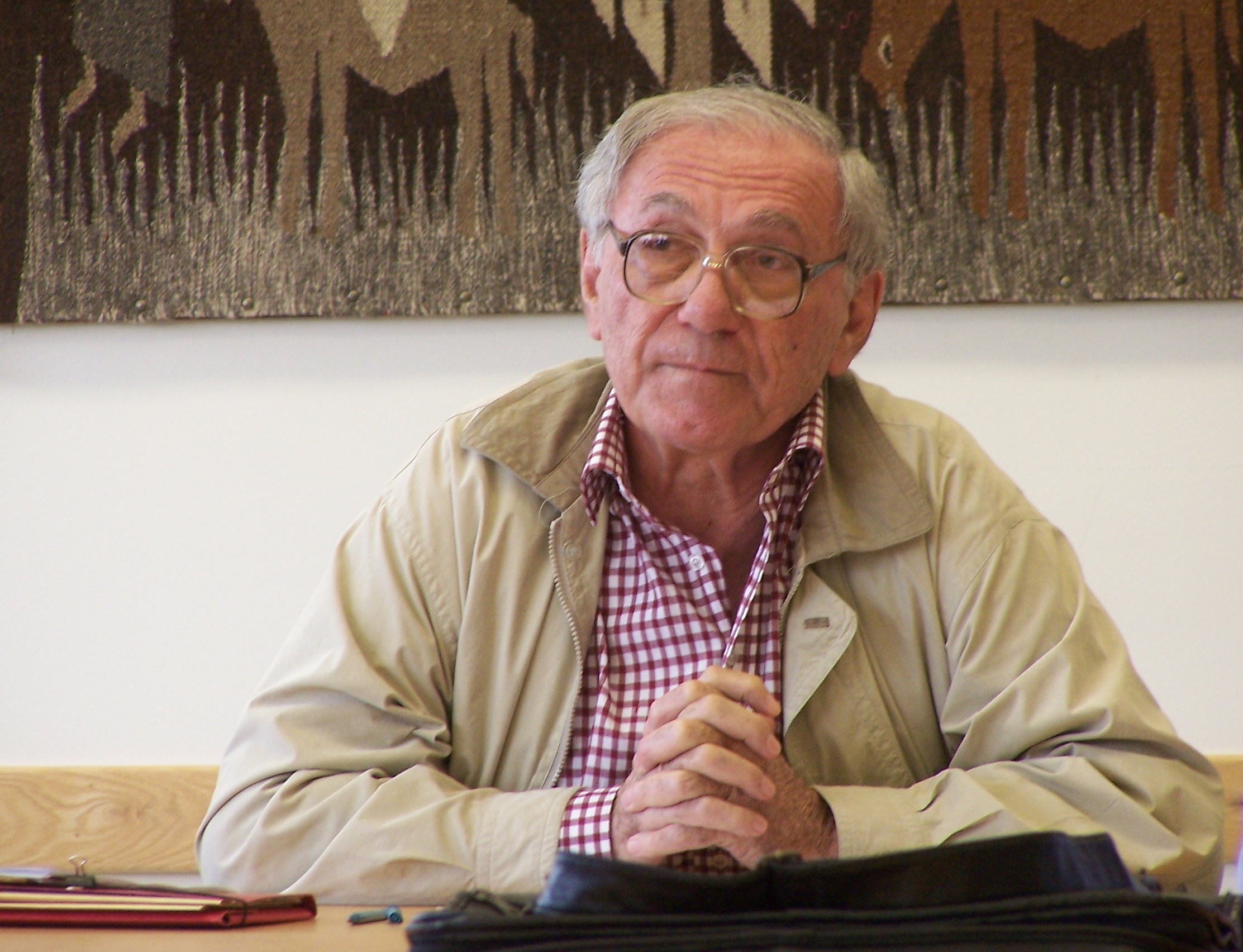
- Sadiq al-Azm at University of California, Los Angeles, 2006
- Born: 1934; Damascus, Syrian Republic
- Died: December 11, 2016 (aged 81–82); Berlin, Germany

Sadiq Jalal Al-Azm (Arabic: صادق جلال العظم, romanized: Ṣādiq Jalāl al-‘Aẓm; 1934 – December 11, 2016) was a Professor Emeritus of Modern European Philosophy at the University of Damascus in Syria and was, until 2007, a visiting professor in the Department of Near Eastern Studies at Princeton University. His main area of specialization was the work of German philosopher Immanuel Kant, but he later placed a greater emphasis upon the Islamic world and its relationship to the West, evidenced by his contribution to the discourse of Orientalism. Al-Azm was also known as a human rights advocate and a champion of intellectual freedom and free speech.

== Early life and education ==
Al-Azm was born in 1934 in Damascus, Syrian Republic, into the influential Al-Azm family. The Al-Azm family rose to prominence in the eighteenth century under the rule of the Ottoman Empire in the region of Syria. Al-Azm's father, Jalal al-Azm, was one of the Syrian secularists who was known to admire Mustafa Kemal Atatürk's secularist reforms in the Republic of Turkey.

Al-Azm was schooled in Beirut, Lebanon, earning a B.A. in Philosophy from the American University of Beirut in 1957. Al-Azm earned an M.A. in 1959 and a Ph.D. in 1961 from Yale University, majoring in Modern European Philosophy.

== Career ==
In 1963, after finishing his Ph.D., he began teaching at the American University of Beirut. His 1968 book Al-Nakd al-Dhati Ba’da al-Hazima (Self-Criticism After the Defeat) (Dar al-Taliah, Beirut) analyzes the impact of the Six-Day War on Arabs. Many of his books are banned in Arab nations (with the exception of Lebanon).

He was a professor of Modern European Philosophy in the Department of Philosophy and Sociology at the University of Damascus from 1977 to 1999. He continued to be active in lecturing at European and American universities as a visiting professor. In 2004, he won the Erasmus Prize with Fatema Mernissi and Abdulkarim Soroush. In 2004 he received the Dr. Leopold Lucas Prize awarded on behalf of the Protestant Faculty of the University of Tübingen by Professor Eilert Herms with an address entitled "Islam and Secular Humanism" In 2005, he became a Dr. Honoris Causa at Hamburg University. In 2015 he was awarded the Goethe Medal by the president of the Goethe Institute.

=== Controversy and arrest ===
Al-Azm was at the center of a political controversy in December 1969 when he was arrested in absentia with his publisher by the Lebanese government; he had fled to Syria only to later return to Beirut to turn himself in, where he was jailed in early January 1970. He was charged for writing a book that aimed at provoking feuds among the religious sects of Lebanon. This was after publication in book form of various essays that previously appeared in journals, magazines and periodicals. Together, they comprised the 1969 book, Naqd al-Fikr al-Dini (Critique of Religious Thought) (Dar al-Taliah, Beirut). In it, Al-Azm's rebuke of political and religious leaders and the media who supported them for exploiting their populations' religious sentiments was relentless and made him enemies. He applied a Marxist-materialist critique to religion, not to discredit people's religious commitments, but to expose how "Arab regimes found in religion a crutch they could use to calm down the Arab public and cover-up for their incompetence and failure laid bare by the defeat, by adopting religious and spiritual explanations for the Israeli victory...."

Al-Azm was released from prison in mid-January 1970 after the "Court decided in consensus to drop the charges filed against the Defendant Sadiq Al-Azm and Bashir Al-Daouk due to the lack of criminal elements they were charged with." Subsequent editions of Naqd al-Fikr al-Dini include the Documents from the Tribunal and continue to be published in Arabic to this day, though with restricted access in the Middle East.

Al-Azm long believed his arrest was motivated by other factors, perhaps as a way to "settle scores with their critics and foes." Regardless, the arguments Al-Azm raised in Critique of Religious Thought continue to be debated, and there have been numerous books published in Arabic furthering the positions of both sides of the debate. The most thorough chronicling of the "affair", to use the author's own words, outside the Middle East was in the German journal, Der Islam, by Stefan Wild in an essay translated "God and Man in Lebanon: The Sadiq Al-Azm Affair" in 1971.

=== Prominent views ===
Historian Albert Hourani characterizes Al-'Azm's writing as "a total rejection of religious thought." Al-Azm was a critic of Edward Said's Orientalism, claiming that it essentialises 'the West' in the same manner that Said criticises imperial powers and their scholars of essentialising 'the East'. In a 1981 essay, Al-Azm wrote of Said: "the stylist and polemicist in Edward Said very often runs away with the systematic thinker ... we find Said ... tracing the origins of Orientalism all the way back to Homer, Aeschylus, Euripides and Dante. In other words, Orientalism is not really a thoroughly modern phenomenon, as we thought earlier, but is the natural product of an ancient and almost irresistible European bent of mind to misrepresent the realities of other cultures, peoples and their languages. ... Here the author seems to be saying that the 'European mind', from Homer to Karl Marx and A.H.R.Gibb, is inherently bent on distorting all human realities other than its own."

Within a decade, Al-Azm became an active participant in the dialogue surrounding free speech and the 1988 publication of The Satanic Verses by Salman Rushdie.

== Bibliography (English) ==
Al-Azm wrote numerous books and articles in Arabic, and some have been translated into European languages including Italian, German, Danish, French. Selections of Naqd al-Fikr al-Dini first appeared in English translation in John J. Donohue and John L. Esposito's Islam in Transition: Muslim Perspectives ([1982] 2007, 2nd Ed.) Additionally, chapter two of Nakd al-Fikr al-Dini was translated into English in a 2011 Festschrift in honor of al-Azm's career published under the title Orientalism and Conspiracy: Politics and Conspiracy Theory in the Islamic World, Essays in Honour of Sadiq J. Al-Azm. Since then, both Al-Nakd al-Dhati Ba’da al-Hazima and Naqd al-Fikr al-Dini have been translated in their entirety.

=== Books ===
- 1967 Kant's Theory of Time New York, Philosophical Library.
- 1972 The Origins of Kant's Arguments in the Antinomies Oxford, Clarendon/Oxford University Press.
- 1980 Four Philosophical Essays Damascus, Damascus University Publications.
- 1992 The Mental Taboo: Salman Rushdie and the Truth Within Literature. London, Riad El-Rayess Books.
- 2004 Islam und säkularer Humanismus (Islam and Secular Humanism), Tübingen: Mohr Siebeck, 2005 ISBN 3-16-148527-0
- 2011 Self-Criticism After the Defeat. Saqi Books. London.
- 2013 Secularism, Fundamentalism, and the Struggle for the Meaning of Islam. (Collected essays in 3 volumes) – Vol. 1: On Fundamentalisms; Vol. 2: Islam – Submission and Disobedience; Vol. 3: Is Islam Secularizable? Challenging Political and Religious Taboos. Gerlach Press, Berlin 2013–2014, ISBN 978-3-940924-20-9
- 2014 Critique of Religious Thought. ISBN 3940924458, in Arabic published in 1969 (Arabic: نقد الفكر الديني).
- 2014 Islam - submission and disobedience ISBN 9783940924223

=== Articles ===
- 1967 "Whitehead's Notions of Order and Freedom." The Personalist: International Review of Philosophy, Theology and Literature. University of Southern California. 48:4, 579-591.
- 1968 "Absolute Space and Kant's First Antinomy of Pure Reason." Kant-Studien University of Koln, 2:151-164.
- 1968 "Kant's Conception of the Noumenon." Dialogue: Canadian Philosophical Review Queen's University, 6:4, 516-520.
- 1973 "The Palestinian Resistance Movement Reconsidered." The Arabs Today: Alternatives for Tomorrow Columbus, Ohio: Forum Associates Inc., 121-135.
- 1981 "Orientalism and Orientalism in Reverse." Khamsin No.8: 5-26. Reprinted in Alexander Lyon Macfie, Ed. Orientalism: A Reader New York: New York University Press, 2000. 217-238." See Reference 1 for full article link.
- 1988 "Palestinian Zionism." Die Welt Des Islams Leiden, 28: 90-98.
- 1991 "The Importance of Being Earnest About Salman Rushdie." Die Welt Des Islams 31:1, 1-49. Reprinted in D.M.Fletcher, Ed. Reading Rushdie: Perspectives on the Fiction of Salman Rushdie Amsterdam/Atlanta: Rodopi, 1994.
- 1993/1994 "Islamic Fundamentalism Reconsidered: A Critical Outline of Problems, Ideas and Approaches." South Asia Bulletin, Comparative Studies of South Asia, Africa and the Middle East Part 1:13:93-121 Part 2: 14:73-98
- 1994 "Is the Fatwa a Fatwa?" In For Rushdie: Essays by Arab and Muslim Writers in Defense of Free Speech Anouar Abdallah, et al. New York: George Braziller.
- 1996 "Is Islam Secularizable?" Jahrbuch fur Philosophie des Forschungsinstituts fur Philosophie.
- 2000 "The Satanic Verses Post Festum:The Global, The Local, The Literary." Comparative Studies of South Asia, Africa and the Middle East 20:1&2.
- 2000 "The View from Damascus" New York Review of Books June 15.
- 2000 "The View from Damascus, cont'd." New York Review of Books August 10.
- 2002 "Western Historical Thinking from an Arabian Perspective." in Western Historical Thinking: An Intercultural Debate Edited Jorn Rusen. New York: Berghahn Books. [Original German 1999]
- 2004 "Viewpoint: Islam, Terrorism and the West Today." Die Welt Des Islams 44:1, 114-128.
- 2004 "Time Out of Joint." Boston Review October/November
- 2008 "Science and Religion, an Uneasy Relationship in the Judeo-Christian-Muslim Heritage." Islam and Europe: Challenges and Opportunities. Marie-Claire Foblets, Ed.
- 2010 "Farewell, Master of Critical Thought." On the passing of Egyptian intellectual Nasr Abu Zayd
- 2011 "Orientalism and Conspiracy." In Orientalism and Conspiracy. See above, pgs. 3-28.
- 2011 "The Arab Spring: 'Why Exactly at this Time?'" originally published in Arabic in Al Tariq Quarterly (Beirut) Summer 2011, English translation by Steve Miller in Reason Papers: A Journal of Interdisciplinary Normative Studies vol. 33 Fall 2011.

== Interviews ==
- "An interview with Sadik Al-Azm - University of Damascus professor". Arab Studies Quarterly. 19 (3). Summer 1997. Archived from the original on July 16, 2006 – via FindArticles.
- 1998 "Trends in Arab Thought: An Interview with Sadek Jalal al-Azm." Journal of Palestine Studies, 27:2, 68-80.
- 2000 "Analysis: The Rise and Rise of Bashar." BBC news report. June 21.
- 2005 "An Arab Exit Strategy." An Internet interview with Sadik al-Azm, Vali Nasr, Vahal Abdulrahman and Ammar Adbulhamid on Open Source Radio. November 10.
- 2009 Portrait Sadiq Al-Azm: An Argumentative Arab Enlightener
- 2011 Interview with Sadiq Jalal al-Azm: A New Spirit of Revolution
- 2013 Interview with Dr. Sadiq Jalal Al-Azm: The Syrian Revolution and the Role of the Intellectual, Al-Jumhuriyya Group.
