= Pierina Gilli =

Italian religious visionary (1911–1991)

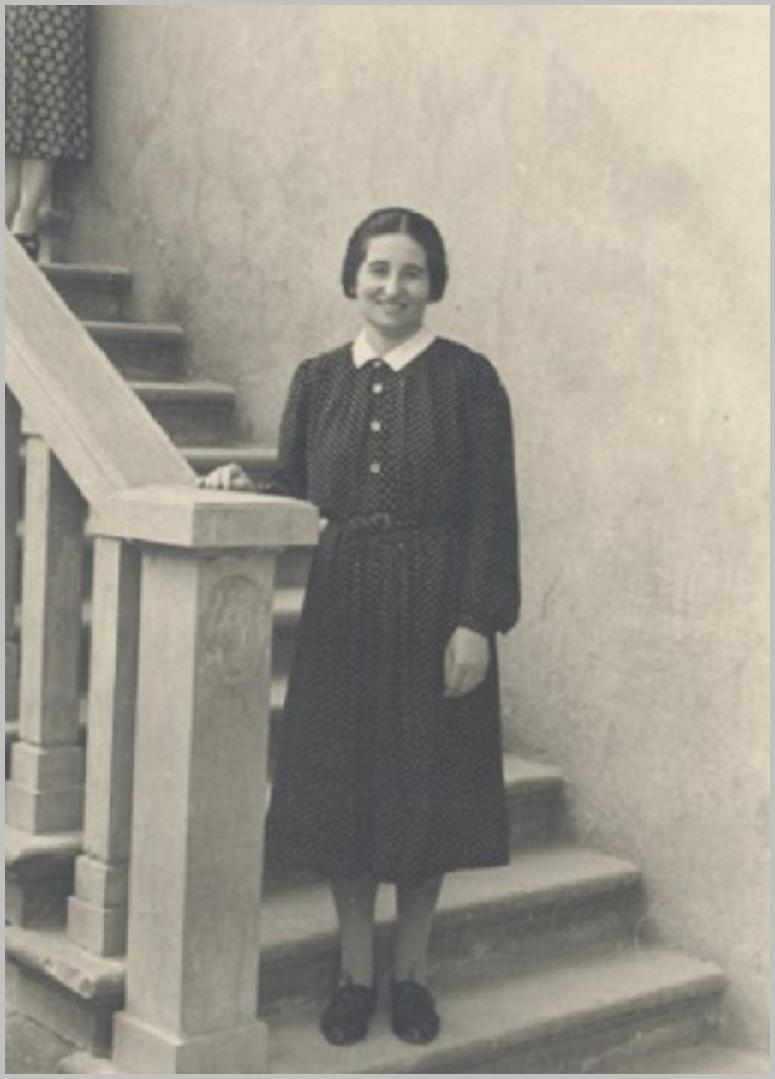
Pierina Gilli, the Italian visionary of Our Lady Rosa Mystica.

Pierina Gilli (August 3, 1911 – January 12, 1991), was an Italian visionary who claimed to receive apparitions and messages from the Virgin Mary in 1947 and 1966. The Marian apparitions were originally determined by the local ordinary, after consultation with the Congregation for the Doctrine of the Faith (CDF), to be lacking in sufficient evidence of credibility. However, a process of review which began in 2013 and is ongoing as of 2022 has reached a provisional finding of the 'validity and exemplarity of the mystical-spiritual experience of Pierina, as well as the richness of her existential, humble and virtuous story.' Having reached a favourable view of the person of the visionary, the diocese is conducting a review of the theology of Pierina's writings in the light of Catholic teaching.

Pierina was born in the municipality of Montichiari which is located in the Brescia province of the Lombardy region in northern Italy. She died there when she was 79 years old. She is mainly known as the seer who claimed the Blessed Virgin Mary revealed herself as Rosa Mystica; the message focused on Our Lady's motherly care for her deeply beloved consecrated souls of priests and of male and female members of religious institutes within the Roman Catholic Church.

== Childhood ==
Pierina Gilli was born on August 3, 1911, in the San Giorgio section of the northern Italian municipality of Montichiari. Her parents, Pancrazio Gilli and Rosa Bartoli, had three children, of which Pierina was the eldest. Her family was poor, as her father worked as a daily hired farm-worker. Due to its limited household income, the family often moved to various residences in Montichiari.

When Pierina was seven years old her father, died, leaving her mother to support the three children. Between 1918 and 1922, Pierina was placed in a Montichiari orphanage, conducted by the sisters of the Handmaids of Charity. This experience had a lasting impact on Pierina. Pierina received her First Holy Communion in the orphanage when she was eight.

Pierina returned to her family to assist her mother with the care of her two younger siblings, at the age of 11. At age 12, her mother (who was now remarried), and eight siblings moved to live in a cottage with her step-family. Pierina claimed she had received inappropriate attention from her step-father. Although not wishing to introduce any discord into these two families that were now living together, Pierina eventually confided everything to her mother. Partly due to that trauma, Pierina decided to consider a vocation in the religious life at age seventeen. Her confessor advised her to wait, in order to further discern any genuine religious calling to the consecrated life.

Despite all of Pierina's troubles, a soothing glimpse of her caring and devout family upbringing can be observed by this early childhood reminiscence from Pierina's diary: "I was the first of nine children, I the first to be delighted in the joy, the bliss, and the caresses of my parents. The day of 3 August 1911 was the dawn of my earthly coming, and I was baptized on August 5, the feast of the Madonna of the Snow; on that given day, my Mamma consecrated me to the true Mamma in Heaven, so that her maternal protection would preserve me as white and pure as snow.".

== Young Adulthood ==
At eighteen, Pierina worked as a children's assistant at a communal nursery school in Montichiari. When she was twenty years old, a marriage proposal was made to her by an honest and well-intentioned young man. For two months Pierina intimately suffered so much, because she did not feel herself to be called to the married life, but rather, she felt that the Lord wanted her totally for Himself. Her confessor finally spoke concerning her most genuine thoughts, thus confirming her vocation. Pierina was initially accepted as a postulant by the religious sisters' community of the Handmaids of Charity, but this soon had to be set aside for the first time by Pierina due to her health problems, including pleurisy, that persisted for several months. Instead, Pierina sought employment, and she worked for about seven years (from age 20 to 26: from 1931 to 1937) as a domestic servant of Father Giuseppe Brochini, and as caretaker of his elderly (frail and blind) mother, in the nearby small town of Carpenedolo.

Pierina then focused on obtaining her nursing license at the "White Villa" Care Home (managed by the Sisters of Charity of St. Antida Thouret) in the city of Brescia. Subsequently, starting at age 29, and throughout the four years of World War II (1941–1945), she worked as a licensed nurse's aide in the Civil Hospital (managed by the Handmaids of Charity) in the smaller city of Desenzano del Garda, located on the southern shore of Lake Garda, within sight of the north Italian Alps.

== Apparitions of Sister Maria Crocifissa Di Rosa ==
Sister Maria Crocifissa Di Rosa (Mary Crucified of the Rose) was the foundress of the congregation of the Handmaids of Charity. She died in 1855, and was canonized a saint on June 12, 1954, by Pope Pius XII.

On April 14, 1944, Pierina, then 32 years old, was accepted as a postulant by the Handmaids of Charity. She never attained the profession of final religious vows at this religious institute. Even so, this congregation of women deeply influenced her spiritual growth during her formative years, continuing well into her later life. She was subsequently assigned as a nurse at the Children's Hospital in the city of Brescia. On December 1, 1944, Pierina contracted meningitis, and was taken to her religious order's infirmary in Ronco for infectious isolation and medical treatment. The infirmary was located in a tiny section of the small Alpine village of Corteno Golgi, in the Brescia province. After twelve days in a comatose state Pierina was administered the Last Rites. Pierina recorded that beginning December 17, 1944, Sister Maria Crocifissa Di Rosa began to appear to her. Sister Maria held a vial of ointment that was given to her by Our Lady, and she anointed Pierina, saying comfortingly to her: "You will be cured, but you will have a heavy cross to bear."

On November 2, 1946, Pierina was stricken by an intestinal occlusion and was again taken to the Civil Hospital in the Montichiari. During the night of November 23–24, 1946, Blessed Maria Crocifissa appeared to her again. Also, for the first time, the Madonna appeared, as described in Pierina's diary: "Then I see the most beautiful Lady, as if transparent, dressed in purple with a white veil that descends from her head to her feet; she held her arms open, and I saw three swords piercing her heart." Our Lady did not speak to, nor converse with, Pierina at that time.

A few months later, on March 12, 1947, after suffering heart failure followed by renal colic, Pierina had to be admitted again to the Civil Hospital of Montichiari, where she lost consciousness, She was assisted by her congregational sisters as well as by her mother and sisters, who feared that she might die. Again, Pierina convalesced slowly. During the month of May 1947, Pierina was subjected to diabolical vexations and experienced a vision of Hell.

== Apparitions of Mary the Mystical Rose ==
Rosa Mystica Mystical Rose – Mother of the Church
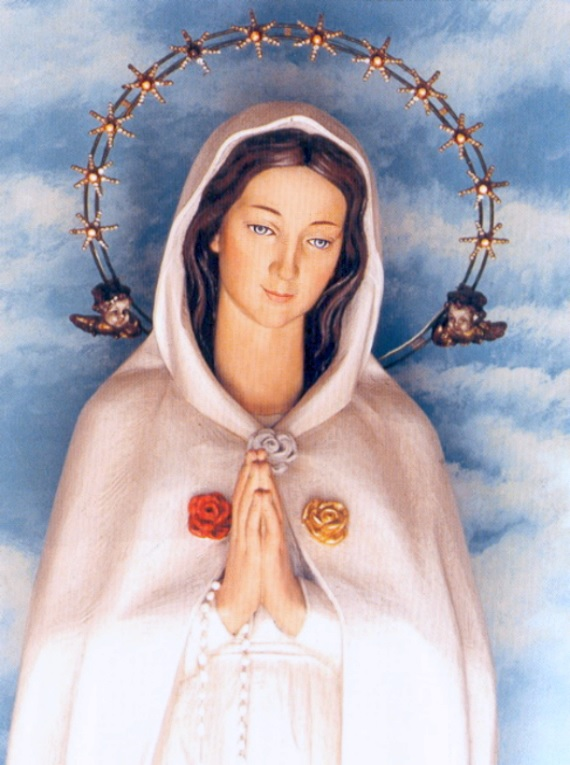
- The statue of Virgin Mary under the title of Mystical Rose enshrined within the chapel of Montichiari-Fontanelle (Italy) apparitions
- Location: Montichiari and Fontanelle (Italy)
- Date: 1947–1966
- Witness: Pierina Gilli
- Type: Marian apparition
- Shrine: Sanctuary of Mystical Rose – Mother of the Church
- Attributes: The Blessed Virgin Mary featuring three swords, or three roses in red, white and yellow.
- Feast day: July 13 (feast day); December 8 (at noon, the so-called "Hour of Universal Grace")

=== 1947: First Cycle of Marian Apparitions at Montichiari ===
In the summer of 1947, Pierina again witnessed apparitions of Sister Maria, with daily visions of her from June 11 to July 12, 1947, as well as a second apparition of the Blessed Virgin Mary with three swords piercing her Immaculate Heart. It was at 3:15 am on the night of 1 June 1947, during the recitation of the Rosary, when the Madonna said just three words to her: "Preghiera, Sacrificio, Penitenza" (Prayer, Sacrifice, Penance). Pierina recovered once more. Pierina had offered her sufferings for the sanctification of Roman Catholic consecrated souls (namely, for the priests and for members of male and female religious institutes, as listed in the Holy See's Pontifical Yearbook, in Italian, Annuario Pontificio).

Then, on July 13, 1947, there occurred the first "grand" apparition. As noted in Pierina's diary, the Blessed Virgin Mary was accompanied by the Blessed Sister Maria Crocifissa Di Rosa; and Our Lady appeared in a splendidly different manner: in a white dress and with a white cape around her head that reached to the floor; the three swords were on the floor, and on the chest of the Virgin were three roses: one white, one red, and one gold. She explained to Pierina,

I am the Mother of Jesus and the Mother of all of you. Our Lord sends me to bring a new Marian devotion for all male and female institutes, religious orders, and secular priests. I promise those religious institutes, orders and secular priests who venerate me in this special way my special protection, an increase of spiritual vocations, few betrayed vocations, and great sanctity among the servants of God. I wish the 13th day of each month to be celebrated as the day of Mary. On the 12 preceding days, special prayers of preparation should be said.

According to Pierina, Mary then explained to the meaning of the three swords and the three roses. The first sword means loss of the vocation as a priest or a monk. The second sword means priests, monks, and nuns who live in deadly sin. The third sword means priests and monks who while giving up their vocation, often lose also their faith, and become enemies of the Church. The white rose means the spirit of prayer. The red rose means the spirit of expiation and sacrifice. The yellow or golden rose means the spirit of penitence. Additionally, on these first thirteen days of every month, Mary asked for the prayerful observance of the following four long-standing Roman Catholic devotional practices: the Holy Mass, the Holy Communion, the Holy Rosary, and the Holy Hour of Eucharistic Adoration.

Notable developments therefore took place on June 1 and July 13. The first development is that the initially silent Madonna (first appearing on the night of November 23–24, 1946) becomes the speaking Madonna (from 1 June 1947). The second is one of appearance: the sorrowful and tearful Madonna dressed in purple (reported by Pierina on the night of 23–24 November 1946 and again on 1 June 1947) gives way to the white-clad Rosa Mystica from 13 July 1947, when Mary appears in a white dress and long white cape, with three roses: white, red, and gold, adorning her Immaculate Heart.

Later in that same year, on October 22, 1947, at 7:00 pm, while the Rosary was being recited by Pierina and others in the chapel of the Montichiari hospital of Pierina's religious order where she was serving as a nurse, Pierina saw a luminous ray of light emanating from the tabernacle to a nearby statue of Blessed Sister Maria Crocifissa Di Rosa holding a crucifix. She saw the statue of Sister Maria and the figure on the Crucifix seemed to become animated; Pierina rose up and knelt in front of the statue, and, from the crucifix in its hands, were emerging drops of blood, which Pierina wiped dry with the purification cloth from the altar, as instructed by her holy foundress.

The Blessed Sister Maria then spoke grievingly to Pierina: "See how much blood is lost uselessly"; and next the holy foundress pleadingly asked Pierina to recite the following prayer: "My Jesus, mercy, pardon our sins." Then, Mary the Mystical Rose appeared, announcing her final visitation to the premises of the Handmaids of Charity, by saying to Pierina:

For the last time I come to request the devotion already recommended at other times. My divine Son wanted to leave proof by his most precious Blood in order to witness how great is his love for all humanity, from which is returned such great offenses. Get the purification cloth, and show it to all here present. Behold, the drops of blood of the Lord. Let it be covered by a white cloth, and then let it be exposed for three days in this chapel, together with the statute of Sister Maria Crocifissa Di Rosa that will become miraculous for the sake of the devotion of the faithful. Have the coming factual test be referred to the Bishop, and say to him that conversions and revival of faith will verify it. I interpose myself as Mediatrix between all human beings and particularly for religious souls and my divine Son who, tired of continuously receiving offenses, wanted to exercise His justice. I vitally desire that this Institute of the Handmaids of Charity may be the first to honor me with the title of Mystical Rose.

After a silent pause, Mary the Mystical Rose stretched open her arms and white mantle as a gesture and a sign of her protection, revealing again the three roses upon her chest, and saying sweetly to Pierina: "Live for the sake of love!", as Our Lady slowly disappeared from sight.

=== Latter 1947: Second Cycle of Marian Apparitions at Montichiari's Minor Basilica ===
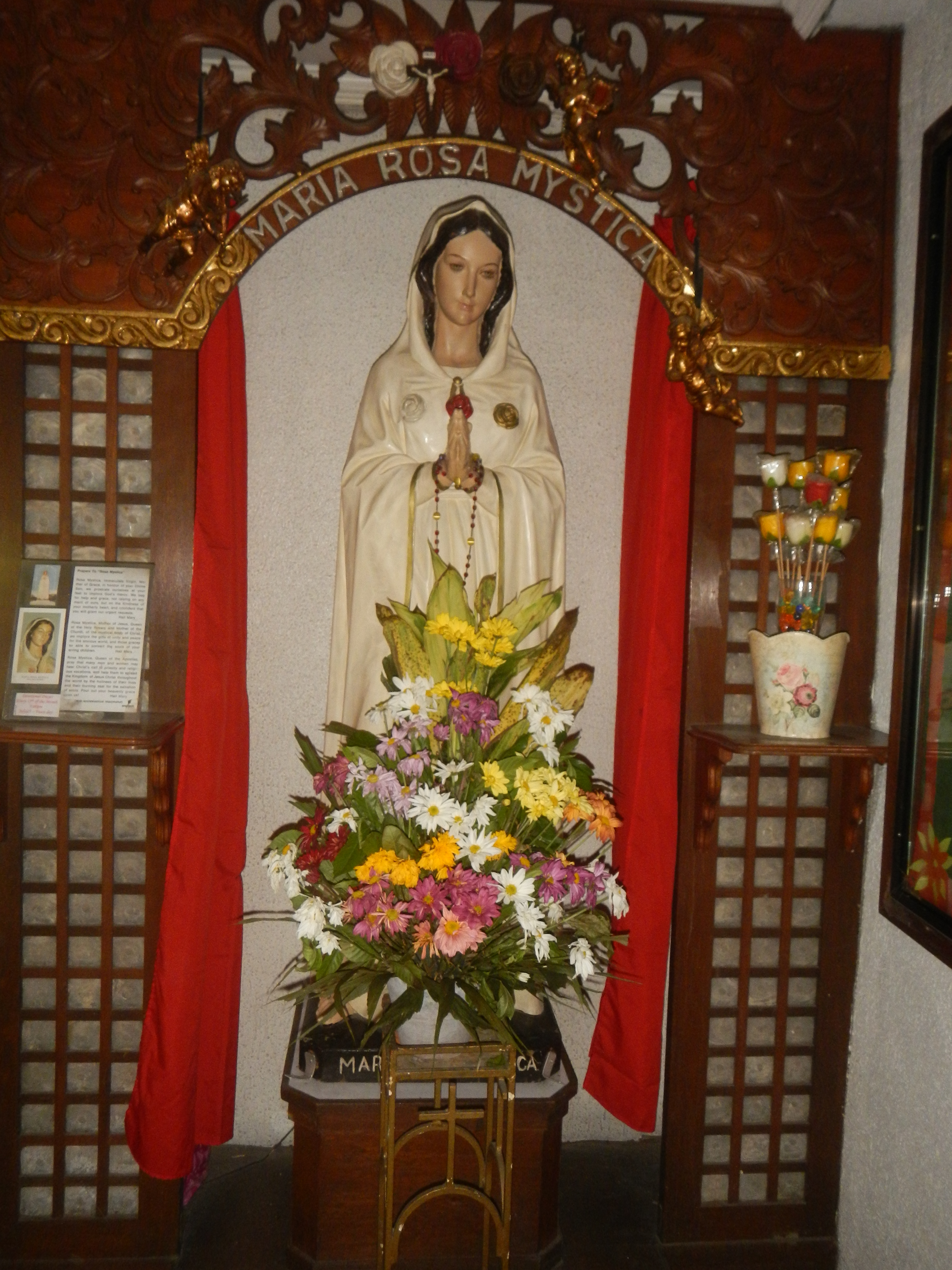
A devotional statue of Virgin Mary under the title of Rosa Mystica

Successive apparitions of Mary the Mystical Rose would then occur to Pierina, while at the Duomo of Montichiari, a minor basilica, dedicated to the Blessed Virgin Mary under her title as Saint Mary of the Assumption. According to Pierina, at the first such event in Montichiari's minor basilica of Saint Mary of the Assumption, on November 16, 1947, while Pierina was praying in thanksgiving after having attended the 7:00 a.m. Sunday Mass, it was near the altar in a wonderful light the Madonna appeared in the midst of a garden of white and red and golden roses.

She asked Pierina to make, as an act of reparational humility, the sign of the Cross with her tongue on four tiles in the center of the basilica's floor. She requested prayer and sacrifice and penitence in reparation for the numerous offenses of humanity to the Lord. Pierina asked the Madonna if she would take her to heaven; Our Lady smiled and said to Pierina: "If you can be generous, then many graces can be obtained for the whole world." Then, the Mystical Rose delicately joined together her hands in prayer, slowly turning away and distancing herself into a waning light.

Next, during an interior locution to Pierina while praying in her hospital's chapel at mid-day on November 22, 1947, the Blessed Virgin Mary summoned her to meet at the Montichiari minor basilica at 4:00 p.m.; after conferring with her sister superior, Pierina, accompanied by five of her religious community's sisters, went to the basilica, where a few priests were already present. While they were reciting the Rosary, in a descending and increasingly luminous light Mary the Mystical Rose, surrounded by a tapestry of roses, appeared to Pierina, saying: "I have come down to this place because here will be great conversions." Then, Our Lady specifically pre-announced that her upcoming visitation to this basilica would occur on December 8 the feast day of the Immaculate Conception, at 12:00 noon, in order to solemnly request the Hour of Grace.

On Sunday, December 7, 1947, the eve of the feast of the Immaculate Conception, while Pierina was being visited by and conversing with some relatives at her hospital, she received an inner locution to come quickly to the Montichiari basilica. Taking leave of her relatives and going to her superior Mother Luigia Romanin, they proceeded to the basilica, along with Pierina's priest confessor Father Luigi Bonomini: they prayed the Miserere and were just beginning to recite the Rosary, when in a flash of light the Madonna appeared, beautiful and smiling, with two small angelic children (a boy clasping her right hand and a girl clasping her left hand, both dressed in shining white robes and headbands: they were identified as the Fatima children, by Mary the Mystical Rose). Our Lady spoke to Pierina Gilli, addressing her and her mother superior Luigia Romanin and her priest confessor Father Luigi Bonomini:

"I have come to bring graces and blessings to the three of you, for the work and sacrifices that you have done for my intentions." She confided some secrets to Pierina, and then with a penetrating glance said to her: "Tomorrow at noon I shall come and show you a smallest part of Paradise. ... Tomorrow I will show you my Immaculate Heart, so little known by humanity. At Fatima I made known the devotion of consecration to my Heart. At Bonate I sought to make this penetrate into Christian families. Instead here at Montichiari I desire to deeply enkindle the Mystical Rose devotion; united with the devotion to my Heart, it comes profoundly into religious institutes, so that religious souls may draw abundant graces from my maternal Heart. With this apparition for the sanctification of religious souls, I close the cycle of such apparitions."

Pierina Gilli as an adult

The Virgin Mary promised that she would continue to provide special graces for the Handmaids of Charity, and she also specifically requested prayers (as at Fatima) for the conversion of Russia, whose soldiers were affecting the tranquility and peace of Russia itself and of many nations, and particularly of Italy at that time. Thus, on December 7, 1947, accompanied by Francisco and Jacinta Marto, the two youngest of the three famous Marian visionary shepherd children of Fátima, Portugal, Mary had reappeared, explaining to the visionary Pierina as she wrote in her diary about these two heavenly children who were entrusted to her: "They will be your companions in every tribulation. They also have suffered, although much younger than you."

Pierina was discouraged and even pressured by numerous persons, including Monsignor Agostino Gazzoli, representing the Bishop of the Brescia diocese, from going to the Montichiari minor basilica at the time appointed (the noon hour of December 8, 1947) by the Blessed Virgin Mary. As the mid-day hour approached, Pierina, even though reproved and given injunctions by some authoritative ecclesiastical figures who tried mightily to dissuade her, decisively said, at 11:30 a.m. on December 8, 1947: "Now it is necessary that I go." Pierina would have preferred to have been accompanied by her supportive mother and the sister superior of her hospital, but she hastily reached the destination on her own, arriving at Montichiari's minor basilica of Saint Mary of the Assumption, just at the noon hour.

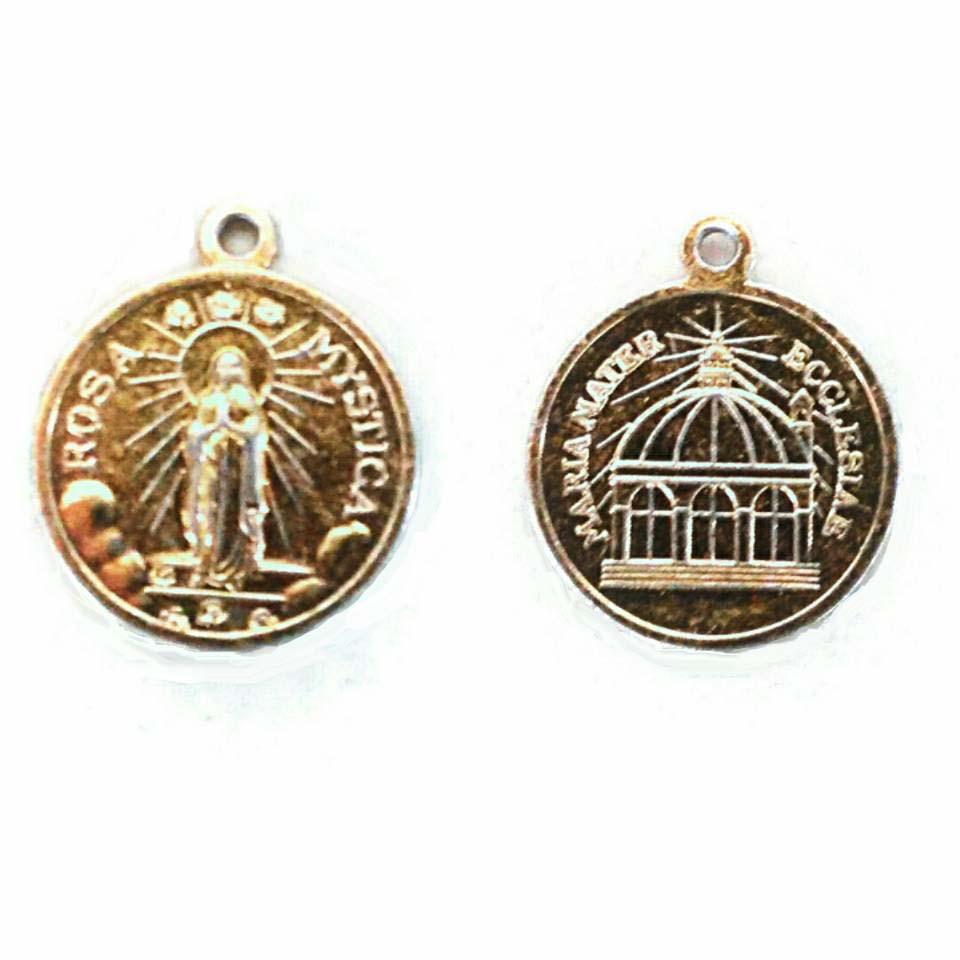
The devotional medal of Maria Rosa Mystica – Mater Ecclesiae

The Virgin Mary appeared to Pierina in the Montichiari basilica, where about a thousand persons were attending Mass for the feast of the Immaculate Conception. Pierina sees Mary descending a wide staircase, beautifully lined with numerous white and red and gold roses, to the center of the basilica's floor; and she purportedly says to Pierina: "I am the Immaculate Conception. I am Mary of Grace, the Mother of my Divine Son Jesus Christ. By my coming to the Clear Mountains (Montichiari), I desire to be called the Mystical Rose. Furthermore my desire is to see instituted the Hour of Grace for the whole world, by celebrating it on December 8th of every year, in order to obtain graces and conversions; and to request the construction of railings for the custody of these cited four floor tiles, together with a statue that replicates the Mystical Rose."

And then, as Pierina saw the Madonna's Immaculate Heart, there allegedly occurred two miraculous cures, regarding a paralyzed child and a mute woman. These two healings involved: a young boy Ugo Senici about six years old, having suffered from polio and not being able to stand or to walk (who suddenly ran around and jumped up and down excitedly); and a 26-year-old woman Teresina Magli, having suffered for nine years from severe tuberculosis and not being able to speak even a word (who suddenly sang out a spontaneous song of praise in a loud voice). A third miraculous cure also happened during the same time as the other two, involving a mentally disturbed 36-year-old woman, Lauriana Zamboni, who was healed at home while her family members were praying for her inside Montichiari's minor basilica.

After these episodes at Montichiari's minor basilica of Saint Mary of the Assumption, Pierina was soon investigated and closely interrogated by the diocesan ecclesiastical authorities. Subsequently, she secluded herself, at age 38 years, on May 20, 1949, at the convent of the Franciscan Sisters of the Holy Child in Brescia, Italy. She did not become a member of that religious order.

Pierina stayed at this convent for 19 years, rendering her nursing services to this community of religious sisters, even though Pierina herself sometimes needed to be cared for. Pierina then found that the Marian apparitions occurred very rarely for a long time, but they were to return newly intensified in 1966.

=== 1966: Third Cycle of Marian Apparitions at Fontanelle ===
According to the testimony of Francesca (Franca) Dal Ri Cornado (1924–1993: foundress of the [Roman Catholic] Charismatic Movement of Assisi, in Brescia, Italy), the apparitions of Gilli were resumed as a requested sign by their mutual spiritual director, Fr. Giustino Carpin, O.F.M.Conv., in order to verify the interior locutions that Cornado had been receiving since 1958. Reportedly, Fr. Carpin had invited Coronado, without entering into any details, to ask for an especial grace from the Lord – and the grace was exactly that his other spiritual daughter Gilli would see again the Virgin Mary, who had promised to newly manifest herself without specifying when and where. Over time, Fr. Carpin and Gilli became close friends.

On February 27, 1966, Mary indicated to Gilli (then almost 55 years old) that she would appear on April 17, 1966, the Second Sunday of Easter (i.e., the Octave day of Easter, Domenica in albis or “Low Sunday”), near a spring of water located at Fontanelle (“Little Fountains”) about three kilometers from the center of Montichiari, in the direction of Carpenedolo. The Virgin Mary communicated the following message, pertaining to the small stairway leading down to the spring, as recorded in Gilli’s diary: "My Divine Son Jesus is all love. He has invited me to render miraculous this spring. As a sign of penance and of purification, give a kiss to the (top) step, then go down a few steps, stop, then give another kiss and go down further. For a third time, give again a kiss to the (bottom) step, and here can be placed the Crucifix. The sick and all my children, before taking and drinking the water, should ask pardon from my Divine Son."

In her second apparition at Fontanelle on May 13, 1966, the 49th anniversary of the first apparition of Our Lady of Fátima, the Virgin Mary conveyed to Pierina to call the spring "The Font of Grace", inviting humanity to prayer, to sacrifice, and to penance.

The third apparition was on June 9, 1966, the Feast of Corpus Christi. The Virgin Mary expressed her desire, according to which a part of the grain from the nearby fields would be transformed into "the Eucharistic Bread" and brought to Fátima on October 13. Moreover, she would express also her desire that the people of Montichiari would consecrate themselves to her Immaculate Heart.

In her fourth and last apparition at Fontanelle on August 6, 1966, the Feast of the Transfiguration of Jesus, the Virgin Mary would request the institution of "the World Union of Reparative Communion", to be held on October 13 (the anniversary of the last Fátima apparition and the Dancing Sun); additionally, her function as the Mediatrix between her Son and humanity was recorded, by adjoining: "I have chosen this place of Montichiari because in its children that work the soil, there is still humility as in a poor Bethlehem."

Since then at Fontanelle there has been established the Shrine of Mary, the Mystical Rose (Italian: Santuario di Maria Rosa Mistica), which is sometimes also referred to as "the little Lourdes of Italy" ("la piccola Lourdes italiana"). Even the Virgin Mary said to Gilli on May 19, 1970, "Montichiari can be a second Lourdes."

== Last Years ==
Pierina began a very reclusive life from the late 1960s onwards, living simply and prayerfully in a donated little, humble house with a small prayer chapel, making herself available at her private home (in Montichiari's section or "frazione", called Boschetti, which in English means "the little forests"), to visitors coming on pilgrimage to Fontanelle (and to the Montichiari minor basilica. The last recorded Marian apparition occurred on March 24, 1983, to Pierina, being 71 years old, in her Boschetti home when Mary expressed her desire to see the realization of a special Marian Sanctuary with five cupolas in Montichiari, and specifically requested that progress be made in producing a Mystical Rose Sanctuary medal according to her instructions.

Pierina Gilli, at the age of 79, died on January 12, 1991, at Montichiari, in the Boschetti section.

After Pierina's death, during the 1990s and 2000s (decade), despite the local Brescia diocese's generally unsupportive historical stance, some 40 reported apparitions of Our Lady, a few times as the sorrowful Madonna, though mostly as Mary the Mystical Rose; as recorded in Pierina Gilli's diaries.

The number of visitors coming to Fontanelle and Montichiari increased sufficiently that in 2001, two priests were assigned in regard to the spiritual care of the pilgrims.

In relation to Montichiari and to Fontanelle, the spiritual conversions and the miraculous cures and the liberation from diabolical possessions are still continuing, accompanied by other supernatural signs, such as (for examples) solar prodigies and luminous crosses in the sky. Sociologist Bruno Massaro has researched the apparitions, and has written a book on his findings The Case of Pierina Gilli of Montichiari (2003).

La Madre della Chiesa, Rosa Mistica: Fatima, Bonate, Montichiari: Le Anime, La Famiglia, La Chiese (The Mother of the Church, the Mystical Rose: Fatima, Bonate, Montichiari: The Souls, The Family, The Church), is a book compiled by Father Eligio Garbo, which informs mostly about the Montichiari apparitions.

== Positions of the Roman Catholic Church ==
The following five pronouncements were made over the course of several decades by the Roman Catholic Diocese of Brescia as cited by Kevin Symonds and Alfredo Tradigo:

1. Communicated by the Episcopal Curia on June 30, 1968: "The Monsignor Bishop vividly exhorts all the faithful that they declare themselves respectful to the directives of the Church not to favor either by publications or by pilgrimages the spreading of devotions that are founded upon a non-approved interpretation of facts neither objectively controlled nor responsibly evaluated."
2. Communicated by Monsignor Luigi Morstabilini on November 25, 1975: "The Monsignor Bishop renews the firm invitation to the faithful and to the clergy because by their obsequious acceptance of preceding decisions they might find at other sanctuaries and places recognized by the Church the better form to experience the right and necessary devotion to the Mother of God according to more authentic contents of faith and of Catholic spirituality."
3. Declaration of Monsignor Bruno Foresti on October 15, 1984: "The Bishop of Brescia supported by the authoritative opinion of the Sacred Congregation for the Doctrine of the Faith, communicates that (a) the aforementioned apparitions of Our Lady the Mystical Rose in Montichiari do not present motives of credibility; (b) the cult relative to Our Lady the Mystical Rose, therefore, is not approved and can not be practiced nor favored; (c) whosoever favors it, by spreading publications or by organizing pilgrimages, does not help, but disturbs the faith of believers by inducing them to behave contrary to the disposition of the Church."
4. Declaration of Monsignor Bruno Foresti on February 19, 1997: "The Bishop of Brescia holding accountable some various solicitations that come continuously requested in merit, both from Italy and from external nations, reconfirms that which was disposed by him and by his predecessors."
5. In the attachment to Decree number 229/08 by Monsignor Luciano Munari on March 19, 2008, at point 2 is read: "In a particular way there is explicitly asked of individuals and of groups, that until now are more or less directly dedicated to promote the Marian cult in the Fontanelle locality, to respect all the indications of the Directory, and not to spread the messages or publications, neither to promote the acts of the cult, nor to send compositions that might even only indirectly induce the faithful to restrain both the judgment and the Church on the aforementioned apparitions or other extraordinary phenomena, even as may be modified in a positive sense."

The Brescia diocesan bishops' have repeatedly clarified that the alleged apparitions have not been approved, and discouraged the premature promotion of the cultus, while at the same time making provision for the spiritual care of those who nonetheless go there. Bishop Giulio Sanguineti appointed on May 5, 2001, Monsignor Piero Boselli, Director of the Liturgical Office of the Diocesan Curia, as the Presider of a constituted Committee, "with the purpose of watching over the devotional manifestations, while avoiding what might rest entrusted to the arbitrariness of occasional (casual) and passing-through priests"; moreover, "Responsible for the activities and for the judgment of Marian devotions is the diocesan Bishop only, in which the singular care directed on the part of the Diocese can avoid the possible multiplications of episodes tending to reinforce some simple convictions around presumed extraordinary phenomena. This responsibility is necessarily retained also to avoid slightly illuminated devotional practices and certain forms of tendentious preachings."

In July 2013, the Diocese of Brescia again updated the Directory regulating worship at the apparition sites. In short, Our Lady can be honoured under the title Rosa Mystica because this is an ancient title of the Madonna; but no reference may be made during official activities to the alleged visions and their messages.

In 2014, an official decree of the Diocese of Brescia erected the "Foundation Rosa Mystica Fontanelle" as the Church's official organisation to care for the property and activities at Fontanelle. It is noteworthy that the cycle of monthly and annual events include all the particular devotions (13th day of each month, and special activities on 13 July, 13 October and 8 December) which can be found in the alleged revelations. While the new Foundation's mission is not to promote the alleged messages of Pierina Gilli, and stresses that her claims must currently be considered as being "a pure personal experience", their website does nevertheless refer to them by necessity when explaining why the shrine came to be.

On 7 December 2019, Bishop Tremolda (Bishop of Brescia since 2017) instituted an official sanctuary of Our Lady Rosa Mystica at the apparition site in Fontanelle. In a letter issued 21 November 2019, the new bishop recognises that many thousands of pilgrims have come to this place to honour Our Lady, and is cautiously optimistic that this is a healthy devotion for the Christian faithful. His letter acknowledges that judging the fruits of the devotion is as important as weighing up Pierina's claims in judging this spiritual phenomenon. He also mentions that there is a 'renewed phase' of investigation taking place, with the Diocese of Brescia and the Vatican's Congregation for the Doctrine of the Faith continuing to evaluate the claims.

On July 5, 2024, the Dicastery for the Doctrine of the Faith issued a statement approving of the apparitions and of devotion to the Blessed Virgin Mary under the title of "Rosa Mystica". In a letter sent to the Bishop of Brescia, Cardinal Víctor Manuel Fernández said that the “spiritual proposal that emerges from the experiences narrated by Pierina Gilli in relation to María Rosa Mystica does not contain theological or moral elements contrary to the doctrine of the Church.” This determination was given in light of the "Norms for Proceeding in the Discernment of Alleged Supernatural Phenomena" issued by the DDF in May of the same year.

== Bibliography ==
- Monsignor Enrico Rodolfo Galbiati, Maria Rosa Mistica: Madre della Chiesa; Sottotitolo: Le apparizioni della Madonna a Fontanelle-Montichiari (Mary the Mystical Rose: Mother of the Church; Subtitle: The Apparitions of Our Lady at Fontanelle-Montichiari), Curatori (Editors): Rosanna Brichetti Messori and Riccardo Caniato, Editore Ares, Milan (Italy), 2008. Published in Italian, 248 pages. ISBN 978-88-8155-422-5.
- Garbo, Father Eligio (1975). 'La Madre della Chiesa, Rosa Mistica: Fatima, Bonate, Montichiari: Le Anime, La Famiglia, La Chiese [The Mother of the Church, the Mystical Rose: Fatima, Bonate, Montichiari: The Souls, The Family, The Church] (in Italian). Rome: Propaganda Mariana.
- Bruno Massaro, Il caso Pierina Gilli di Montichiari (The case of Pierina Gilli of Montichiari), Editore Starrylink, Brescia (Italy), 2003. Published in Italian, 208 pages. ISBN 88-88847-30-8.
- Franz Speckbacher, Novena to the Rosa Mystica, Mediatrix-Verlag, Zishkin & Co. GmbH, A-3423 St. Andra-Worden (Austria), 1986. Published in German, Italian, French, and English. English edition, 48 pages. ISBN 3-85406-082-3.
- Father Alfons Maria Weigl, Maria, "Rosa Mistica": Montichiari-Fontanelle (Mary, "Mystical Rose": Montichiari-Fontanelle), Libreria Propaganda Mariana, Roma, 1974 (German and Italian Editions); reprinted in 1982 (English Edition, 200 pages). ASIN: B000ANNR3E. First American Edition (208 pages), distributed by Fr. John Mario Starace, M.T.D. Printing (Brooklyn, N.Y.), 1984.
