= Maria Ripamonti =

Italian Roman Catholic and professed religious

Blessed Maria Ripamonti A.D.C.

Religious
- Born: 26 May 1909; Acquate, Lecco, Kingdom of Italy
- Died: 4 July 1954 (aged 45); Ronchettino Hospital, Ronco, Brescia, Italy
- Venerated in: Roman Catholic Church
- Beatified: 23 October 2021, Cathedral of Santa Maria Assunta, Brescia, Italy by Cardinal Marcello Semeraro
- Feast: 4 July
- Attributes: Religious habit

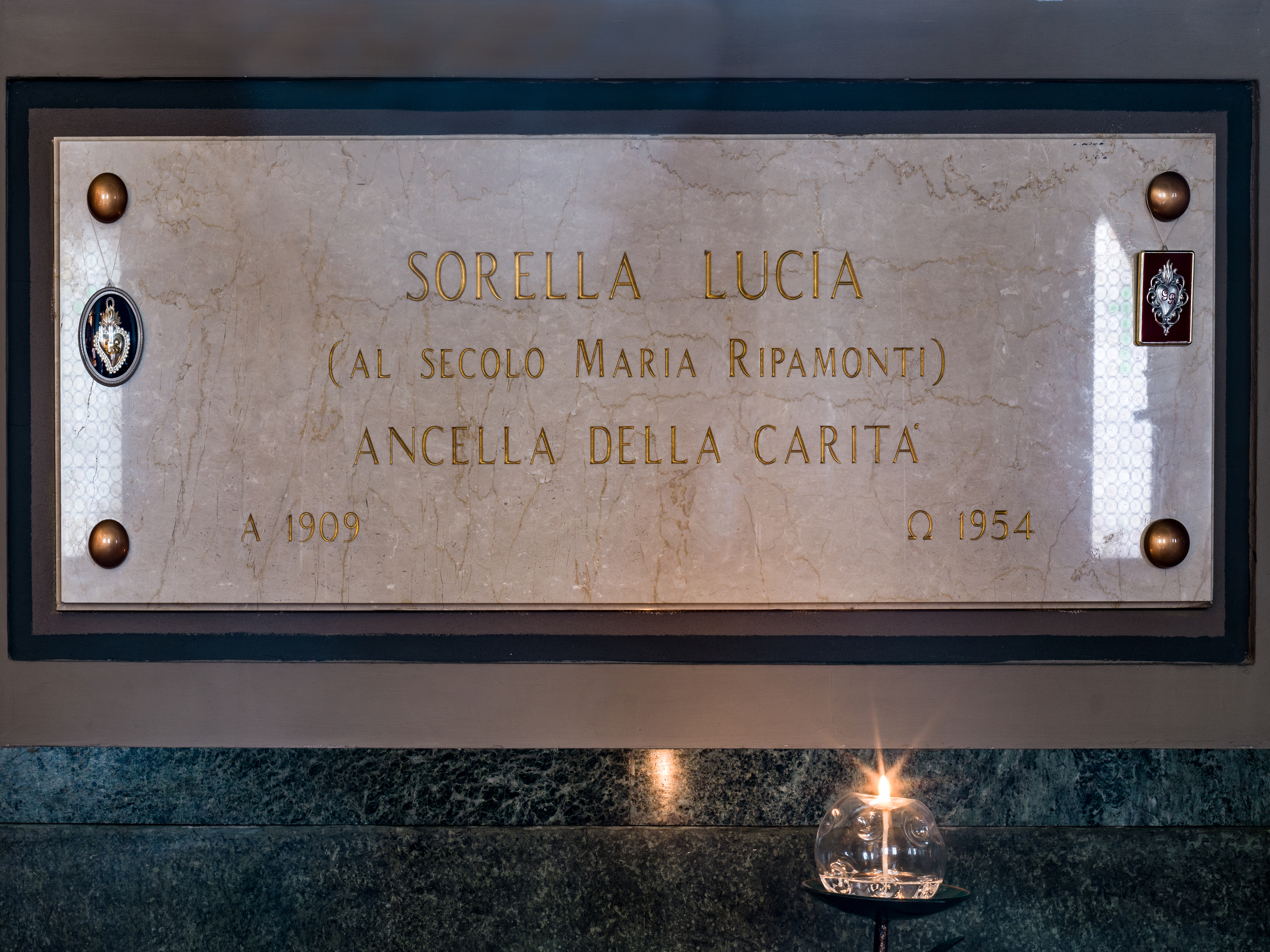
Memory plate dedicated to Maria Ripamonti in the Handmaids of Charity chapel in Brescia.

Maria Ripamonti (26 May 1909 – 4 July 1954), also known by her religious name Lucia dell'Immacolata, was an Italian Roman Catholic and a professed religious from the Ancelle della carità. Ripamonti worked at a spinning mill before leaving her hometown in 1932 for Brescia to enter a religious congregation after having met a visiting nun in her hometown. In 1938 she made her perpetual profession and started residing in the order's motherhouse in Brescia and was later diagnosed late with a serious illness that led to her death in 1954.

Her order after her death started to request for an official beatification process to be launched and this took place in the Brescia diocese in 1992 and she became titled as a Servant of God. Pope Francis later confirmed her to be Venerable in 2017 upon the acknowledgement of her life of heroic virtue; the same pope confirmed a miracle attributed to her intercession which shall enable for Ripamonti to be beatified in Brescia; it was scheduled to be held on 9 May 2020 but the COVID-19 pandemic forced its postponement. She was beatified on 23 October 2021.

== Life ==
Maria Ripamonti was born in Acquate in the province of Lecco on 26 May 1909 as the last of four children to Ferdinando Ripamonti; her baptism was celebrated on 30 May. Ripamonti made her First Communion in 1916 and then made her confirmation later in 1918. In her adolescence she began working in a spinning mill in order to support her siblings and was a frequent attendee at Mass while she also would tend to children and would collaborate with those in the Catholic Action movement for parish initiatives. The parish priest Luigi Piatti was a confidante of hers and would provide her with religious instruction and formation.

In 1932 she left for Brescia in order to be admitted into the Ancelle della carità after she met one of the order's religious in her hometown around that time. In 1938 she made her perpetual profession and assumed the religious name "Lucia dell'Immacolata" and started to live at the order's motherhouse in Brescia. Ripamonti was later diagnosed late with a serious illness and she began to offer herself to God as a victim for the reparation of souls while receiving treatment in hospital. Ripamonti had a deep devotion to Nostra Signora di Lourdes and would often serve the priests that visited the motherhouse to undergo the Spiritual Exercises. Her devotion also extended to the order's foundress, Maria Crocifissa di Rosa, who was canonized just under a month before Ripamonti died.

Ripamonti died in 1954 at the Ronchettino Hospital and her remains were interred in Brescia in the motherhouse's chapel.

== Beatification ==
The order's ninth Superior General Eugenia Menni made a formal request for the cause to be launched and the Brescia diocese started to prepare for the cause to be launched. The Congregation for the Causes of Saints issued the formal "nihil obstat" (no objections) decree on 1 December 1992 that titled Ripamonti as a Servant of God and allowed for the cause to be launched. The diocesan process was conducted in Brescia under Bishop Bruno Foresti and upon its closure was transferred to Rome where the C.C.S. would begin their own work on the cause; the congregation issued a decree on 10 November 1995 that validated the diocesan process.

Ripamonti became titled as Venerable on 27 February 2017 after Pope Francis signed a decree that acknowledged that Ripamonti had practiced heroic virtue throughout her life. The process to investigate a miracle attributed to her intercession (the prerequisite for her to be beatified) opened in the Bolzano-Brixen diocese on 7 August 2012 and closed just a few months later on 20 November. The miracle investigated was the 1967 healing of Irene Zanfino (then aged seven) who was involved in a near-fatal car crash. Pope Francis approved this miracle in a decree on 13 May 2019 that henceforth enables for Ripamonti to be beatified in Brescia; it was scheduled for 9 May 2020 but postponed due to the COVID-19 pandemic though later rescheduled and celebrated on 23 October 2021.

The current postulator for the cause is Paolisa Falconi who comes from Ripamonti's order.
