= Norms for Proceeding in the Discernment of Alleged Supernatural Phenomena =

2024 Catholic document

Norms for Proceeding in the Discernment of Alleged Supernatural Phenomena is a 2024 document written by the Holy See's Dicastery for the Doctrine of the Faith outlining the discernment process for claims of private revelation such as Marian apparitions. It supersedes the 1978 norms, which were less restrictive and deferred to local diocesan bishops for verifying alleged supernatural occurrences.

Under the new provisions, only the Pope retains the authority to declare if the phenomenon is supernatural, whilst bishops' rulings were made more neutral.

== History ==
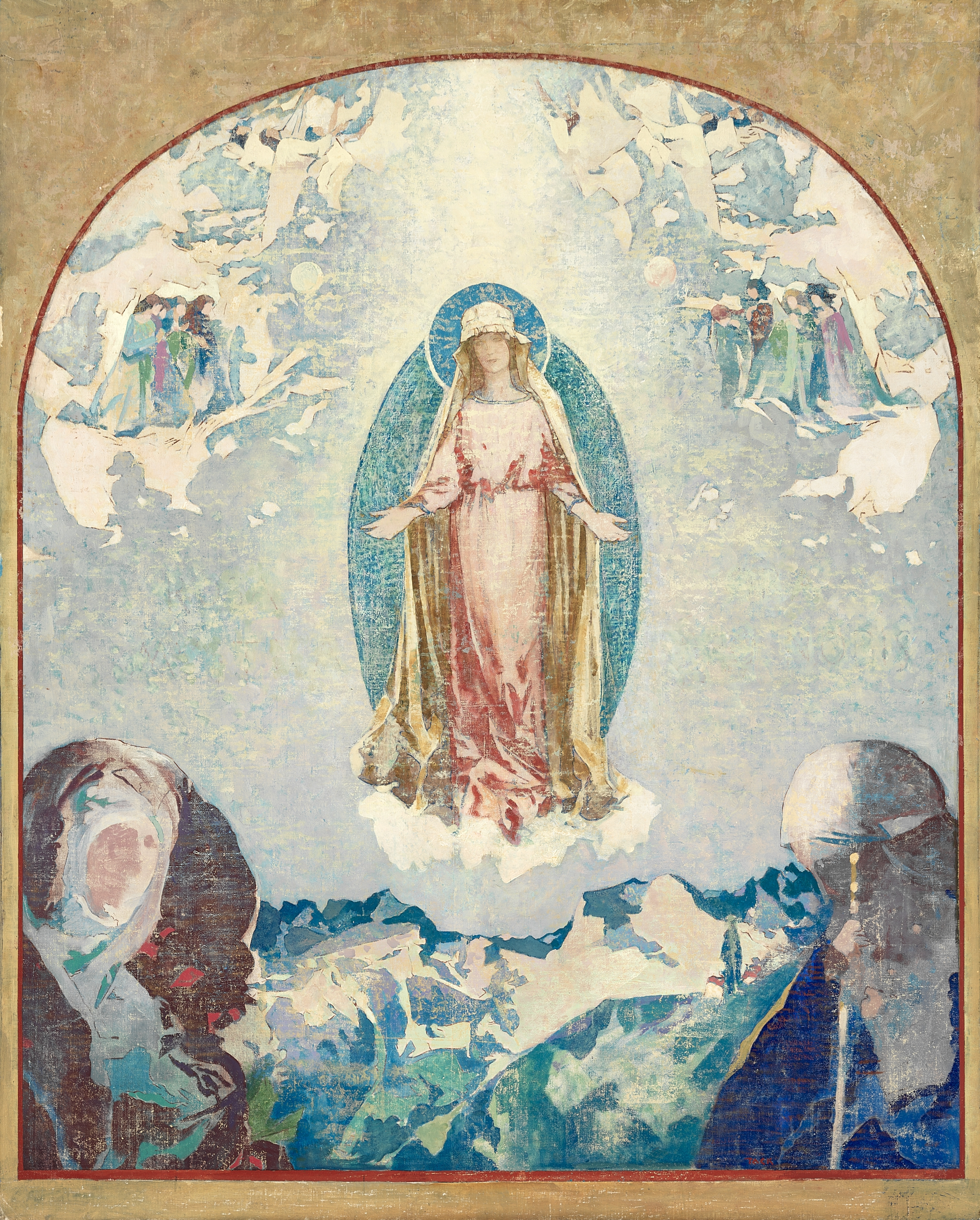
Augustus Vincent Tack's painting of the Rosa Mystica, a 19th-century apparition claimed by Pierina Gilli

Concerns regarding private revelations and their rapid dissemination through mass media prompted the Congregation for the Doctrine of the Faith to convene in November 1974 to formulate a discernment policy. On 28 February 1978, the Norms were announced with the approval of Pope Paul VI. The procedure was initiated by the diocesan bishop corresponding to the place of apparition, who would conduct an investigation and weigh against criteria to positively or negatively discern it, the former being designated as pro nunc nihil obstare ('for now, nothing stands in the way'). Further assessment could be requested from higher Church authorities, including the Holy See.

Concerns were renewed by the rise of social media, long procedure, and low resolution rates. One case cited by The New York Times was an alleged visionary whose claimed frequent messages at the weeping statue in Trevignano were denied by a local bishop, yet the statue remained a popular site.

In 2019, revisions of the 1978 norms began, but in 2023 it was determined a complete reform was necessary. The final version was completed in 2024 and presented to Pope Francis on 4 May.

On 17 May 2024, Cardinal Víctor Manuel Fernández, head of the Dicastery for the Doctrine of the Faith, revealed the updated norms, which took effect on 19 May 2024.

== Provisions ==
=== Possible decisions ===
Resolutions of the 2024 Norms
Latin Title	Translation
Nihil obstat	Nothing hinders
Prae oculis habeatur	Let it be held before the eyes
Curatur	It is to be taken care of
Sub mandato	Under mandate
Prohibetur et obstruatur	It is prohibited and blocked
Declaratio de non supernaturalitate	Declaration of non-supernaturality

=== Process ===
The process for discernment is initiated by the corresponding area's diocesan bishop in dialogue with the Dicastery. If the geographic scope extends beyond one diocese, an inter-diocesan commission may be established. The diocesan bishop(s), in collaboration with their national episcopal conference, formulates a decision, which is reviewed by the Dicastery for the Doctrine of the Faith. Investigation begins with the diocesan bishop collecting informative material and consulting all related bishops in determining pastoral effects. If a judgement is determined to beneficial in controlling the situation, an investigative commission composed of one theologian, canonist, and one expert on the related phenomena is formed. Then, evidence is weighed against criteria concerning the formation of a cult, social domination, and proper manifestation of piety.

Typically, nihil obstat, a precautionary (prae oculis habeatur, curatur, and sub mandato), or negative judgement (prohibetur et obstruatur and declaratio de non supernaturalitate) is decided explicitly "in agreement with the Dicastery". Positive discernment (constat de supernaturalitate), unlike the 1978 norms, is reserved for the Pope.

== Analysis ==
Cardinal Víctor Manuel Fernández expressed hope the new procedure would aid in a decision on Our Lady of Međugorje. In July, he further stated cases such as Our Lady of Guadalupe, Lourdes, and Fátima would be "exceptional", with rulings overall still "rare". According to Slovenian theologians Tadej Strehovec and Mateja Pevec Rozman, the call for extensive investigation is a doctrinal continuance of the latter two cases. They also assert the 2024 norms emphasize openness and caution in "discernment" and they that diocesan bishop participation reaffirms the Catholic hierarchy, all to "foster unity".

Religious historian Tine Van Osselaer similarly identifies the new norms as putting an emphasis on pastoral integrity over verification.
