= Norms regarding the manner of proceeding in the discernment of presumed apparitions or revelations =

1978 Vatican statement on private revelations

Norms regarding the manner of proceeding in the discernment of presumed apparitions or revelations is a 1978 document written by the Holy See's Sacred Congregation for the Doctrine of the Faith (CDF) which sets guidelines for Catholic bishops in discerning claims of private revelation such as Marian apparitions. It specifies the manner of discernment and the authorities competent to carry out such discernment.

The document was abrogated and replaced by Norms for Proceeding in the Discernment of Alleged Supernatural Phenomena in May 2024.

== History ==
According to Angelo Amato, in November 1974 the Sacred Congregation for the Doctrine of the Faith met for its annual plenary congregation. Amato adds that the Holy See decided that the text was an "in-house" document intended for bishops, and as such did not need to be published. The Norms document was given to bishops "sub secreto" (secretly) and not published in the Holy See's official journal Acta Apostolicae Sedis.

However, excerpts from the text and translations of it appeared in print from 1997 to 2008.

In 2012, the Congregation for the Doctrine of the Faith released the text to the public in Latin and five vernacular translations with a new preface by Cardinal William Levada, prefect of CDF.

== Summary ==
=== Chapter 1: Criteria ===
The document specifies multiple criteria, both positive and negative, which ecclesial authorities must take into account when making an evaluation of a purported apparition or other private revelation. Positive criteria include reasonable certainty of the factual occurrence of the revelation, positive qualities of the seer (mental balance, honesty, sincerity, moral rectitude, obedience to Church authority, ability to practice the Faith in a normal way apart from the extraordinary phenomena, etc.), accurate theological content of the messages, and the promotion of positive spiritual fruit in people's lives (spirit of prayer, conversion, works of charity that result, etc.).

Negative criteria that serve as "red flags" in the evaluation of an apparition or revelation include inability to establish factual certainty, theological errors in the messages, evidence of the pursuit of financial gain in connection with the alleged revelations, and psychological disorders or grave immorality on the part of the seers or others closely associated with the events.

=== Chapter 2: Intervention ===
The document says that intervention should occur promptly if an alleged supernatural event begins to gather a following. It draws a distinction between private revelation and the devotion that surrounds it, saying that ecclesial authority may authorize the devotion without authorizing the alleged revelation itself. Competent authority should swiftly intervene in the case of clear doctrinal error or other dangers to the faithful, but should exercise reservation in case of doubt.

=== Chapter 3: Competent Authority ===
Primary responsibility falls to the local Ordinary (i.e. the bishop of the place in which the alleged event occurs). If the Ordinary requests it, the area's episcopal conference can intervene. The Holy See can intervene at any time, whether or not it is asked.

=== Chapter 4: Intervention by the CDF ===
When the CDF of the Holy See does intervene—either when asked or of its own accord—it will either choose to assist the existing investigation or take over with its own separate investigation.

== Abrogation ==
On 17 May 2024, the Dicastery for the Doctrine of the Faith published Norms for Proceeding in the Discernment of Alleged Supernatural Phenomena. those are new guidelines, signed by Pope Francis, which abrogated and replaced the 1978 Norms. It sets new norms and guidelines for Catholic bishops in discerning claims of private revelation. These new guidelines entered into force on 19 May 2024.

== See also ==
- Marian apparition
