= Acquate =

Coordinates: 45°51′38″N 24°37′01″E

- Former commune annexed by Lecco in 1923
- Interactive map of Acquate
- Country: Italy
- Region: Lombardy
- Province: Lecco
- Comune: Lecco
- Time zone: UTC+1 (CET)
  - Summer (DST): UTC+2 (CEST)

Acquate (in Lecchese dialect Quàa) is a ward of Lecco, Italy, located north-east of the city centre. It is situated at the foot of the hill between the Bione and Caldone creeks.

== History ==
The village of Acquate, consisting of an urban center and its church, is attested still in 1232 and was part of Lecco within the Duchy of Milan.

In Napoleonic era, in 1809, Acquate became a frazione of Lecco, taking again its autonomy with the constitution of the Kingdom of Lombardy–Venetia in 1815.

At the proclamation of the Kingdom of Italy in 1861, Acquate had 1,481 inhabitants, and 2,421 in 1921. It was downgraded and attached to Lecco in 1923.

In Acquate is born sister Maria Ripamonti.

== Places of interest ==
Many scenes of The Betrothed by Alessandro Manzoni are held in Acquate. The ward is considered to be the hometown of Renzo and Lucia, and there are still some buildings mentioned by Manzoni, such as the traditional house of Lucia (the presumed house is located in the Olate district).

== Feast ==
The Scigalott d'or (a Lecco dialect term meaning "golden cicada" in Italian) is the biannual fair of the district; it takes place in September the odd years and consists of organizing lot of activities and competitions between the six different districts that make up the ward.
