= Rosa Mystica =

Poetic title of the Virgin Mary

Rosa Mystica Mystical Rose – Mother of the Church
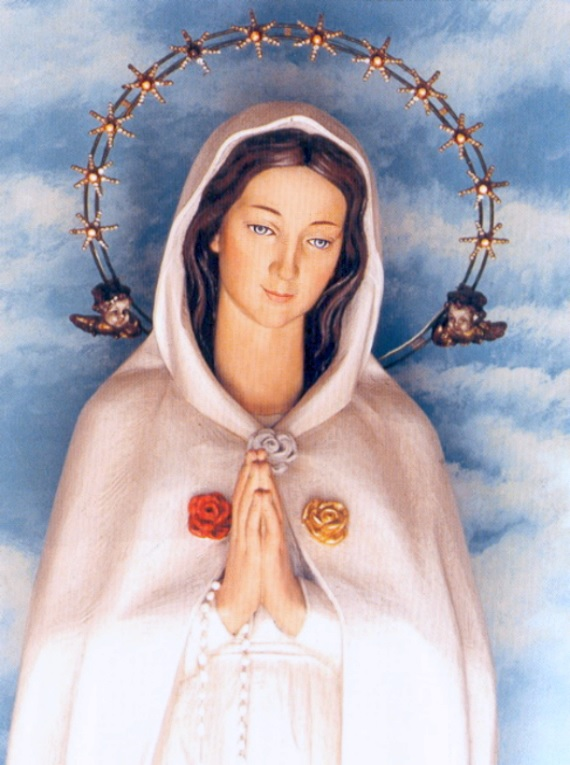
- The statue of Virgin Mary under the title of Mystical Rose enshrined within the chapel of Montichiari-Fontanelle (Italy) apparitions
- Location: Montichiari and Fontanelle, Italy
- Date: 1947–1966
- Witness: Pierina Gilli
- Type: Marian apparition
- Shrine: Sanctuary of Mystical Rose – Mother of the Church
- Attributes: The Blessed Virgin Mary featuring three swords, or three roses in red, white and yellow.
- Feast day: July 13 (feast day); December 8 (at noon, the so-called "Hour of Universal Grace")

Rosa Mystica (or Mystical Rose) is a poetic title of Mary. One form of Marian devotion is invoking Virgin Mary's prayers by calling upon her using a litany of diverse titles, and the title 'Mystical Rose' is found in the Litany of Loreto. It is also a Catholic title of Our Lady based on the Marian apparitions reported between 1947 and 1966 by Pierina Gilli at Montichiari and Fontanelle, in Italy.

== Origins ==
The Biblical source of the title is Song of Songs 2:1, often translated, "I am the Rose of Sharon". Bishop Robert C. Morlino draws a connection to Isaiah 11:1, "But a shoot shall sprout from the stump of Jesse, and from his roots a bud shall blossom. This is also reflected in the German Advent hymn Es ist ein Ros entsprungen, known in English as ""Lo, how a rose e'er blooming", which makes reference to the Old Testament prophecies of Isaiah which in Christian interpretation foretell the Incarnation of Christ, and to the Tree of Jesse, a traditional symbol of the lineage of Jesus.

== Examples in Art and Literature ==
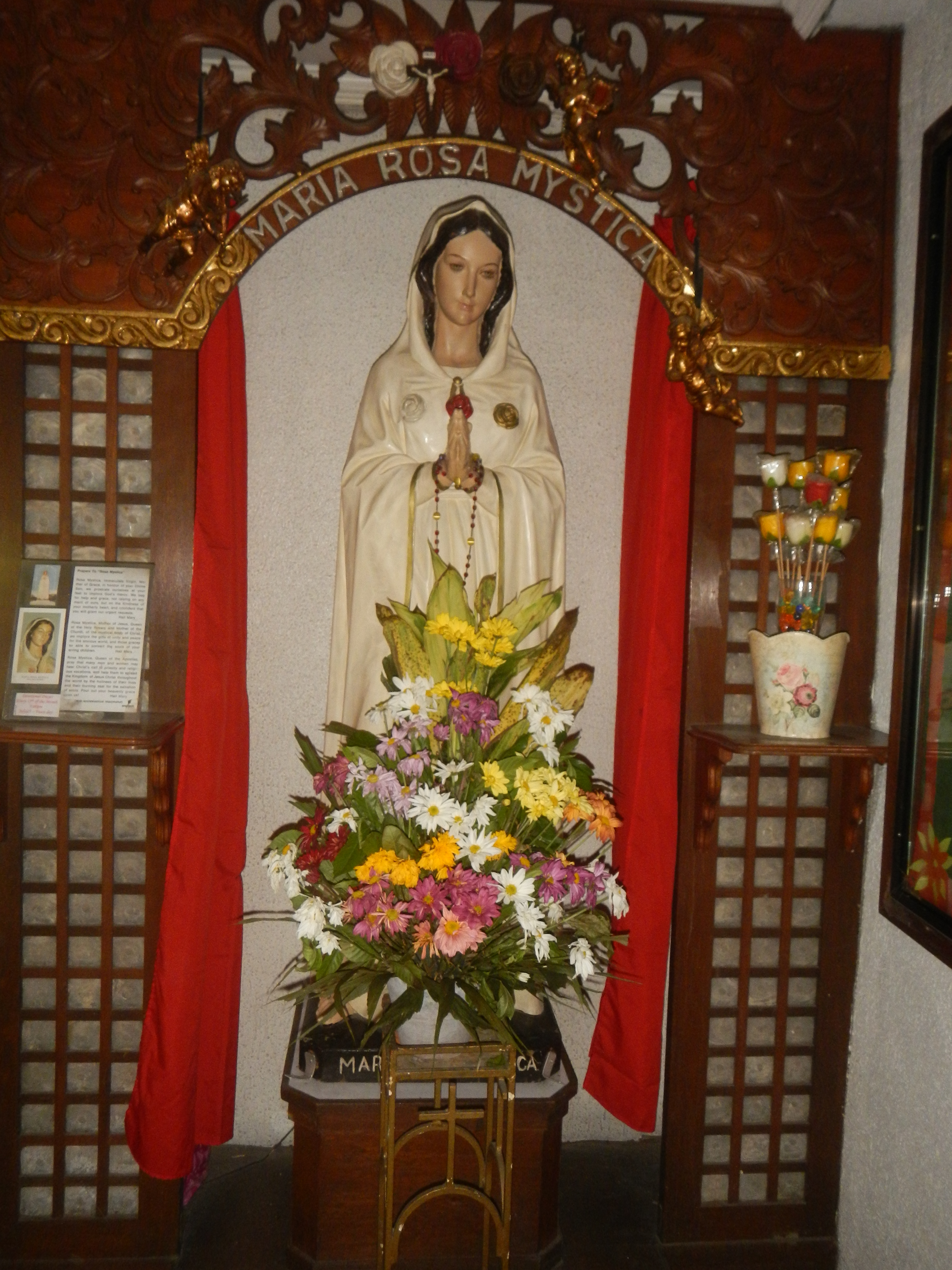
A devotional statue of Virgin Mary under the title of Rosa Mystica

A devotional image enshrined at the Maria Rosenberg Church in Waldfischbach-Burgalben, Germany, holds an 1138 painting of Mary, featuring roses.

John Henry Newman said,

Mary is the most beautiful flower ever seen in the spiritual world. It is by the power of God’s grace that from this barren and desolate earth there ever sprung up at all flowers of holiness and glory; and Mary is the Queen of them all. She is the Queen of spiritual flowers; and therefore, is called the Rose, for the rose is called of all flowers the most beautiful. But, moreover, she is the Mystical or Hidden Rose, for mystical means hidden.

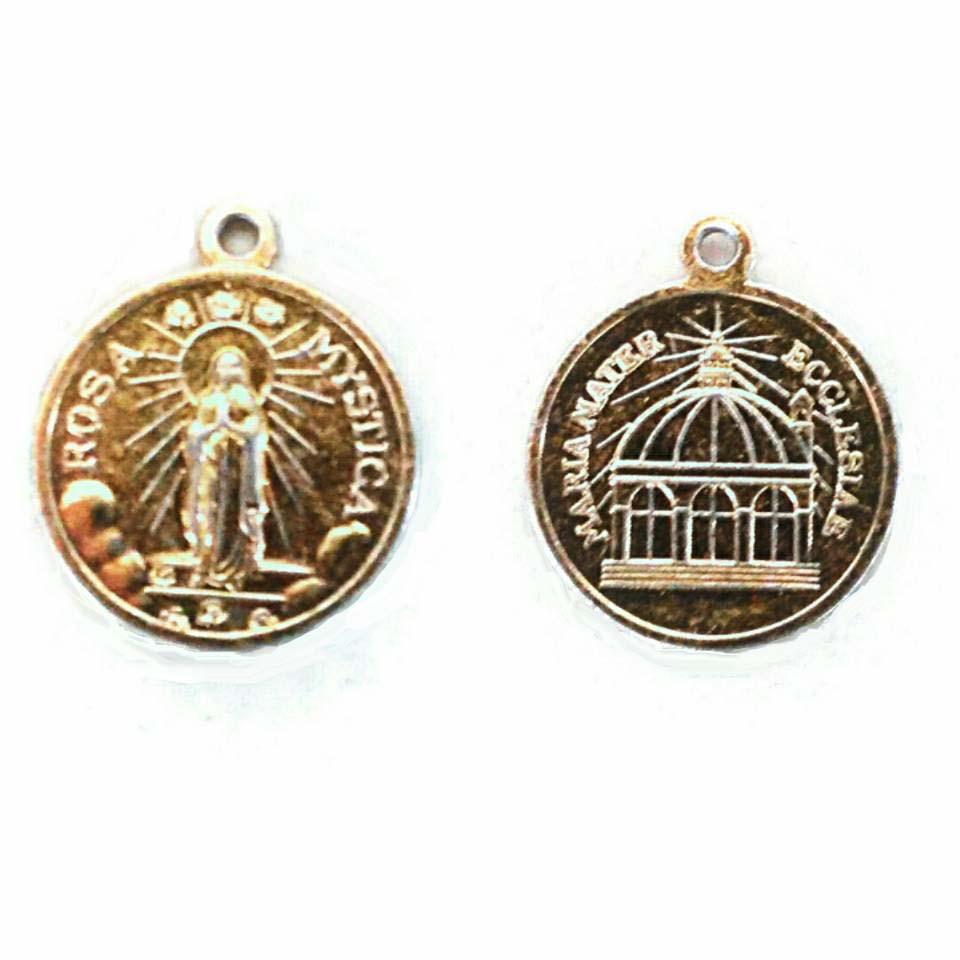
The devotional medal of Maria Rosa Mystica – Mater Ecclesiae

Roses have long been connected with Mary, the red rose symbolic of love, the white rose, of purity. In the fifth century, Coelius Sedulius referred to Mary as a "rose among thorns". Known as the “queen of flowers”, the rose represents Mary as Queen of Heaven. Medieval writers also referenced a passage from Sirach 24:14 "like a palm tree in Engedi, like a rosebush in Jericho". Bernard of Clairvaux said, "Eve was a thorn, wounding, bringing death to all; in Mary we see a rose, soothing everybody's hurts, giving the destiny of salvation back to all." Mary is celebrated under the title "Our Lady of the Rose in Lucca, Italy on January 30. Roses feature prominently in the apparition of Our Lady of Guadalupe.

Gerard Manley Hopkins wrote a devotional poem called "Rosa Mystica" (c.1874-5), which includes the lines "Mary the Virgin, well the heart knows, / She is the mystery, she is that rose". George Egerton's novel Rosa Amorosa (1901) repeats the litany "Rosa mystica! Ora pro nobis!" but subsequently subverts this by transforming it into a pantheistic call "The elm overhead is my Rosa mystica!". Chrysogonus Waddell composed an a capella choral piece titled "Rosa Mystica", which was featured in the 2017 film Lady Bird.

== Modern Italian Devotion ==
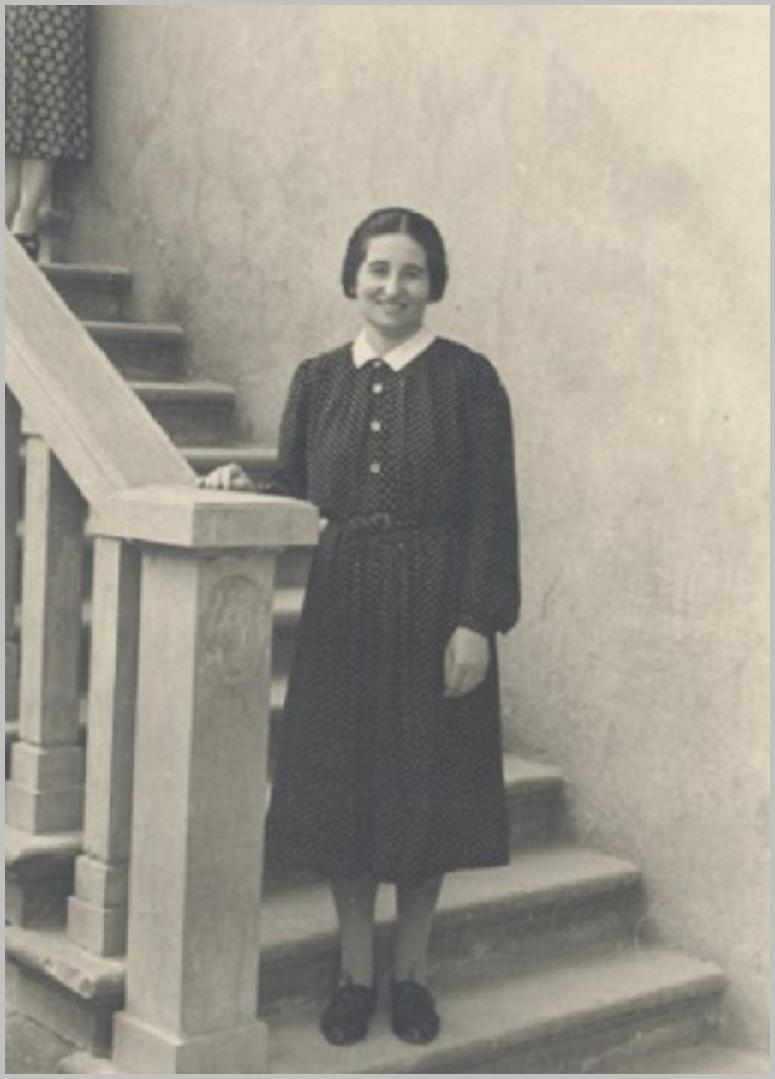
The Virgin Mary's Italian visionary Pierina Gilli.

On 7 December 2019, the Roman Catholic Diocese of Brescia inaugurated a shrine to the Blessed Virgin under the title Rosa Mystica – Mother of the Church. The sanctuary is a response to the claims of Pierina Gilli who reported Marian apparitions in Montichiari and neighbouring Fontanelle, Italy, in 1947 and 1966. Whether or not the source was a genuine apparition of the Virgin Mary, Pierina actively promoted a devotion to Our Lady with three roses upon her breast and a way of practicing devotion to Mary under the title "Rosa Mystica".

== Devotion and claims of Miracles in Venezuela ==
María, Rosa Mystica, arrived in Venezuela as the Pilgrim Virgin, traveling through homes in the arms of devoted followers.

In today's day and age various temples and some devout households in Venezuela celebrate the Virgin Rosa Mystica on the 13th of each month. These celebrations include the exposition of the Blessed Sacrament, the praying of the rosary, and the Holy Mass, in accordance with the Virgin's requests to Pierina during her apparitions. "Wherever my image goes, my presence is there." This sentiment is echoed by those who have hosted her image in their homes, reporting a palpable sense of her presence at every domestic altar.

The main feast day for the Virgin Rosa Mystica is on July 13. On October 13, the Reparative Communion is distributed during the celebrations. Additionally, on December 8 at 12:00 p.m., the "Hour of Grace" is observed. These events are organized by groups of priests, nuns, and committed laypeople who uphold this devotion in Venezuela.

== See also ==
- Marian apparition
- Pierina Gilli
