= Maria Crocifissa di Rosa =

Italian Roman Catholic saint (1813–1855)

Saint Maria Crocifissa Di Rosa
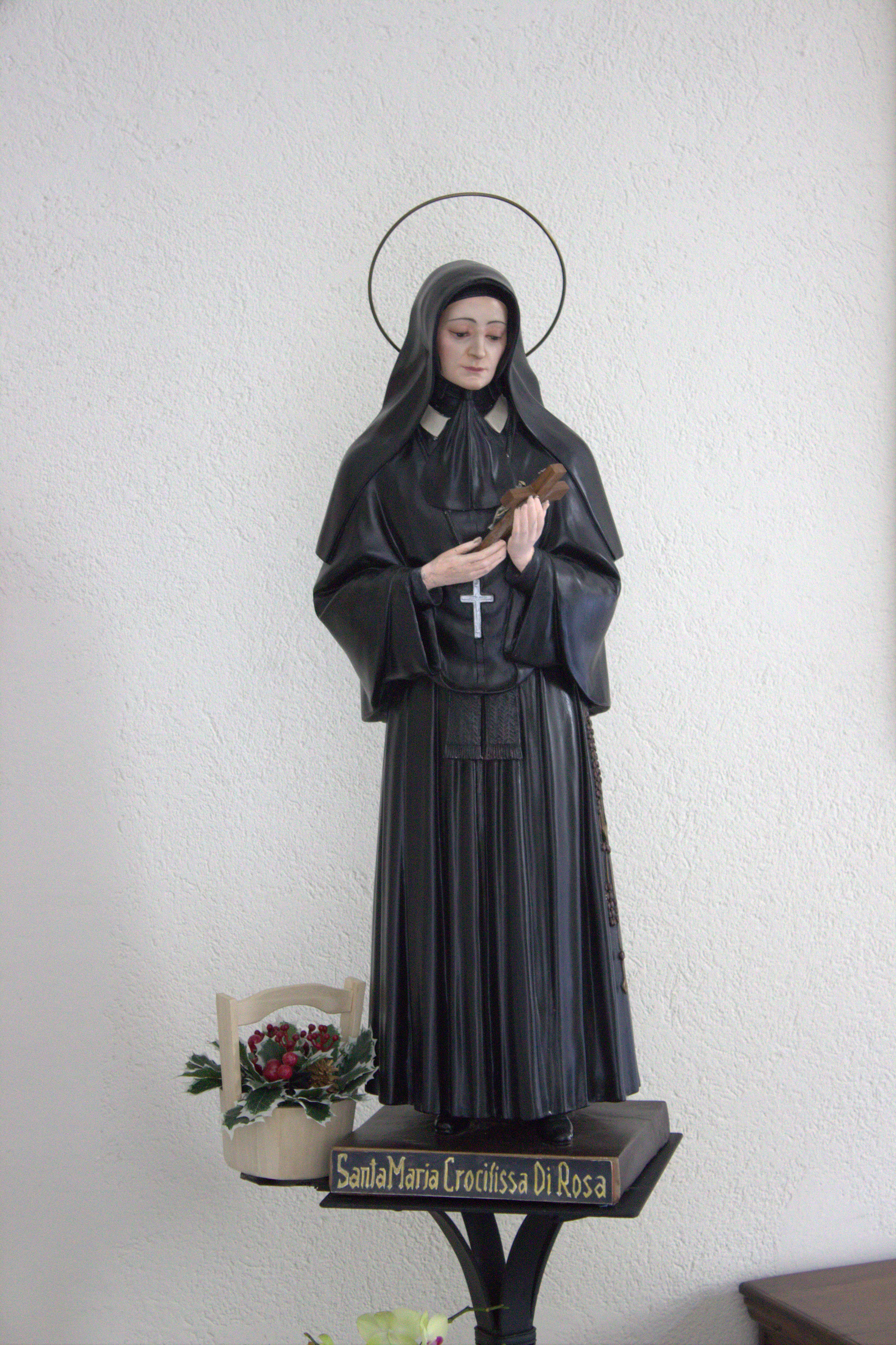
- Statue of the saint in Bagolino, 2014

Religious
- Born: 6 November 1813; Brescia, Napoleonic Kingdom
- Died: 15 December 1855 (aged 42); Brescia, Kingdom of Lombardy–Venetia
- Venerated in: Roman Catholic Church
- Beatified: 26 May 1940, Saint Peter's Basilica, Vatican City by Pope Pius XII
- Canonized: 12 June 1954, Saint Peter's Basilica, Vatican City by Pope Pius XII
- Feast: 15 December
- Attributes: Religious habit
- Patronage: Ancelle della carità

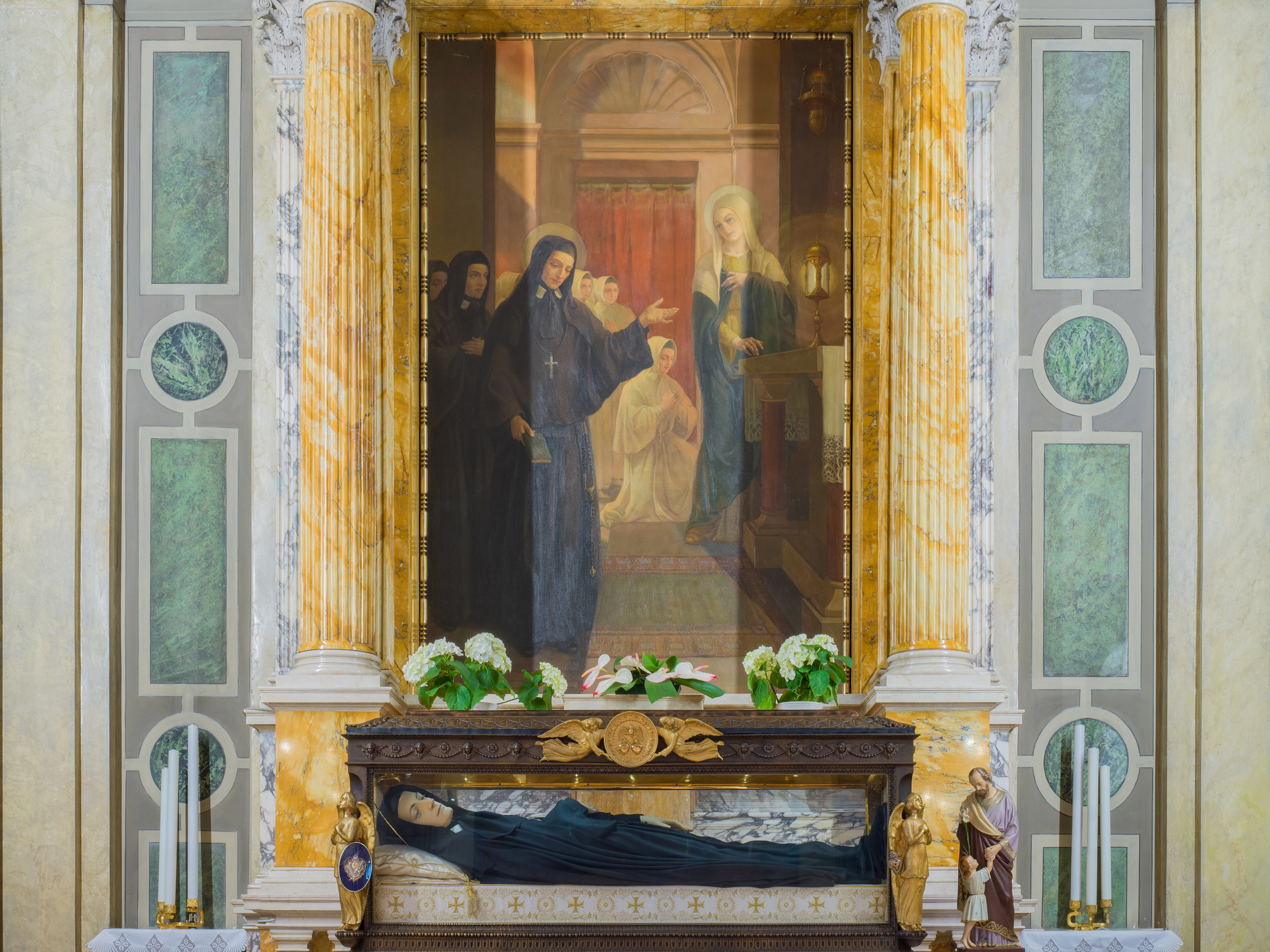
Altar and funeral monument of Maria Crocifissa di Rosa in the Handmaids of Charity chapel in Brescia

Maria Crocifissa Di Rosa (6 November 1813 – 15 December 1855) - born as Paola Francesca Di Rosa - was an Italian Roman Catholic professed religious and the founder of the Ancelle della carità (1839). Di Rosa worked first at her father's spinning mill where she - with his encouragement - tended to the spiritual and material needs of the female workers while gathering several women to dedicate their collective efforts to caring for the poor; this formed the basis for the establishment of her religious congregation. Her apostolate prioritized tending to the ill in hospitals and to soldiers going to the front.

Her beatification was celebrated in mid-1940 and Pope Pius XII (who beatified her) canonized her over a decade later on 12 June 1954.

== Life ==
Paola Francesca Di Rosa was born on 6 November 1813 in Brescia as one of nine children born to the rich industrialist Clemente Di Rosa and Countess Camilla Albani (from the noble Albani line).

Di Rosa was educated by the Visitation Sisters in their convent in Brescia; she left school after her mother died in 1824. She began working in her father's large spinning mill in Acquafredda where she took an instant notice of the working conditions; she became the manager when she turned nineteen. She began caring for the female workers and devoted herself to looking after their material and spiritual needs which was something that her father encouraged her to do. Her father began searching for suitors to have her married, but she turned each of them down. Di Rosa was upset that her father did this and confessed her disappointment to the priest Faustino Pinzoni who then spoke to her father to tell him that his daughter had another vocation in mind. Di Rosa lived at home for the next decade, increasing her involvement in various forms of social work.

Brescia suffered from a cholera epidemic in 1836 and Di Rosa went to tend to ill in the local hospital. It was also around this stage that she directed a home for mute and deaf women and in 1840 began gathering a small group of women that would later evolve into her future religious congregation (first entitled a Pious Union). Her order became known as the Ancelle della carità and she later took her religious name and was vested in the habit after undergoing her formation and making her profession in 1852. Di Rosa directed her order to caring for the poor as well the sick since those were the main focus of her religious apostolate; she once said to her colleagues that "I suffer from seeing suffering". Her order received papal approval from Pope Pius IX in 1850 after having received diocesan approval from the Bishop of Brescia Carlo Domenico Ferrari in 1843.

Di Rosa died at a hospital in Brescia on 15 December 1855 after suffering from a prolonged illness.

== Sainthood ==
The canonization process commenced under Pope Pius X on 10 December 1913 and she became titled as a Servant of God. The confirmation of her life of heroic virtue allowed for Pope Pius XI to declare her Venerable on 10 July 1932 while the papal confirmation of two miracles attributed to her on 25 February 1940 enabled Pope Pius XII to preside over her beatification on 26 May 1940.

The cause for her canonization was opened on 7 January 1951. Pius XII confirmed two additional miracles attributed to Di Rosa on 17 January 1954 and canonized her as a saint in Saint Peter's Basilica on 12 June 1954.

== Other sources ==
- LE ANCELLE DELLA CARITÀ DI BRESCIA: Per la Beatificazione della loro Madre Fondatrice Maria Crocifissa di-Rosa nel I° Centenario della Congregazione 1840–1940.
- FOSSATI, LUIGI: Beata Maria Crocifissa Di-Rosa [Di Rosa] - Fondatrice delle Ancelle della Carità in Brescia 1940.
