= Handmaids of Charity =

Handmaids of Charity chapel in Brescia.

The Handmaids of Charity (Italian: Ancelle della Carità; Latin: Congregatio Ancillarum a Charitate; abbreviation: A.D.C.) is a religious institute of pontifical right whose members profess public vows of chastity, poverty, and obedience and follow the evangelical way of life in common.

== History ==
This religious institute was founded in Brescia, Italy, in 1840, by Maria Crocifissa di Rosa.

As of 31 December 2005 there were 1103 sisters in 102 communities in Italy, Croatia, Rwanda, Brazil, and Ecuador.

Their mission includes care of the sick, lepers and elderly. The Generalate of the Congregation can be found in Brescia, Italy.
